= Ricaurte family =

- Aristocracy, political family
- Country: Colombia
- Earlier spellings: Ricart in Euskera
- Etymology: Between rivers
- Origin: Bar-Kugi (near San Pedro de Garragoechea), Vizcaya, Basque Country, Spain
- Founder: Pedro Ricaurte
- Connected families: Álvarez family Caicedo family Nariño Family; Urdaneta family París family Marroquín family Lozano de Peralta family Olaya family Sanz de Santamaría family Gordillo family

The Ricaurtes are an aristocratic family from Colombia, who played an important role in the country during the 18th and 19th centuries, especially during the Spanish American wars of independence. Its origin is in Vizcaya, Spain.

Its members include important military and political figures, and a significant number of women whose husbands were of historical importance in Colombia, including several presidents of the country.

== History ==
Origin

Of the executive orders of Ricaurte, Terreros, Villareal and Landaverde, given in Madrid on April 4, 1719, by Juan Antonio de Hozes Sarmiento, Chronicler and King of Arms of Felipe V, at the request and for the use of Antonio José de Ricaurte and Terreros, Senior Accountant of the Court of Accounts of the city of Santafé, in the New Kingdom of Granada, the origin of the surname Ricaurte stands out:

Among the most ancient palaces that foreshadow loyal and noble lordship of Vizcaya, stands the primitive one of the Ricaurte lineage, which had its foundation below San Pedro de Carraigochea, in an eminent site that those ancients knew by name. Barkuji, the house was founded in the years 603; Oger or Oker, one of the noble Romans who inhabited these lands had Oquendo as his son, and he was the father of Mauso, a knight, who had three sons, whom they called Los Rodajes, which was the same that they were invincible, due to the great forces they achieved, so that they were the terror of everything contrary.

The eldest of the mentioned men was called by his own name Ricaurte (Rocarte, according to some writings). From this man descended Don Álvaro Ricaurte, one who fought in the Battle of Clavijo.

=== Surname Ricaurte ===
The surname comes from the Vizcaya region, in the Basque Country, Spain. More exactly, it finds its roots in the town of Bar-Kugi, near San Pedro de Garragoechea. For this reason, the original members of the family spoke Basque, and, in fact, the word Ricaurte comes from the Basque word Ricart, which literally means Between Rivers.

== Genealogy ==
The first known member of the family was the Basque soldier Alvar Ricaurte, who is said to have participated in the mythical Battle of Clavijo in 844, led by the Asturian king Ramiro I. Another Basque ancestor of the family was Fermín Ricaurte, counselor of Infanta Urraca, daughter of King Alfonso VI of Castile. One of his sons was the Castilian nobleman Pedro Ricaurte, founder of the Colombian branch. Pedro Ricaurte arrived in New Granada and settled in the city of Santafé de Bogotá, the capital of the Viceroyalty of New Granada.

Presidents related to the family

- Jorge Tadeo Lozano (1811–1816) March 24, 1811 September 29, 1811

Brother-in-law and nephew of Antonio Ricaurte

- Antonio Nariño and Alvarez (1765–1823) September 29, 1811 August 31, 1813

Uncle of Trinidad Ricaurte Nariño

- Rafael Urdaneta Faria (1788–1845) September 4, 1830 May 2, 1831

Son-in-law of María Ignacia París Ricaurte

- Joaquin Paris Ricaurte (1795–1868) April 1, 1855 April 1, 1856

Presidential appointee of Manuel María Mallarino

- Jose Manuel Marroquin Ricaurte (1827–1908) July 31, 1900 August 7, 1904
- Enrique Olaya Herrera (1880–1927) August 7, 1930 August 7, 1934

Son of Emeterio Olaya Ricaurte

- Gabriel Paris Gordillo (1910–2008)

Head of the Military Government Junta

Great-great-grandson of José Ignacio París Ricaurte

== Related Links ==
- Arrubla, G., Henao, J. M. (1820). History of Colombia for secondary education. Colombia: Colombian Bookstore, C. Roldán & Tamayo.
- The People and the King The Comunero Revolution in Colombia, 1781 By John Leddy Phelan · 2010

== Toponymy ==
Ricaurte, province in the department of Boyacá;

Ricaurte, municipality in the department of Cundinamarca;

Ricaurte, municipality in the department of Nariño;

Ricaurte, corregimiento in the department of Valle del Cauca;

Ricaurte, station of the TransMilenio mass transit system in Bogotá; takes its name from the homonymous neighborhood.

Ricaurte, municipality in the state of Cojedes, Venezuela;

Ricaurte, Cuenca Canton Parish, Ecuador;

Ricaurte, Parish of Urdaneta Canton, Ecuador;
