= Joaquín Mosquera Figueroa =

Spanish politician (1748–1830)

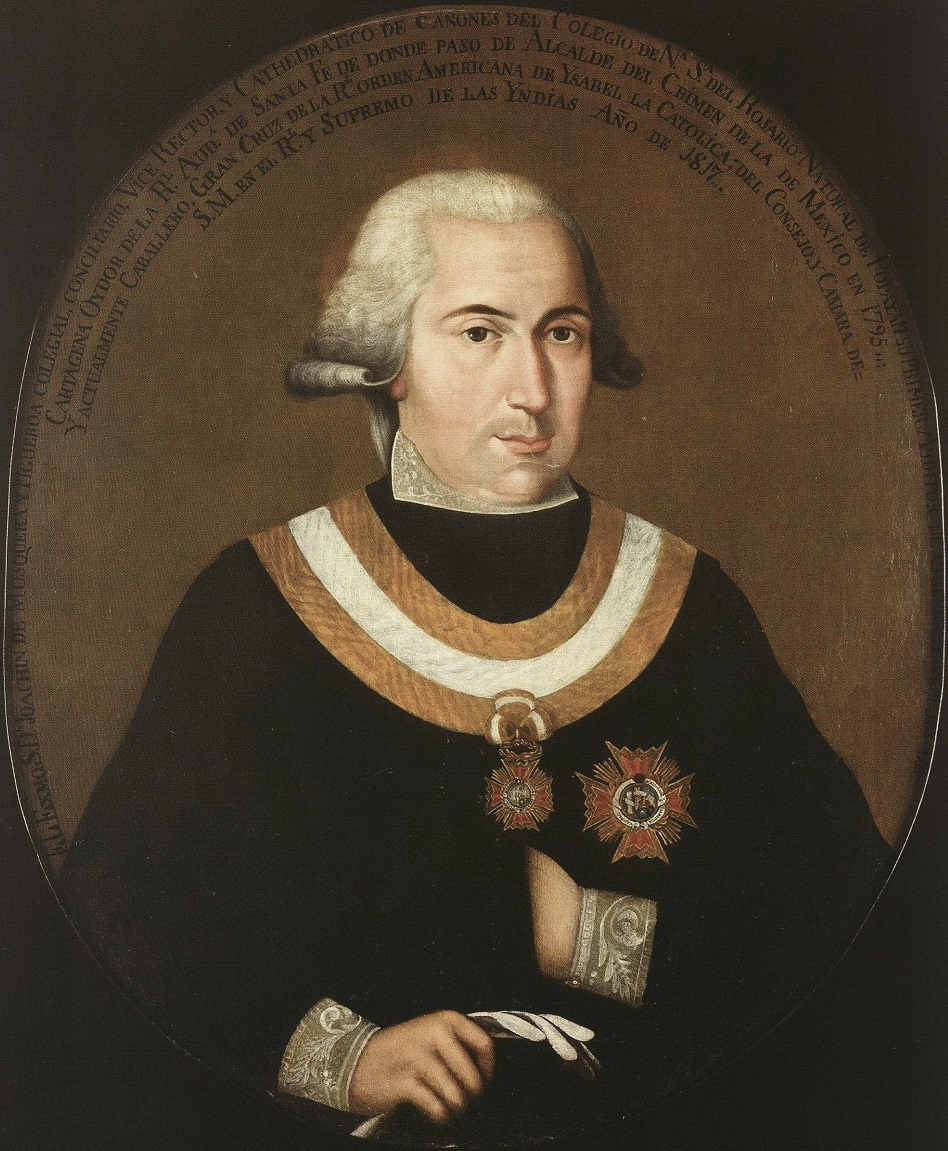
- Portrait of Joaquín de Mosquera y Figueroa

President of the Regency of the Kingdom of Spain
- In office 22 January 1812 – 15 June 1812
- Monarch: Ferdinand VII
- Preceded by: Pedro Agar y Bustillo
- Succeeded by: Duke of the Infantado

Member of the Regency of the Kingdom of Spain
- In office 22 January 1812 – 1813

Minister of the Council of the Indies
- Incumbent
- Assumed office 1814

Personal details
- Born: Joaquín de Mosquera Figueroa y Arboleda Vergara; 19 January 1748 Popayán, Viceroyalty of New Granada, Spanish Empire
- Died: 29 May 1830 (aged 82) Madrid, Kingdom of Spain
- Spouse: María Josefa García de Toledo
- Relations: Mosquera family Arboleda family Vergara family
- Children: 3
- Parent(s): José Patricio de Mosquera y Prieto de Tobar and María Teresa Arboleda y Vergara
- Education: Colegio Mayor del Rosario
- Occupation: Jurist, magistrate and statesman
- Awards: Grand Cross of the Order of Isabella the Catholic

Joaquín de Mosquera Figueroa y Arboleda Vergara (Popayán, 19 of January 1748- Madrid, 29 May 1830) was a Spanish jurist, royal magistrate and high statesman of the Spanish Monarchy during the 19th century, his career extended across Santafé, Cartagena and Caracas in the Viceroyalty of New Granada and Cádiz. Served as oidor of the Royal Audiencias of Santafé and Mexico, regent-visitor of the Audiencia of Caracas, Minister of the council of the Indies and, during the political crisis caused by the captivity of King Ferndinand VII and the Peninsular War, member and acting president of the Regency of the Kingdom of Spain in 1812.

In that capacity Mosquera occupied one of the highest positions attainable within the Spanish monarchy by an American-born official and participated directly in the constitutional transformation represented by the constitution of Cádiz of 1812. For this reason he has been nicknamed "The Colombian who was President of the Spanish Government" or "The Colombian who was King of Spain".
