= Quinta Vergara =

Park in Viña del Mar, Chile

Coordinates: 33°01′41″S 71°33′13″W

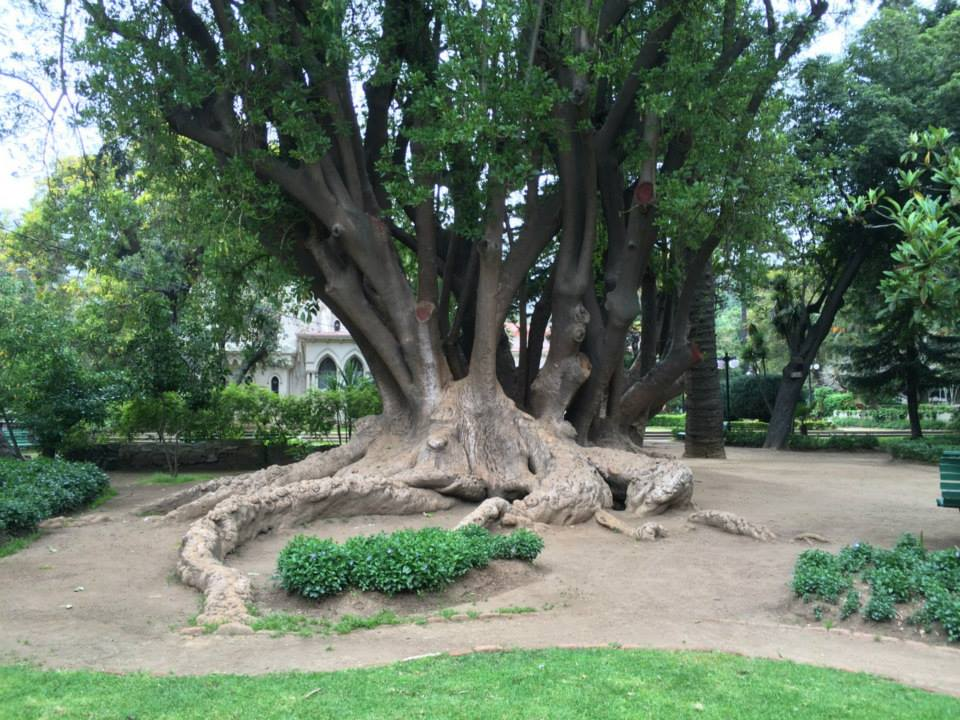
View of the park Quinta Vergara in Viña del Mar, Region V, Chile.

Quinta Vergara is a park located in Viña del Mar, Chile. The park features three major landmarks: the Vergara Palace, the Quinta Vergara Amphitheater and a garden. Every year the park is home to the Viña del Mar International Song Festival.

== Park landmarks ==
=== Palace Vergara ===
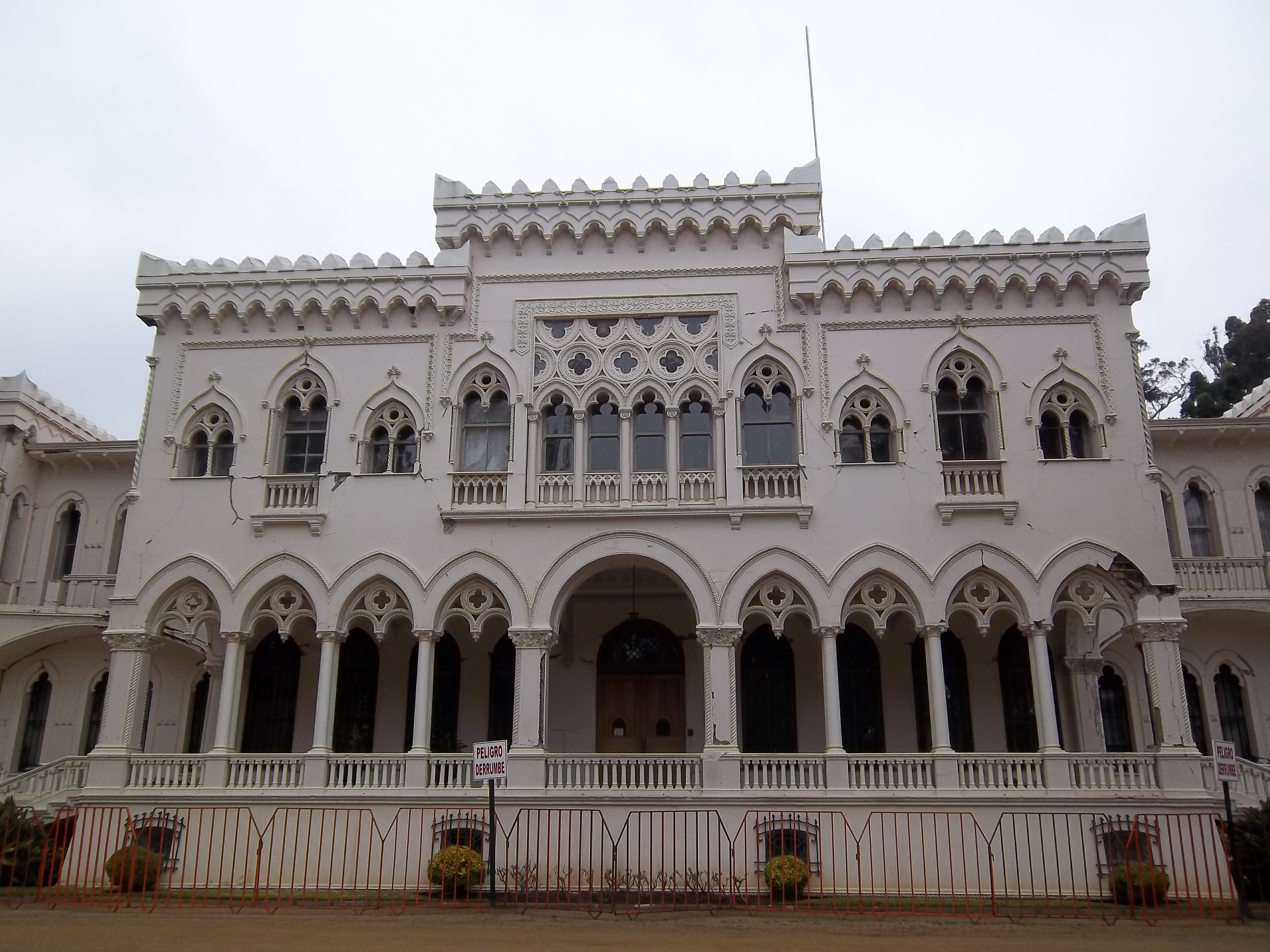
Vergara Palace

The Vergara Palace is the former home of Jose Francisco Vergara, the founder of Viña del Mar. The home was built by the Vergara family in 1910 in a Venetian Gothic style. The home serves as a replacement to the family's former home, which was destroyed in the 1906 Valparaíso earthquake. In 1941 the city bought the building and it was converted into a museum of fine art, which features over 60 works of art. The park around the home features sculptures and statues, including a bust of writer Gabriela Mistral.

=== Quinta Vergara Amphitheater ===
The Quinta Vergara Amphitheater was built after the first Viña del Mar International Song Festival.

=== Artequin Museum of Viña del Mar ===
The Artequin Museum of Viña del Mar opened in 2008. It is an interactive based museum, which features a collection of photographic reproductions of major works from Western art history.

== Gallery ==
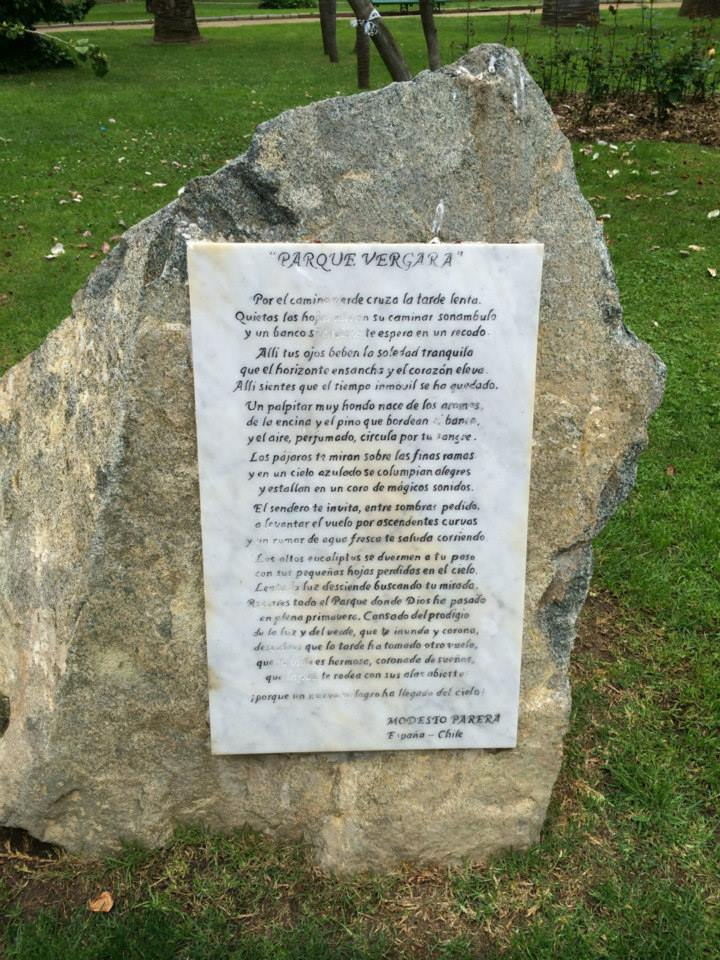
Plaque in Quinta Vergara

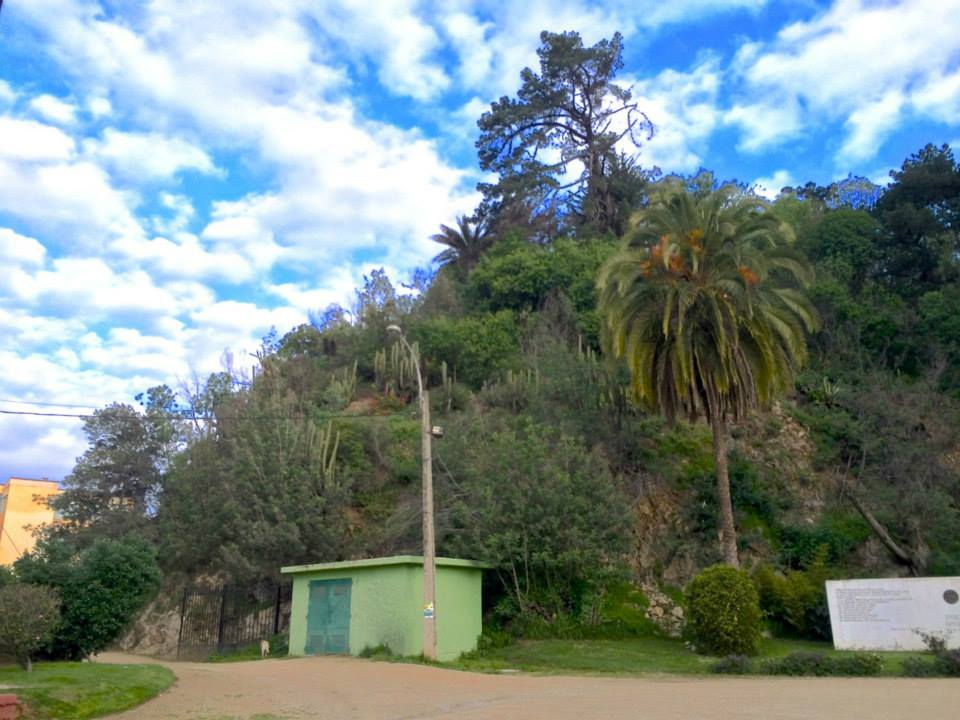
Entrance to the Park

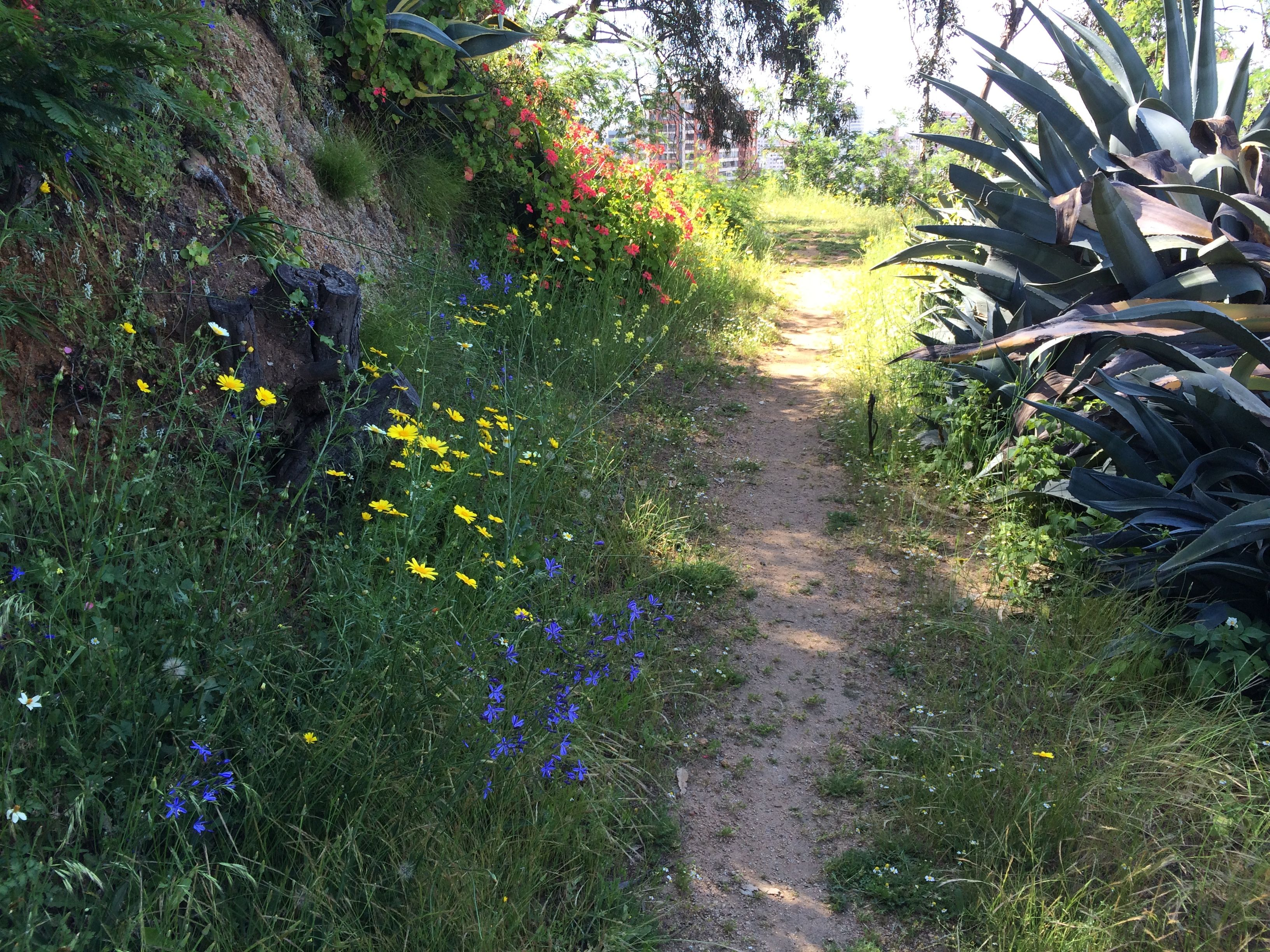
Wildflowers in Quinta Vergara

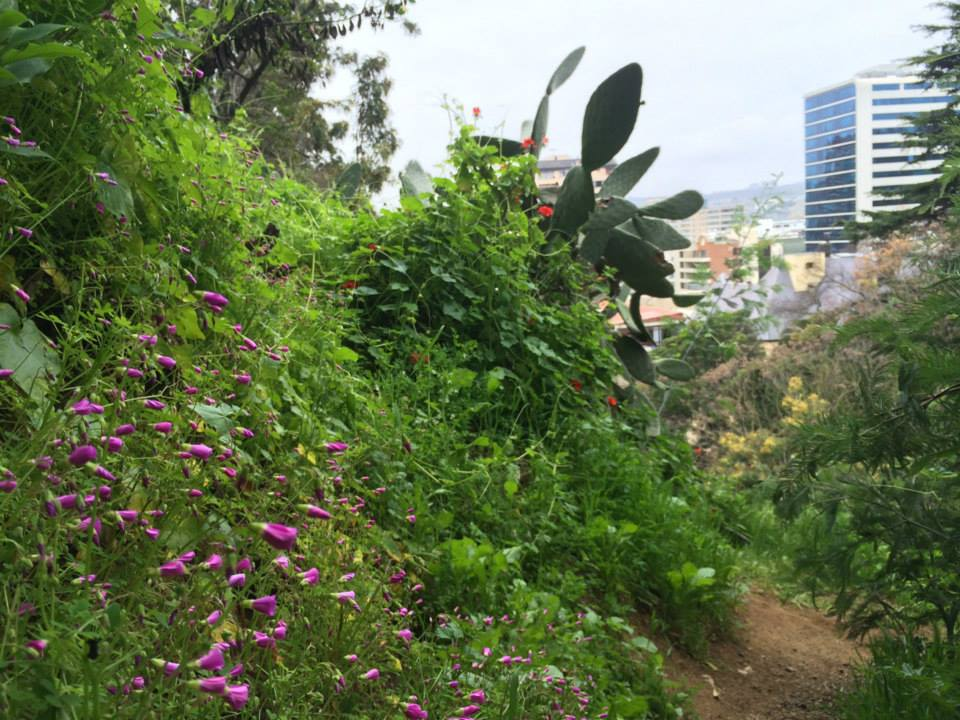
View of Viña del Mar from the Park

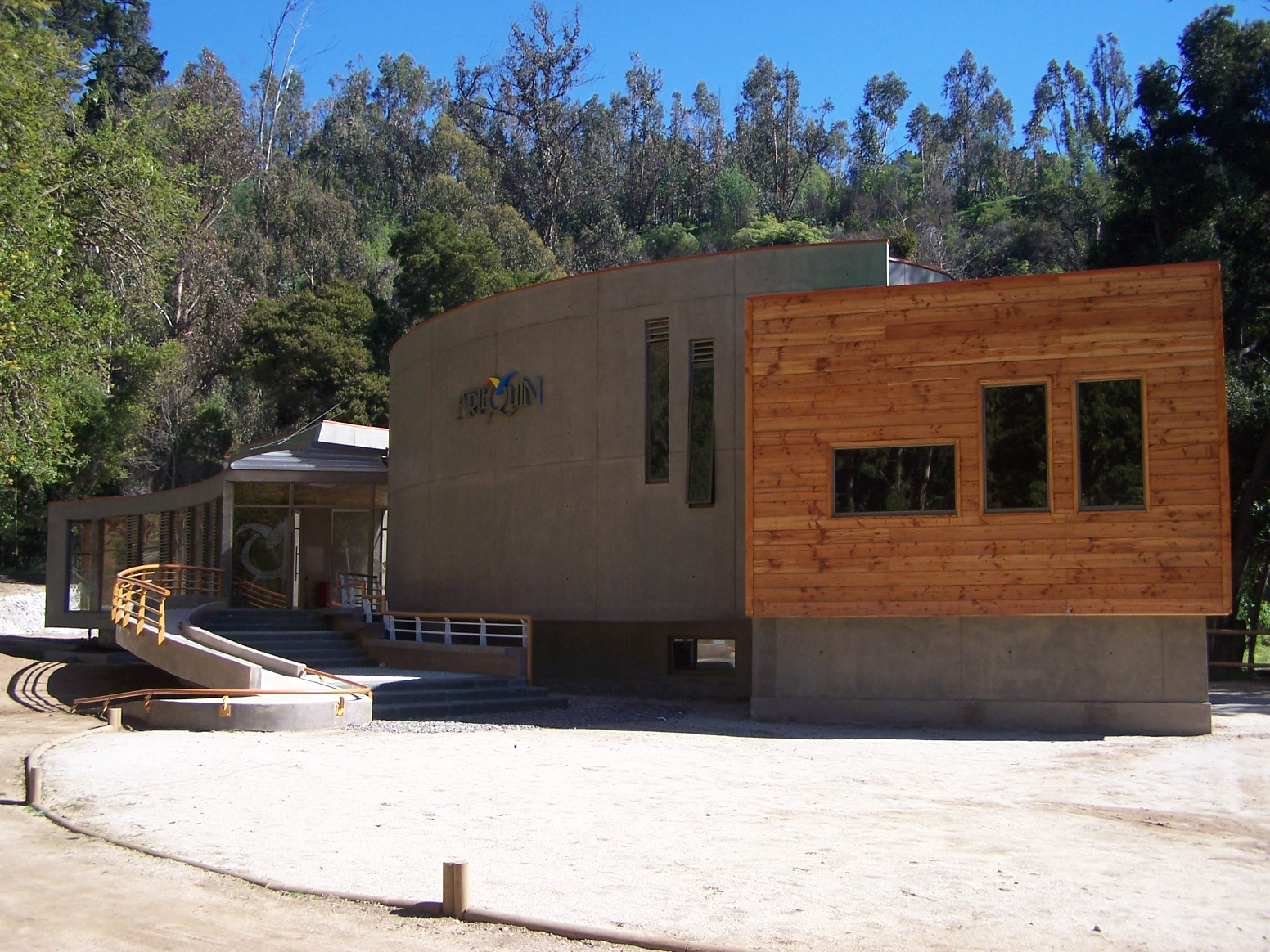
Artequin Museum
