= Caicedo family =

Colombian family

Caycedo
- Aristocracy, political family
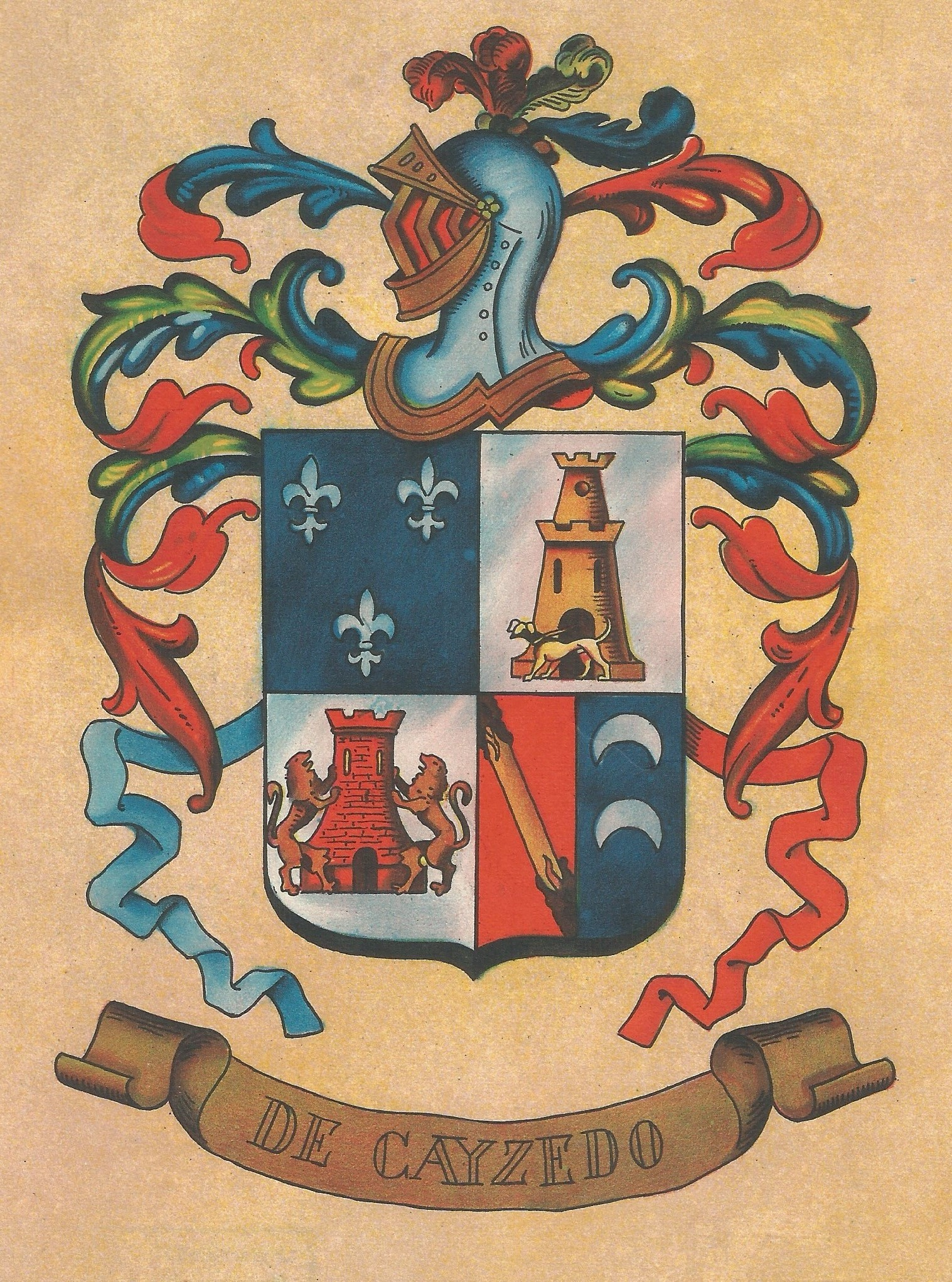
- Coat of arms of the Caycedo family

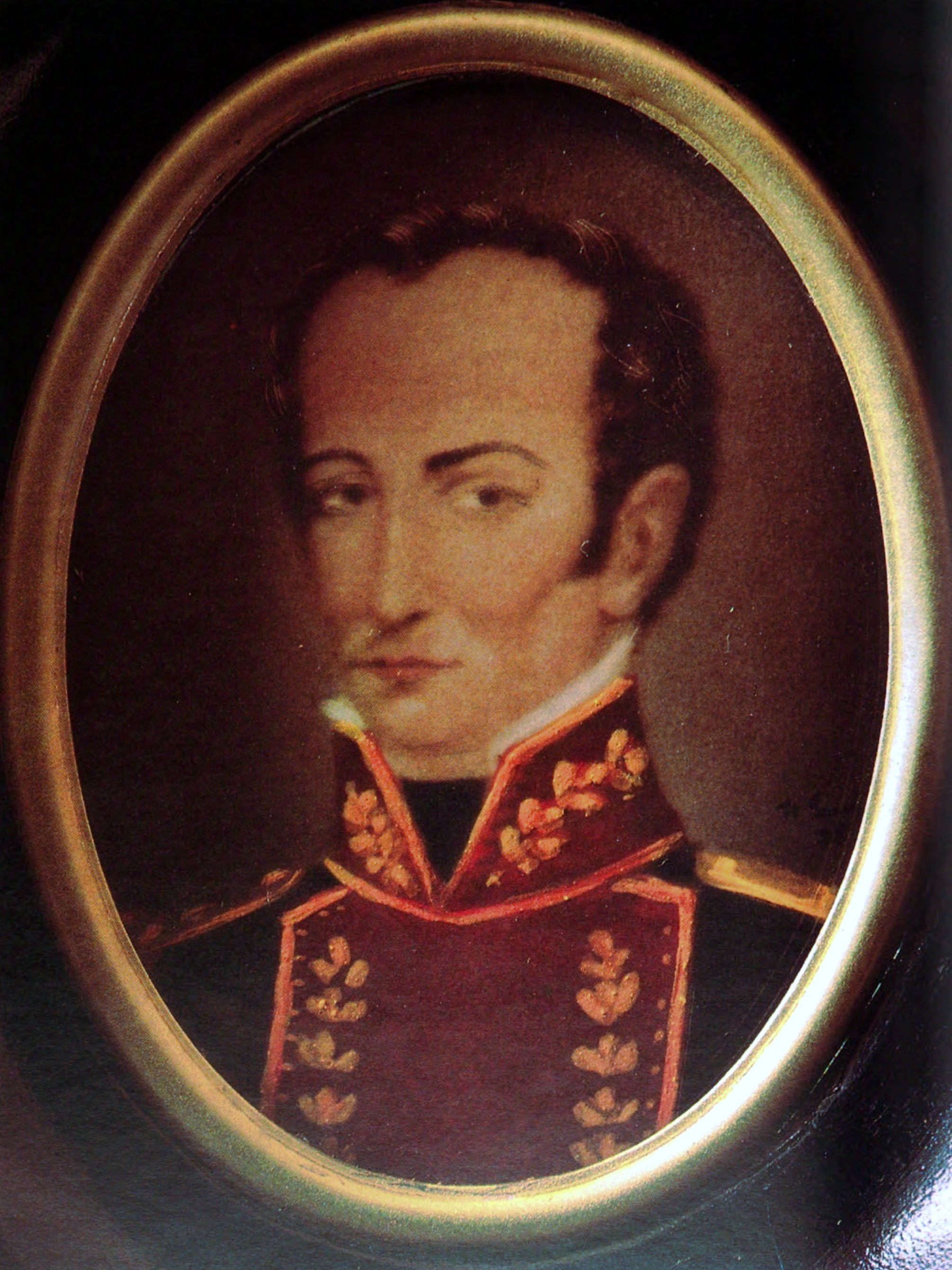
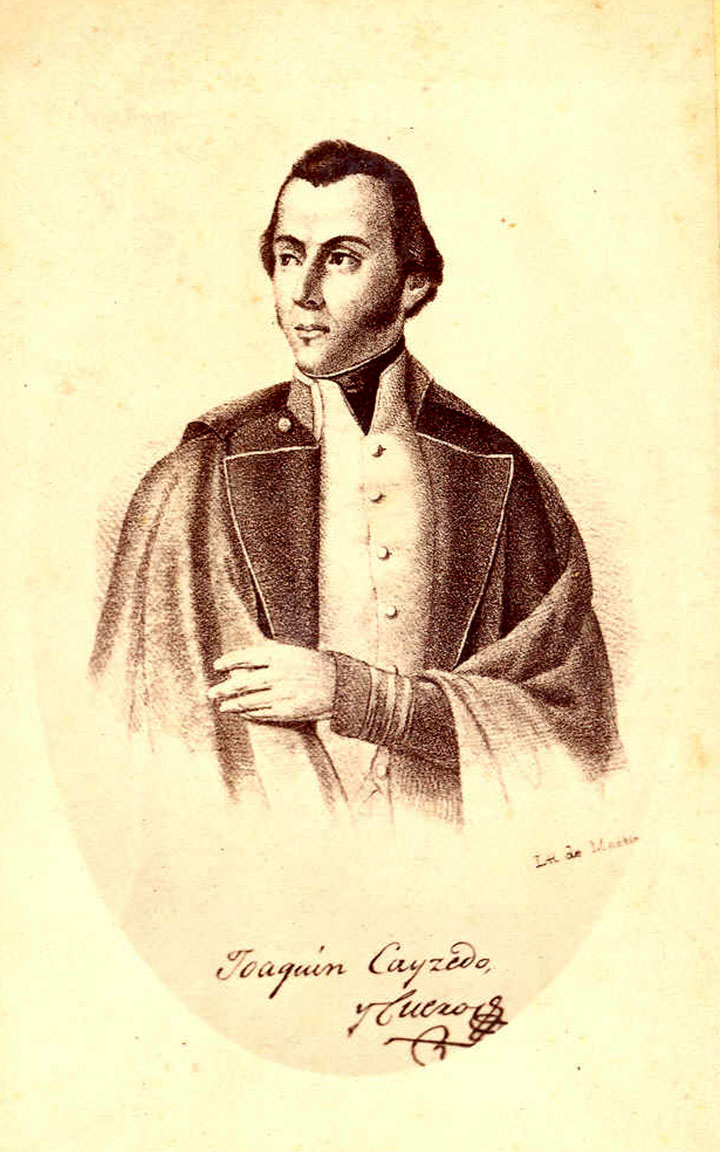
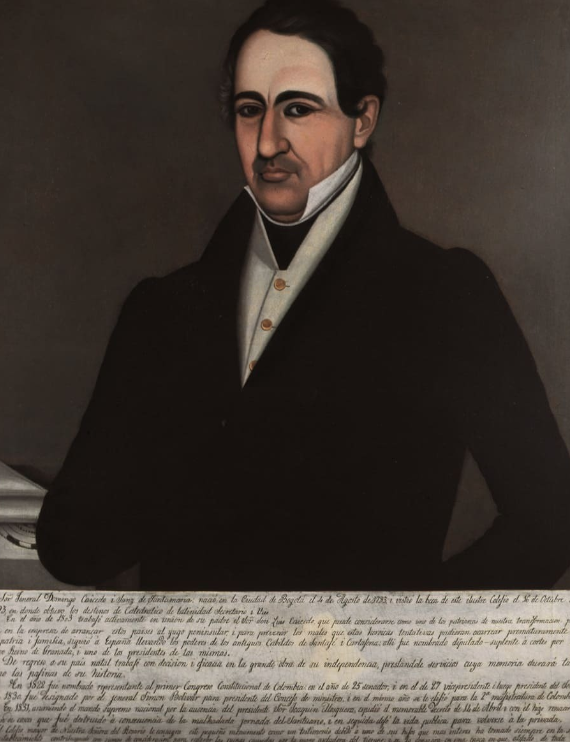
- Luis Caycedo y Flórez Joaquín Cayzedo y Cuero Domingo Caicedo
- Etymology: oak grove
- Founder: Francisco Beltrán de Caycedo y Corcuera(Bogotá); Francisco Torres de Cayzedo (Cali)
- Titles: List: President of Gran Colombia; Vicepresident of Gran Colombia; Vicepresident of New Granada; President of Cundinamarca; President of the Supreme Governing Junta of Cundinamarca; President of the Confederate cities of the Cauca Valley; President of Senate of New Granada; Governor of Bogotá Province; Lieutenant Governor of Cartagena de Indias; Royal Ensign of Santiago de Cali; Mayor of Bogotá; Order of Charles III
- Connected families: Arboleda family Ayerbe family Holguín family Mallarino family Cabal family Mosquera family Pastrana family Borrero family Vergara family
- Traditions: Roman Catholicism
- Estate: Dehesa of Bogotá

The Caicedo or Caycedo are a family of the Colombian aristocracy, The Santafe branch became one of the most important clans in Colombia during the 18th and 19th century, being key to the independence of the colonies from the Spanish Empire.

Among these prestigious members are politicians, Catholic clergy, the military, writers, businessmen, heroes of independence, and two former presidents of the country. There are currently two great branches in Bogotá and Cali, Colombia.

	Domingo Caycedo y Sanz de Santamaría
Felipe de Vergara Azcárate y Caycedo	Felipe de Vergara Azcárate y Caycedo

== Related Links ==
- Caicedo
- Domingo Caicedo
