= Estanislao Vergara =

Colombian politician, 3rd President of Gran Colombia

His Excellency Estanislao Vergara
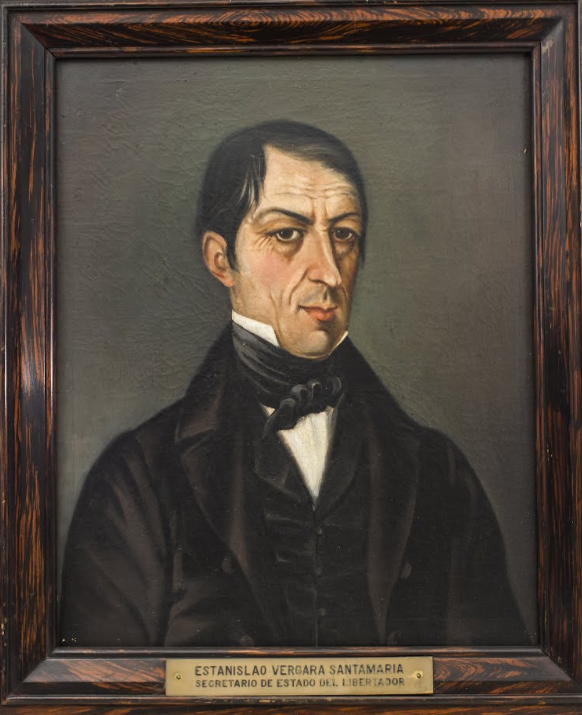

Acting President of the executive power of Gran Colombia
- In office 28 December 1828 – 15 January 1830
- President: Simón Bolívar
- Minister: Foreign Affairs, Internal Affairs, Justice, High Court, State.
- Preceded by: Simon Bolivar
- Succeeded by: Simon Bolivar

Secretary of Foreign Relations of Gran Colombia
- In office 4 March 1828 – 18 January 1830
- President: Simón Bolívar
- Preceded by: José Rafael Revenga
- Succeeded by: Domingo Caycedo

Secretary of the Interior and Justice of Gran Colombia
- In office 5 September 1830 – 15 April 1831
- President: Rafael Urdaneta

Personal details
- Born: Estanislao Vergara y Sanz de Santamaría; March 8, 1790 Santafé de Bogotá, Viceroyalty of New Granada, Spanish Empire
- Died: March 21, 1855 (aged 65) Bogotá, New Granada
- Party: Colombian Conservative Party
- Spouse: Teresa Tenorio Santacruz
- Relations: Vergara family Sanz de Santamaría family
- Children: José María Vergara Tenorio
- Parent(s): Francisco Javier de Vergara y Caycedo and Francisca Sanz de Santamaría y Prieto
- Education: Colegio Mayor del Rosario
- Alma mater: Del Rosario University
- Occupation: Lawyer, jurist, politician, diplomat and professor
- Profession: Law, philosophy
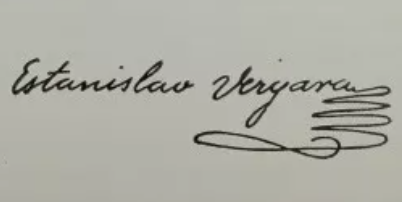
- Signature

Estanislao Vergara y Sanz de Santamaría (March 8, 1790 – March 21, 1855) was a Colombian lawyer, politician, and statesman.

During his career, he served in various positions including Minister of Foreign Affairs, Internal Affairs, Justice, and High Court under three presidents: Simón Bolívar, Francisco de Paula Santander, and Rafael Urdaneta. He even held the presidency of Colombia from December 28, 1828, to January 15, 1830. Acting as Secretary of Foreign Relations of the Council of Ministers that Simón Bolívar left in charge of the executive power, as a result of his dictatorial powers.

Vergara played a significant role in Colombian politics during a crucial transition and is known for his efforts to establish a monarchy in the country. He was instrumental in negotiating with European powers for the appointment of a French monarch in Colombia.

== Early life ==
Vergara belonged to the Vergara family, which originated from Basque country, in the town of Bergara. The family's Colombian lineage began in 1612 with Francisco de Vergara y Azcarate, a Lieutenant Captain General of the Spanish Empire and his son, Antonio de Vergara Azcarate y Dávila, served as a royal treasurer for 50 years until his death, and his descendants continued to serve in the colonial bureaucracy, during the independence era, and into the republic. The Vergara's formed alliances through marriage with other prominent families in Colombia, establishing themselves as one of the oldest and most aristocratic Spanish-American families in South America during the 17th, 18th, and 19th centuries.

He was an active member of the Masonic lodge La Beneficencia and participated in various gatherings in Bogotá. Specifically, he regularly attended the "Tertulia del Buen Taste" created by his aunt Manuela Sanz de Santamaría from a young age. By 1808, he already shared the discontent of the Creoles towards the Spanish government. His family and friends were dissatisfied with the lack of rights given to the Americans. In 1809, he and his acquaintances supported Camilo Torres in publishing the famous Memorial of Grievances. During the July 20, 1810 revolt, also known as El Florero de Llorente, Estanislao was studying jurisprudence at El Rosario. He was optimistic about the republican government and its new regime, which indirectly caused the first signs of the independence process of Colombia. In 1812, Estanislao graduated as a doctor of law and began practicing as a lawyer before the courts of the state of Cundinamarca in 1813.

In 1815, he served as the vice-rector of his alma mater and as an advisor to the Santafé council. On March 1 of the same year, he was appointed by the senate as the Lieutenant-Governor of the Province of Bogotá. Despite trying to resign repeatedly, he was denied permission. Later on, September 2 of the same year, he was appointed as a substitute senator and Legislator to integrate the legislative body. Entering the year 1816, he learned of the taking of Cartagena by Pablo Morillo and the disastrous battle of Charirí that gave a large part of the territory to the Spanish who were in the midst of reconquering New Granada.

In November, President Camilo Torres resigned from his position and Fernandez Madrid took office on March 14 of the following year. Ignacio de Vargas was arrested because he received friendly letters from the royalist general De la Calzada. As a result, Vergara replaced him again as lieutenant governor of Cundinamarca on March 18, 1816. Due to the imminent threat of the royalist troops taking Santafé, Governor Nicolás Ribas resigned on April 24, and Vergara was promoted to that position. During his term, he organized civic guards and cavalry squadrons throughout Bogotá to boost morale before the Spanish took over the city. He also participated in the delivery of provisions and war materials to the cavalry troops. Although he tried to resign again, the Senate did not accept it and expressed their confidence in him by recognizing his "zeal, effectiveness, activity, and patriotism" in a letter.

When Congress is dissolved and President Fernández Madrid definitively withdraws from Santafé, the government and the council of Santafé remain in the hands of Lieutenant-Governor Estanislao Vergara.

On May 6, the armies of the Spanish King arrived in Santafé, which made Vergara go into hiding for a while. However, he later appeared before the purification council, and on July 10, he was sentenced to serve six years in the army by Pablo Morillo's decree. His sister Antonia Vergara Sanz de Santamaría tried to save him by offering large amounts of money and even offering to suffer the humiliation of asking for forgiveness from the murderers of her husband, José Gregorio Gutiérrez Moreno, who was shot by Morillo that same year.

When presented with offers from the family, the peacemaker Morillo decides to waive the prescribed sentence and instead demands payment of a sum of money. In a letter, he states, "I agree with the council's opinion to pay the thousand pesos, but without a deadline, since the needs of the army do not allow for it." - Morillo.

On July 22, the Vergara family had to pay a large amount of money for their freedom, leaving several family members in ruin and in debt to the royal coffers. After his release, he arrived in Santafé where he was compelled to revalidate his education as a lawyer. This was because Morillo didn't acknowledge degrees granted by the Republics. Finally, in 1817, he received his lawyer's degree from the Royal Court. He was then given the task of taking inventory of the books of the house botany and also served as a poor lawyer.

In August 1819, the people of Santafé were overjoyed upon receiving news about the Battle of Boyacá. Three days later, on August 10, a group of republicans held an extraordinary town hall meeting and established a provisional government. They appointed Estanislao Vergara as the delegate of Santafé to meet with El Libertador Simón Bolívar and inform him of the events occurring in the capital. On the same day, Bolívar made his entry into Santafé amidst a shower of flowers and martial music.

== Gran Colombia ==
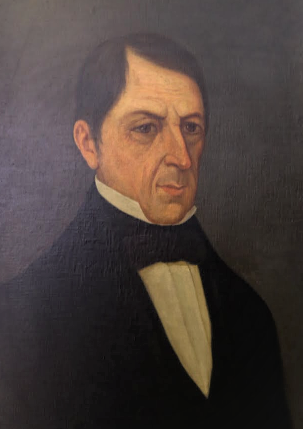

Bolívar appointed General Francisco de Paula Santander as vice president and divided the administration of New Granada into two departments. At Santander's request, Estanislao was appointed Secretary of the Interior and Justice between 1819 and 1821. He was one of the first to civilly organize the country in 1819 and to organize the public administration and judicial power. As Santander's secretary, he merits being one of the collaborators in founding and organizing the Republic of Colombia and Gran Colombia. On July 12, the second fundamental law of the Republic of Colombia was discussed in the Cúcuta congress, and on August 6, it was published in Bogotá by Vice President Santander and Secretary General Vergara.

In 1821, Simón Bolívar and Francisco de Paula Santander assumed the presidency and vice presidency respectively of Gran Colombia, outside of Bogotá. During their absence, Estanislao was appointed by Santander to head the government and exercised executive power for approximately two months, until November 9. During this time, he also held the positions of Secretary General and Secretary (Minister) of the Interior and Foreign Relations, making Vergara the first minister of this branch in Colombia. As such, he received the country's first foreign diplomatic agents in history. At the end of that year, he was summoned again by General Santander and was elected as a deputy for the province of Bogotá to take part in the Cúcuta congress. However, he was excused from attending the meetings so that he could stay by Santander's side and handle government affairs.

In December of the same year, Vice President Santander appointed him as the Mayor of Cundinamarca, which included the provinces of Bogotá, Antioquia, Mariquita, and Neiva. He held this position until April 1823 and made considerable efforts towards public education. He ensured that schools functioned well, and issued the Instructions for Pedano Mayors (municipal inspectors) of the City. This instruction incorporated severe Police actions, such as the appointment of a sentinel per block to advance the registration of Bogotá and detect unemployed people so that they could be immediately referred to the Army.

In 1822, he resigned from his position as mayor of Cundinamarca and was appointed as a senator for the Republic of Colombia. During his time as a senator, important laws were passed including the granting of a license for Bolívar to go to Peru, laws promoting immigration and naturalization of foreigners, and import regulations. On July 17, he introduced bills aimed at establishing the territorial division of the Republic and organizing the political regime of Colombia.

In 1824, he remained an active member of the Senate. During this time, he played a significant role in the creation of important legislation such as the ecclesiastical patronage laws, territorial division laws, laws for the extinction of estates, laws for the protection of national industry, the incorporation of the department of Quito, and the issuance of aid to Peru. Additionally, he served as the Mayor of Cundinamarca once again.

In 1825, he served as a minister, judge of the High Court of Justice, and member of the Government Council. Later, in 1826, he was appointed as the vice president of the Senate and then became the president of the Senate. In the same year, he was honored with a silver medal by the government of Peru, featuring the bust of The Liberator. He also became a member of the National Academy, which was established by Vice President Francisco de Paula Santander on March 18, 1826. He was one of the co-founders of the Central University of Colombia, which was opened on December 25, 1826. At this prestigious institution, he served as the deputy director and a professor in the faculty of jurisprudence.

He was a member of the philanthropic society and a member of the national academy that promoted knowledge, morality, and politics, it was made up of 21 people, called the most brilliant men of letters and science in Gran Colombia.

On February 10, 1828, he was appointed as the Secretary of Foreign Affairs to replace José Rafael Revenga. He also served as a deputy in the Ocaña convention. However, by the end of 1830, he returned to his work as a judge. When offered the position of government advisor, he refused but accepted the role of president of the electoral assembly. On September 11, 1828, while serving as the Minister of Foreign Affairs, he received news in Santander that he had been appointed as the plenipotentiary minister of Gran Colombia before the United States government. He served in various positions for three presidents - Simón Bolívar, Francisco de Paula Santander, and Rafael Urdaneta.

Sometime later, in the absence of the Liberator Dictator, Vergara became the president of Gran Colombia and was one of the figures closest to Bolívar in New Granada. He was called The Minister of the Liberator.

== Career ==
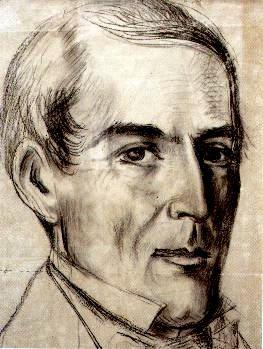
President Estanislao by José María Espinosa, National Museum of Colombia. 1830

During Bolívar's absence, Vergara served as a member of the State Ministry and led the executive branch. His role was crucial in advancing a project to establish a monarchy in Colombia. Empowered by the Council of Ministers, Vergara initiated contacts with Europe to explore the possibility of having a European monarch rule the country. He corresponded with Colombian ministers in Great Britain and France, specifically José Fernández Madrid and Leandro Palacios, expressing the council's preference for a French monarch. However, negotiations with Great Britain failed when the kingdom refused to approve a monarch of French origin for Colombia, despite Vergara's support.

Vergara's diplomatic activities, although initially secret, became public knowledge, leading to widespread opposition to the monarchical initiative. The opposition extended to Bolívar, who was aware of the council's efforts, but refrained from intervening. In an attempt to prevent intellectual Andrés Bello from leaving Colombia. Vergara proposed to Bolívar that he appoint Bello as Colombian ambassador to the United States. Bello rejected the offer as he had already been hired by the Chilean government for advisory work.

== Later years ==
The most significant opposition to the diplomatic work of the Council government came from General José María Córdova. He led a movement defending the Constitution of Cúcuta and took up arms to reject Bolívar's invitation to join the Council of Ministers as Secretary of the Navy.

Upon Bolívar's return to Bogotá, Vergara resigned his position as secretary and was replaced by General Domingo Caycedo. Vergara then participated as a deputy for Bogotá in the Congress and signed the Constitution of April 1830. He subsequently served as the Minister of the Interior under General Santander's administration.

In recognition of his service and his frail health, the Colombian Congress approved a lifetime pension of forty pesos per month for Vergara on April 13, 1855. Vergara died later that year.

== In popular Culture ==
The historical television series Bolívar (2019) features a character named José Miguel Camacho, portrayed by actor Fernando Lara for 21 episodes. The character's depiction of political discussions surrounding the establishment of a monarchy in Gran Colombia follows Vergara's real documented involvement in the constitutional monarchy proposal of 1829.
