= Sanz de Santamaría family =

Colonial Colombian family

- Aristocracy, political family
- Country: Colombia
- Earlier spellings: Saénz de Santamaría
- Origin: Sorzano, La Rioja, Spain
- Founder: José Bernardo Sáenz de Santa María
- Final ruler: Domingo Caycedo
- Connected families: Caicedo family París family Vergara family

The Sanz de Santamaría, Saenz de Santamaría or simply Santamaría family, are an aristocratic family from Colombia of Spanish origin, whose center of influence is the capital, Bogotá. They were an influential family during the 18th and 19th century. Its members include politicians, military, officials of the crown and the republic, businessmen, several former mayors of Bogotá, diplomats and two former presidents of Colombia.

== History ==
The surname was initially written as Sáenz de Santa María, but over the years became Sanz de Santamaría, the current form of the surname in Colombia. The short formː Santamaría is also used, conserving in Spain the use of Sáenz.

The first individual with the surname on American soil was the Spanish soldier José Bernardo Sáenz de Santamaría. His descendants became rich landowners and high bureaucrats from the high Colombian society.

The Sanz de Santamaría clan became really influential during the postcolonial period of Colombia alongside families such as the Lozanos, the Vergaras and the Caicedos they were one of the governing elites. They supported the Comuneros rebellion (1781).

Estanislao Vergara y Sanz de Santamaría	3° President of Gran Colombia
Domingo Caycedo y Sanz de Santamaría	4° & 7° President of Gran Colombia

Other notable member is Carlos Sanz de Santamaría, Former Minister of National Defence of Colombia.

== Toponymy and Legacy ==
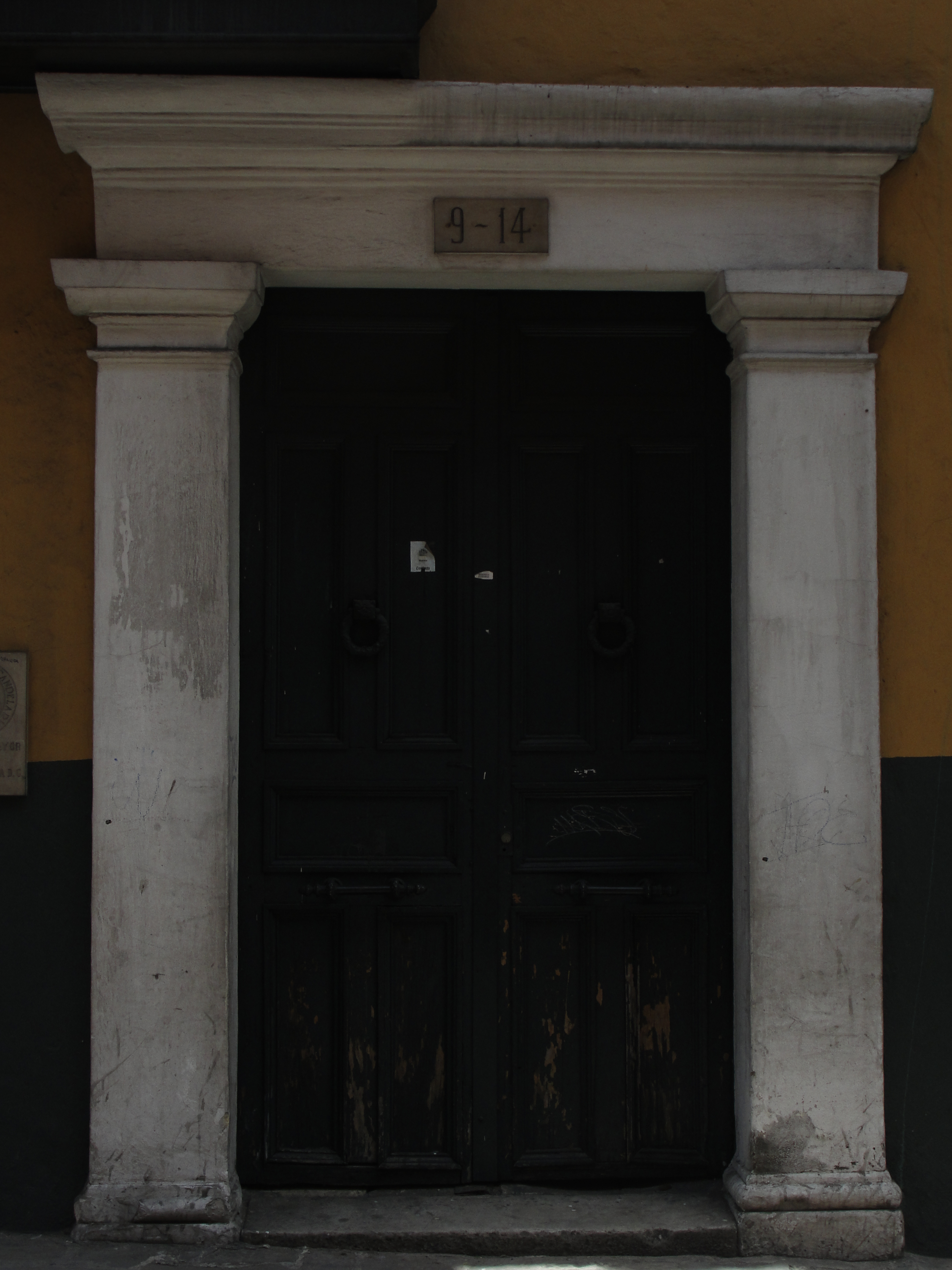
House of the Sanz de Santamaría Family, Bogotá, Colombia

- Casa Sanz de Santamaríaː Located in Carrera 5 # 9–10, Bogotá. Considered a national monument of Colombia. Historically significant residence is one of the tourist highlights in La Candelaria.
- Santamaría Bullring or plazaː Located in the San Diego sector. Considered a national monument of Colombia.
- Los Pinos Colombian club established in Bogotá by the Sanz de Santamaría family.

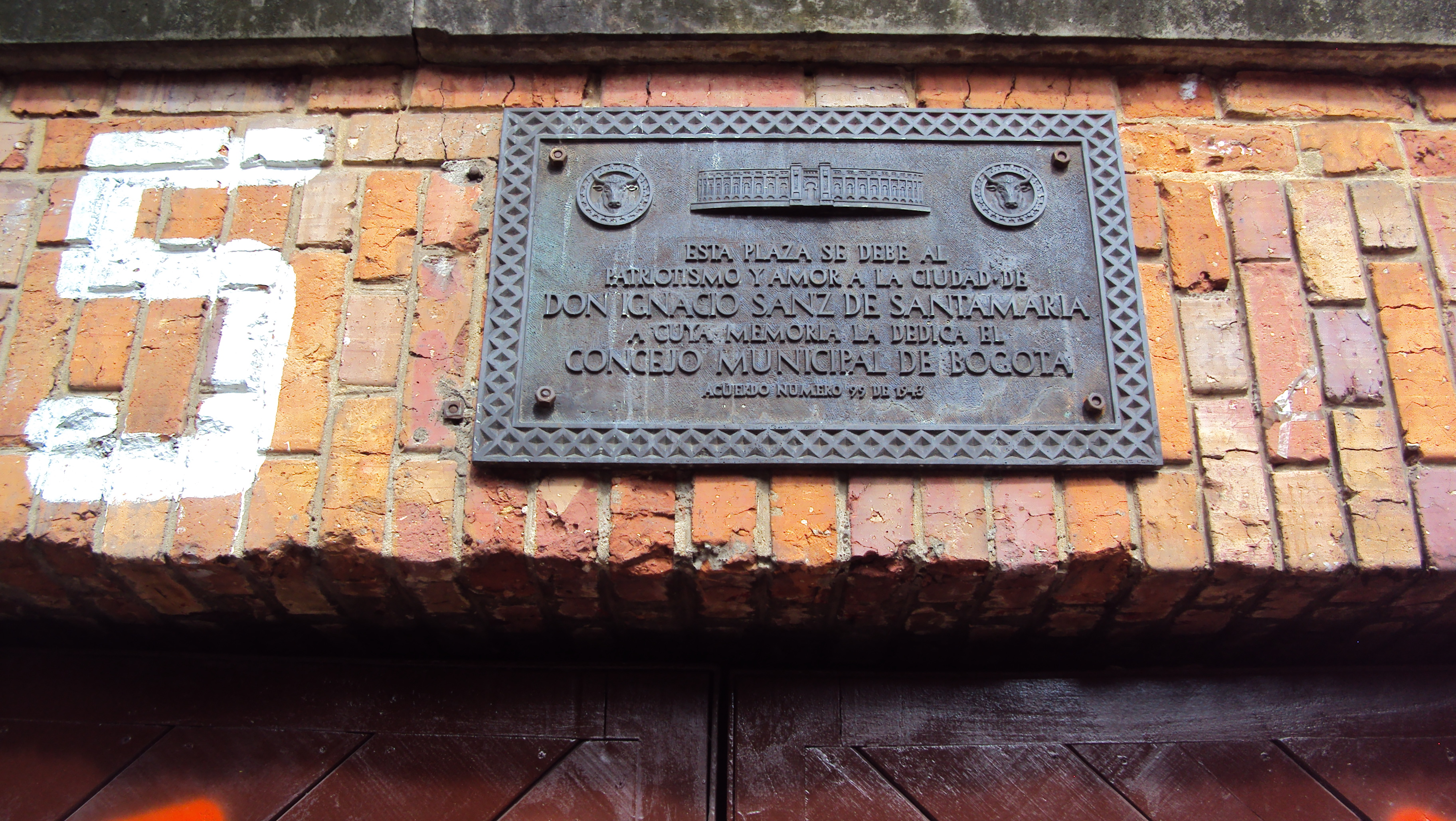
Inscription in Plaza de Toros Bogotá thar reads, "This plaza is due to the patriotism and love of Don Ignacio Sanz de Santamaria to whose memory the Municipal council of Bogota dedicates it"
