= Manuela Sanz de Santamaría =

- Born: 1740; Santafé, Viceroyalty of New Granada
- Died: 1817 (aged 76–77)
- Other name: "The wise woman of the colony"
- Occupations: polyglot and intellectual
- Years active: 1
- Known for: Literary salon called "Tertulia del Buen Gusto"
- Parent(s): Francisco Sanz de Santamaría; Petronila de Prieto Salazar y Ricaurte
- Relatives: José Sanz de Santamaría (brother); José Bernardo Sáenz de Santamaría (great-grandfather); Antonia Vergara y Sanz de Santamaría (niece); Estanislao Vergara y Sanz de Santamaría (nephew); Domingo Caycedo Sanz de Santamaría (nephew); Clemencia de Caycedo (brother-in-law's aunt)

María Manuela Sanz de Santamaría y Prieto de Salazar or Manuela Santamaría (Santafé de Bogotá 1740–1817) was a learned, polyglot, and intellectual woman from New Granada.

She was the most recognized intellectual in Santafé de Bogotá, in the Viceroyalty of New Granada (today's Colombia), founder of the literary salon "Tertulia del Buen Gusto" during the 18th and early 19th centuries.

Nicknamed "The wise woman of the colony," she was one of the most recognized figures of the time in the city of Santafé.

== Biography ==
She was born into an aristocratic family in Santafé, the daughter of Francisco Sanz de Santamaría, mayor of Santafé in 1753 and 1762, and Petronila de Prieto Salazar y Ricaurte, recognized figures of Santafé society. Her brother was José Sanz de Santamaría, a hero of Colombia.

She married Francisco Javier González-Manrique y Flórez on December 20, 1772.

In her home, the "Tertulia del Buen Gusto" was founded in 1801, contributing to the literary history of Colombia. The ideas of enlightenment, rationalism, and naturalism, which inspired the Independence generation, were discussed. These gatherings were activities to promote the exchange of ideas and healthy debate, and were social literary circles of the elite to discuss everyday, intellectual, and political topics. Political relationships, romances, and ideologies and movements were built there. Manuela's salon was open to both men and women, breaking the strict gender division in that colonial society.

Notable figures and poets such as José María Salazar, José Fernández Madrid, Camilo Torres, Francisco Antonio Ulloa, José Miguel Montalvo, Frutos Joaquín and his wife Josefa Ballén de Guzmán, who was an active member, Miguel de Pombo, and José María Gutiérrez, among others who would later become leaders in the independence movement, attended these gatherings. These gatherings were inspired by the Academia del Buen Gusto of the Marquesa de Sarria Josefa de Zúñiga y Castro.

The constant participation of women in Manuela's salons reflects and evidences the transcendence of women in Colombia's independence process. Women like Josefa Antonia Baraya, Josefa Ballén de Guzmán, and Manuela's daughter, Tomasa González Manrique y Sanz de Santamaría, attended these circles and later participated in the July 20, 1810, independence movements. Josefa Ballén and Francisca Prieto even guarded the viceroy's wife from the prison to the viceroy's palace. The women of independence wove social ties that favored the independence movement from their "traditional" roles as mothers, fostering spaces for discussion and debate.

“Doña Manuela was not only a literata but also a naturalist. She had a valuable and very curious cabinet of natural history, formed and classified by herself. At night, her salon was filled with all the literati of Santa Fe, and they spent the evening engaged in literary exercises, in which Doña Manuela and her two children, Tomasa and José Angel, who were in their early youth, took part.” says José María Vergara y Vergara.

Different scientific, literary, and political topics were discussed at the meetings, sometimes including subjects forbidden by the Spanish crown, so they met in secret.

She owned one of the largest natural history libraries in the viceroyalty, visited by both locals and foreigners like Baron Alexander von Humboldt, who praised the size of her library and referred to her as a "charming, cultured, and interesting lady."

José Manuel Groot, mentioning Baron Humboldt, says, “He went to visit her accompanied by some friends who had spoken much about Doña Manuela's talent and knowledge, and she received him with all the courtesies one would expect. The conversation, of course, was about natural sciences, in which our literata shone, speaking to the Baron with ease and competence. Then she introduced him to her small natural history cabinet, where she had more opportunity to shine, discussing each of the objects she presented to the Baron.”

Her daughter Tomasa Manrique Santamaría and her cousin Francisca Prieto y Ricaurte were members of this circle. Francisca met her future husband, Camilo Torres, at one of these gatherings.

Along with other prominent salons of the time like *La Patriótica* founded by Antonio Nariño, *La Sociedad de los Sabios* circle that met at the house of José Sanz de Santamaría, or *Eutropélica* of Manuel del Socorro Rodríguez de la Victoria, Manuela Sanz de Santamaría's was outstanding, nicknamed *The wise woman of the colony*.

== Bibliography ==
- Lara Betancourt, Patricia. “La sala doméstica en Santa Fe de Bogotá, siglo XIX, el decorado: la sala barroca”, in Historia Crítica, Universidad de los Andes, núm. 20, julio-diciembre, 2001.
- Liévano, Roberto. “Tertulias literarias en Santafé y en Bogotá”, in Revista Cultura, vol. 5, núm. 25–30, Santafé de Bogotá, enero-junio de 1918.
- Monsalve, José Dolores. Heroínas de la independencia. 2nd ed., Bogotá, Academia Colombiana de Historia, 2010.
- Uribe Pinto, Roberto. “Las tertulias literarias en Bogotá”, in Boletín de la Academia Colombiana, tomo XLVII, núm. 195, Santafé de Bogotá, enero-febrero-marzo de 1997.
- Vergara y Vergara, José. Historia de la literatura en Nueva Granada. Bogotá, Talleres Gráficos del Banco Popular, 1974.
