= Vergara family =

Aristocratic family

- Aristocracy, political family
- Country: Spain; Colombia; Chile; United States
- Current region: Americas and Europe
- Earlier spellings: Bergara
- Etymology: Elevated Fern
- Origin: Vergara, Guipúzcoa, Spain

The Vergara or Vergara-Azcárate family is a Hispanic noble lineage that traces its origins to the medieval kingdoms of Navarre and Castile and established an influential branch in the New Kingdom of Granada (present-day Colombia) in the 17th century. The family is spread across several branches in Spain, Colombia, Chile and the US.

The Vergara family is considered as one of the first families of Spaniards in the Americas that arrived first as conquistadors, then as royal officers of the Spanish crown. The Vergara Family have produced four presidents of Colombia by the same surname; and three more related by blood. Another branch is considered amongst the founding families of Chile.

Originally from basque and navarrese lineages, more specifically from Bergara, a municipality in Basque Country. Vergara is a toponymic named after the Spanish version of the Basque region of Bergara found in Gipuzkoa, Basque Country. In Spain, many families adopted this trend of using a toponymic surname to associate themselves with a place or a noble house.

== History ==
=== Spain ===
Vergara-Azcarate
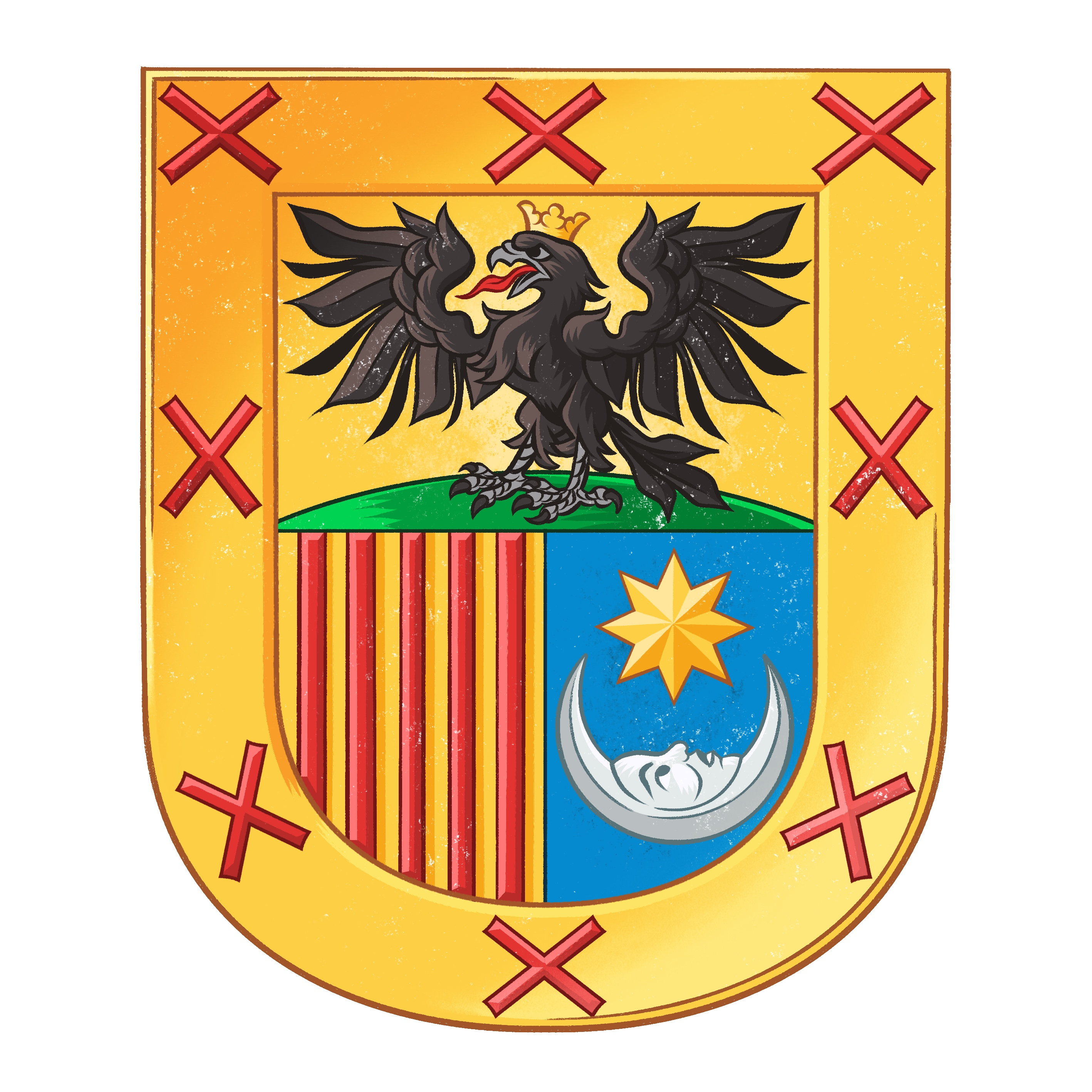
- Coat of arms of the Vergara Azcarate family

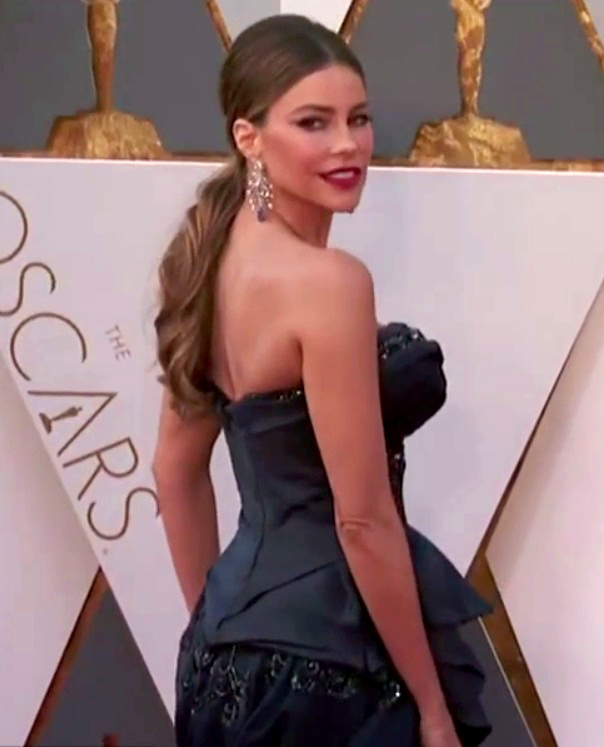
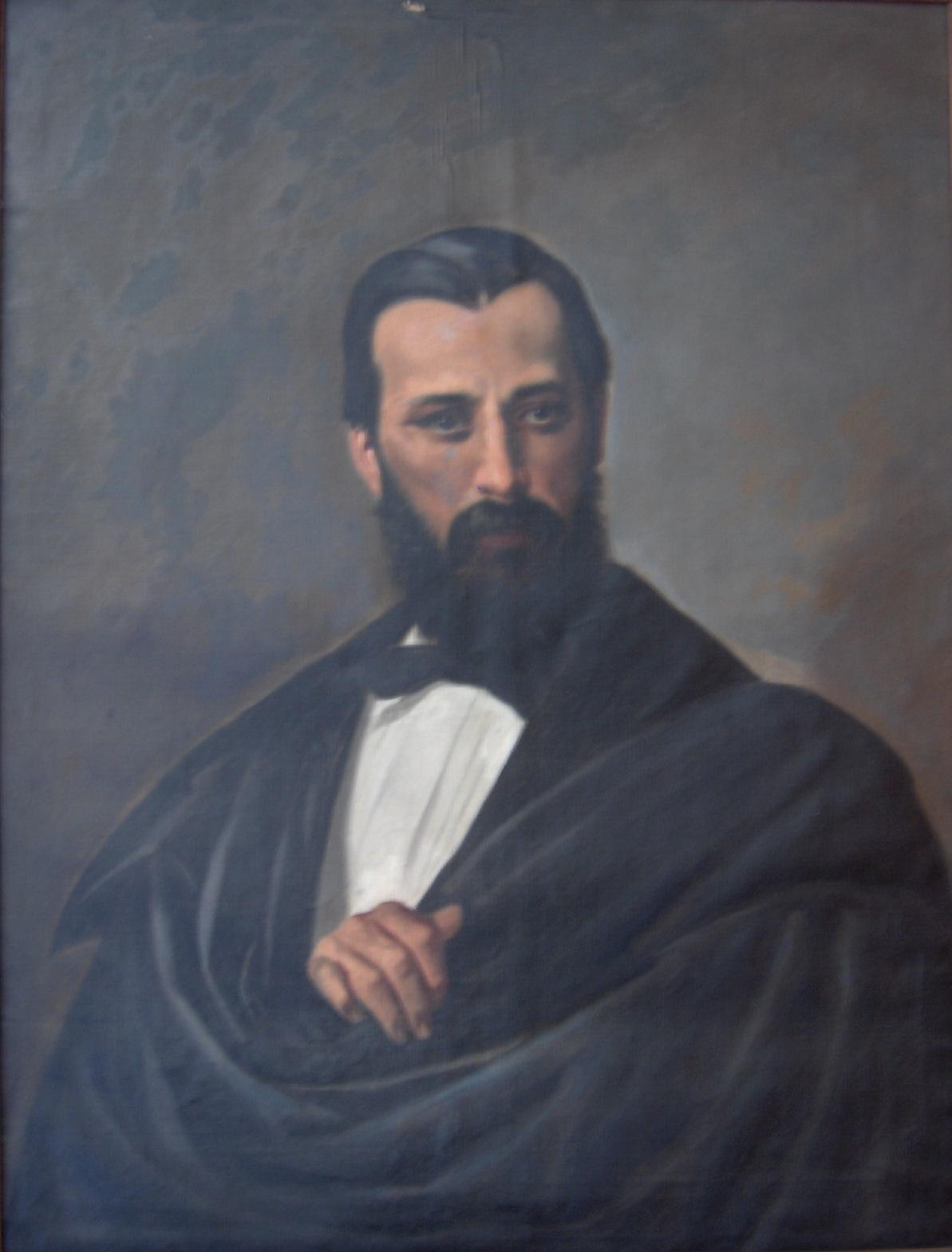
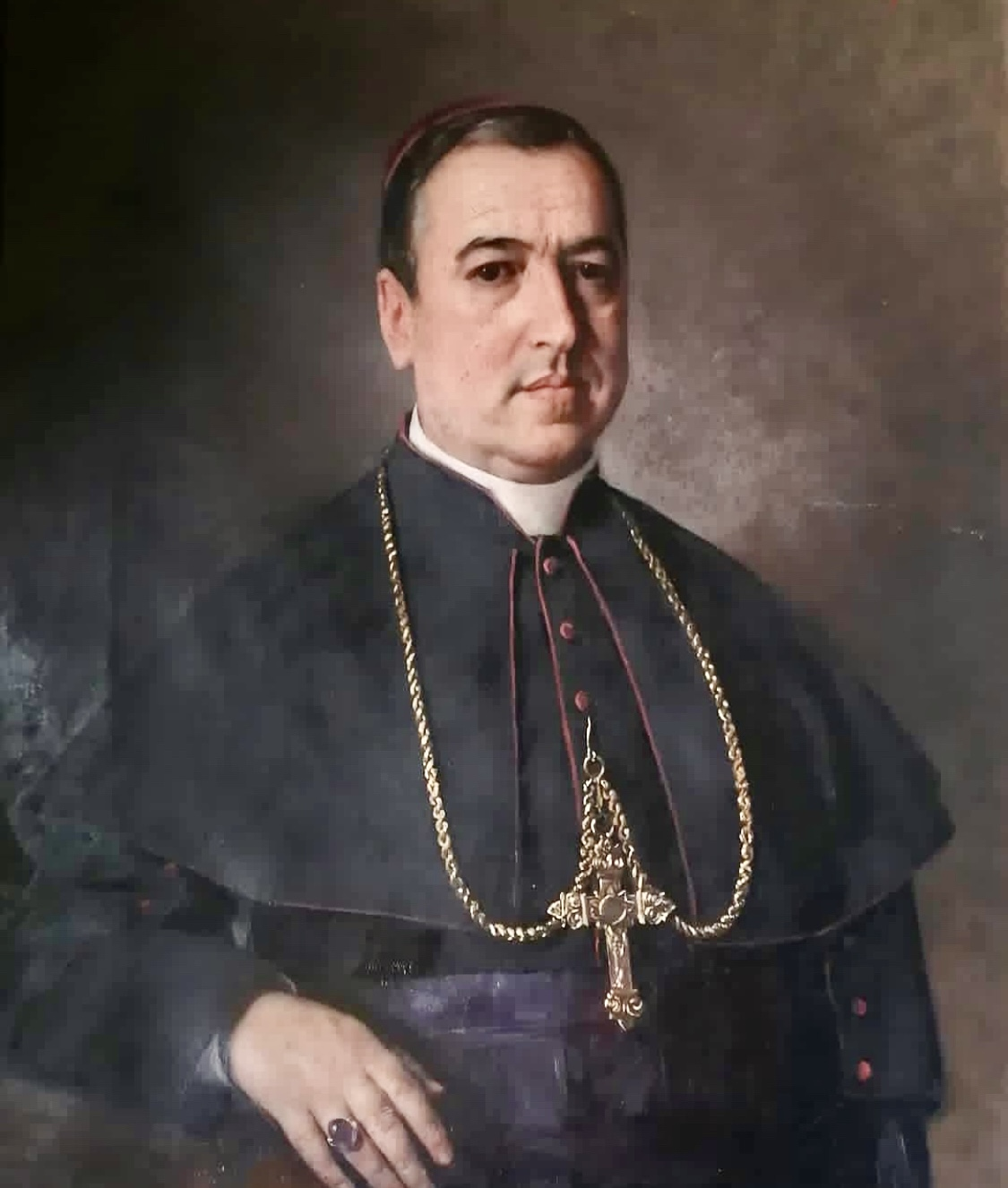
- Sofía Vergara José María Vergara y Vergara Joaquín Pardo Vergara
- Current region: Colombia, Spain, United States
- Earlier spellings: Azcarate de Vergara, Vergara y Azcarate
- Etymology: Derives from Ascarat and Vergara in Spain
- Origin: Bergara, Gipuzkoa, Spain
- Founded: Cádiz, Spain Bogotá, Colombia 1621; 405 years ago
- Founder: Antonio de Vergara Azcárate
- Final ruler: Ignacio Gutierrez Vergara
- Titles: List: President of Colombia; President of Gran Colombia; President of the Grenadine Confederation; Regent of Spain (President of the Regency of the Kingdom of Spain); Acting Head of Government of Gran Colombia (1821); Colombia Secretary of War; Gran Colombia Secretary of Foreign Affairs; Secretary of Interior and Justice of Gran Colombia; Secretary General / Minister of Interior and Foreign Affairs of Gran Colombia; President of the Government Council of New Granada; Secretary of the High Court of Gran Colombia; President of the Senate of Gran Colombia; Vice-President of the Senate of New Granada; Senator of New Granada (Bogotá); Member of the Colombia House of Representatives; Judge of the Viceroyalty of New Granada; Secretary of Justice of New Granada; Governor of Cundinamarca; Governor of Boyacá; Regent Chief Accountant of the Court of Accounts of the Royal Audiencia of the New Kingdom of Granada; Ambassador of Gran Colombia to the United Kingdom; Governor-General of Cartagena de Indias; Governor of Maracaibo; Governor of Mérida; Governor of La Grita; Governor of Cauca; State senator (Cundinamarca); State representative (Cundinamarca); Mayor of Bogotá
- Connected families: Arboleda family Caicedo family Mosquera family Sanz de Santamaría family Wiesner family
- Traditions: Roman Catholic Church
- Estates: Azcarate Palace, Capilla del Sagrario, Hacienda Casablanca
- Website: archivovergara.com

The Vergara-Azcarate's are descendents of Spanish conquistadors, and rural nobility. By the later middle ages, in Navarre, Spain they were a family with armery, meaning they had the right to have coat of arms and be considered a well known house in the Basque country. A branch of the family existed in Castile. Diego López de Medrano y Vergara, Lord of San Gregorio and the son of Catalina de Vergara, was an important nobleman in the kingdom of Castile during the late medieval period. During the Middle Ages they founded different houses in Abalcisqueta, Azcoitia, Azpeitia, Berástegui, Cizúrquil, Elgóibar, Elduayen, Elgóibar, Elgueta. Oñate, San Sebastián, Tolosa y Bergara. In 1391 the mayor of Bergara, Spain, was Juan Martínez de Azcarate, later in 1515 his descendant, the Baron Martin de Vergara y Azcarate moved to Getafe and changed his last name from Azcarate to Vergara y Azcarate after his hometown, making the family be known as The Vergaras from that point forward, then obtained a royal ejecutoria de hidalguía (confirmation of noble status).

Martin's grandson was Lieutenant Captain General Francisco de Vergara y Azcarate, born in Móstoles, Spain in 1570. Entered into the service of the spanish crown as a soldier for all his youth and later fought in the well known Tercios españoles in Flanders and Italy, also participated in the 1588 armada campaign in different parts of Europe including Portugal, Burgundy and the Netherlands.

He died in the fortress of San Felipe de la Marmora after having also held the rank of maestre de campo. his eldest son Antonio, benefited from ejecutorias of nobility and was the first to travel to the new world.

=== New Granada ===
The family arrived in the Americas as Spanish royal officers between the sixteenth and seventeenth centuries and quickly married into aristocratic families descendants of the first conquistadors, founders of the New Kingdom who first arrived with Gonzalo Jimenez de Quesada. Family writers trace roots to Antón de Olaya, Juan de Olmos and Cristobal Bernal, three of the first 177 men who arrived and conquered the Muiscas in the early sixteenth century for the spanish empire.

Antonio de Vergara Azcárate would follow the steps of his father, as a young orphan boy traveled all the time with his uncle Alonso Turrillo de Yebra, a royal engineer set to the new world to build fortifications in Cartagena, Turrillo later received a royal contract to establish the first mint in Santafe, capital of the new kingdom of Granada and act as the governor of Antioquia. Antonio arrived in Cartagena de Indias in 1621 and later became a knight of the Order of Santiago, encomendero and royal treasurer with seat and vote in the cabildo with access to accounts of gold and silver coinage. In this capacity he also served as regidor, repeatedly acting as mayor of Santafe when needed in 1638, 1644, 1659 and 1674. Antonio founded one of the most interesting family sagas of the New Kingdom of Granada (Colombia), today known for figures such as José and Francisco de Vergara Azcárate, Simon Bolivar´s close circle general José María Vergara Lozano, Estanislao Vergara and governor Cristóbal Vergara.

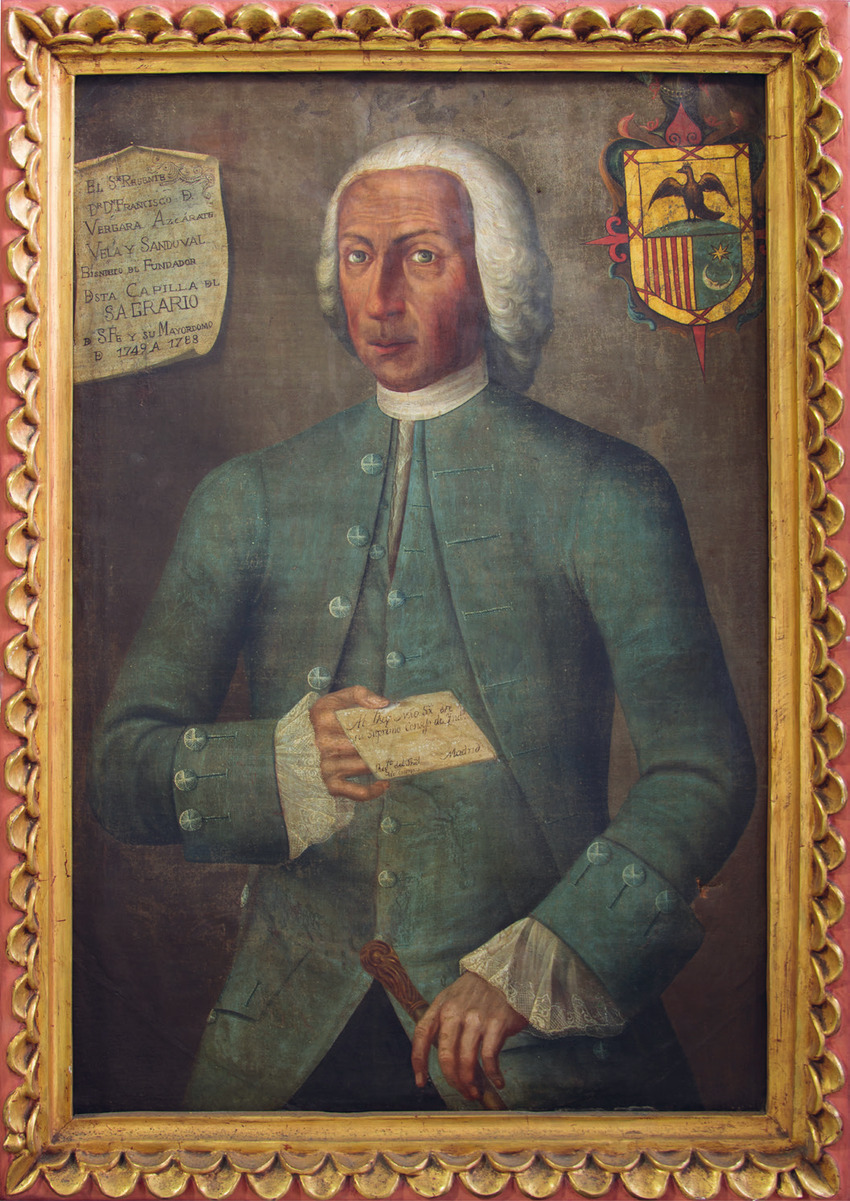
Francisco José Manuel Vergara Azcarate

The Vergara family became a distinguished, powerful, and aristocratic lineage within the society of the Bogotá savanna. Their prominence in the late colonial period and in the subsequent republics stemmed partly from their alliances with other influential criollo families, including the Arboleda, Caicedo, Vélez, Sanz de Santamaría, Ricaurte, Lozano, Manrique, and Mosquera families. Together, these lineages formed the core of the New Granada elite at the end of the viceregal era and the beginning of independent Colombia.

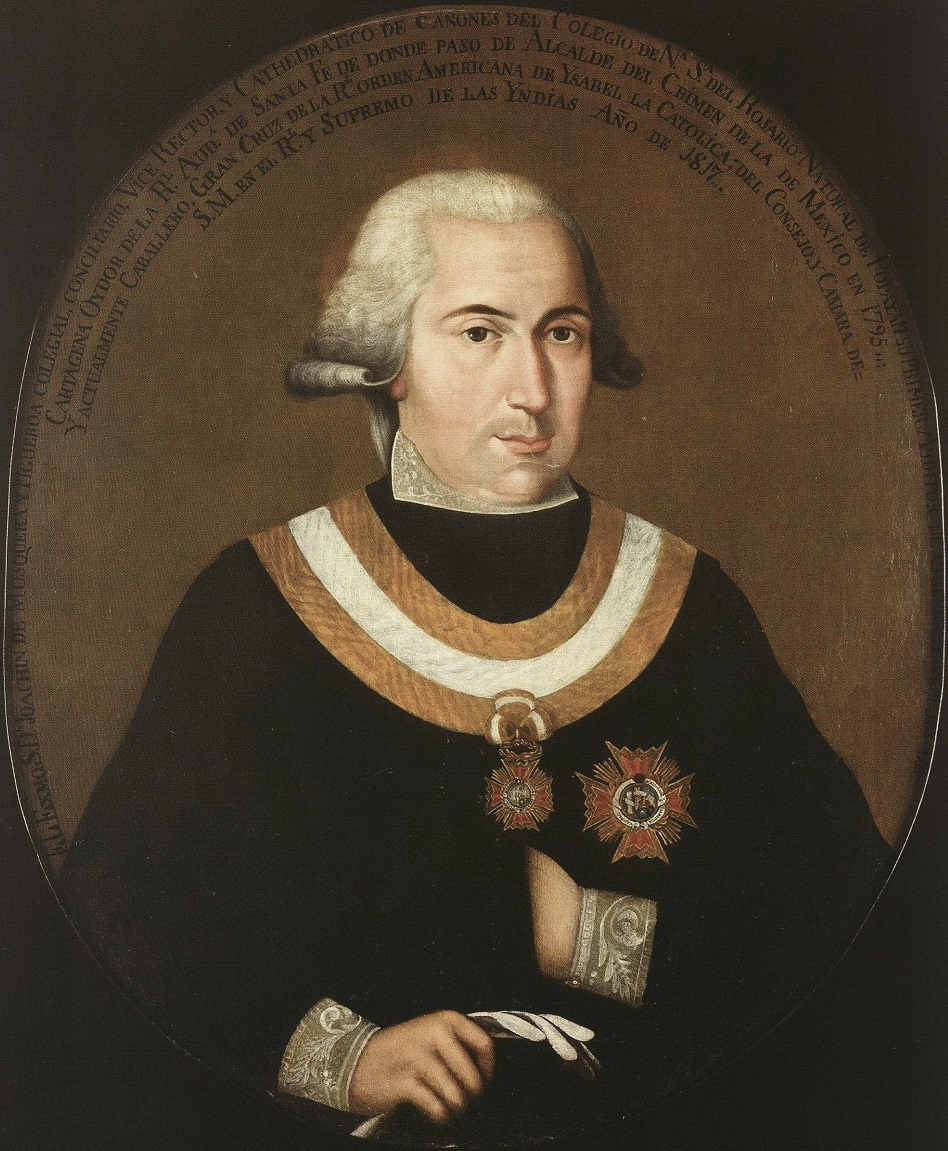
Joaquín de Mosquera Figueroa y Arboleda Vergara

In the new kingdom of New Granada, during the 18th and 19th century (1740s–1810s) they were considered one of the oldest and more aristocratic families of Colombia they consolidated great influence, being one of the first bureaucratic dynasties and political clans of Colombia.

They also held high administrative positions during the trancission such as Regent Chief Accountant of the Court of Accounts of the Royal Audiencia of the New Kingdom of Granada, and, in one notable case is Joaquín Mosquera Figueroa, who held the Regency of Spain itself, acting as Regent Council of the Realm, basically head of state of the Spanish Empire in 1812. Across the transition from colony to republic, they continued to occupy a wide range of administrative, fiscal, and governmental posts for and against the crown.

=== Colombia ===
Several members of the extended Vergara-Azcárate family participated in the political and military processes that led to independence from Spain and in the subsequent republican governments such as the United Provinces of New Granada, Gran Colombia and the Republic of Colombia during the nineteenth century.

In addition, members and relatives of the family served alongside Simón Bolívar acting as governors, mayors, secretaries and ambassadors like José María Vergara Lozano the Ambassador of Gran Colombia to the United Kingdom in 1822, who was the grandson of the first marquis of San Jorge of Bogotá, Jorge Miguel Lozano de Peralta, others were cabinet ministers, senators, state legislators, judges of the old colonial and new republican courts, senior judicial officers, military commanders.

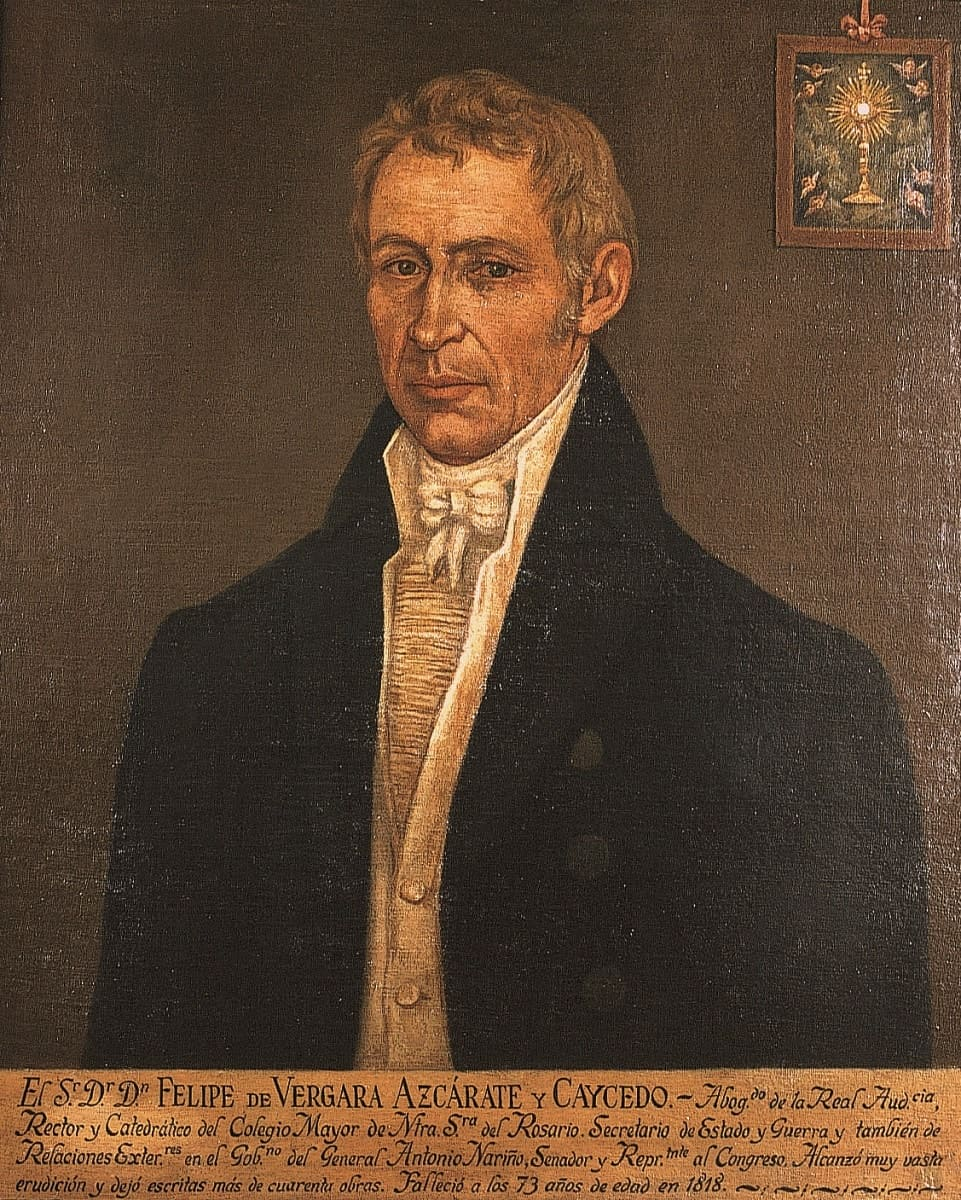
Felipe de Vergara Azcárate

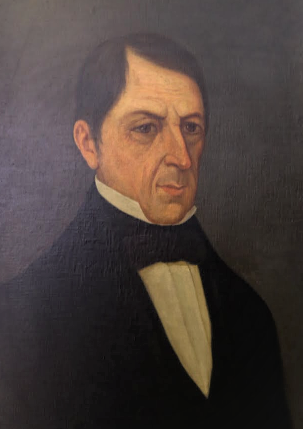
Estanislao Vergara

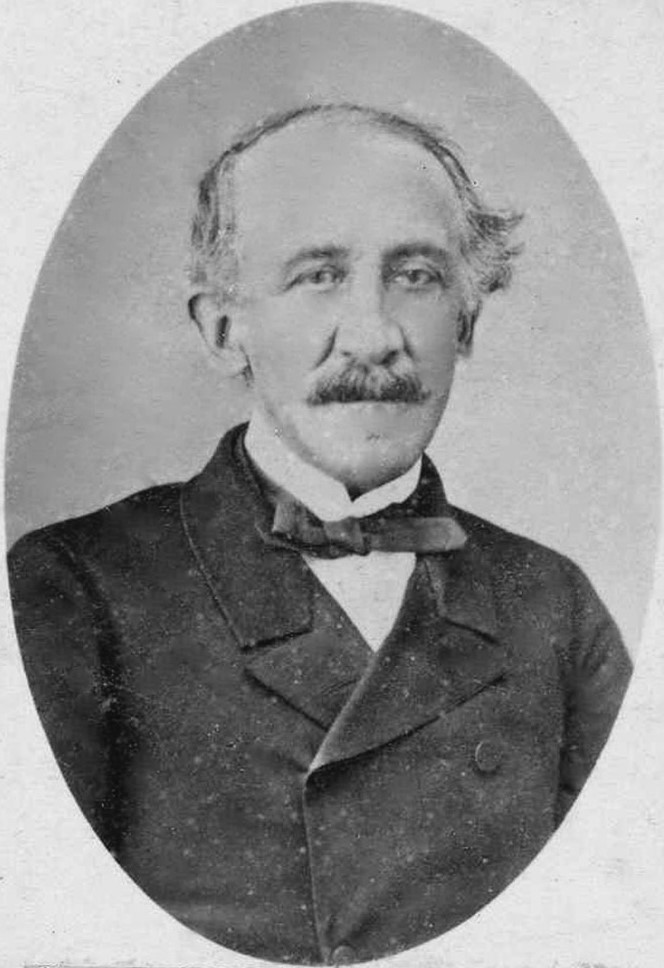
Ignacio Gutierrez Vergara

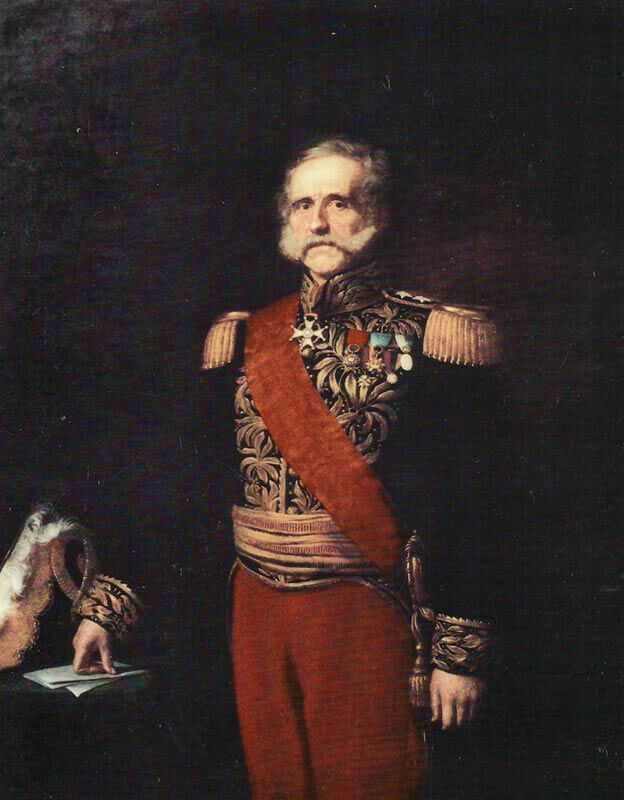
Tomás Cipriano de Mosquera

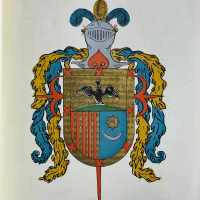

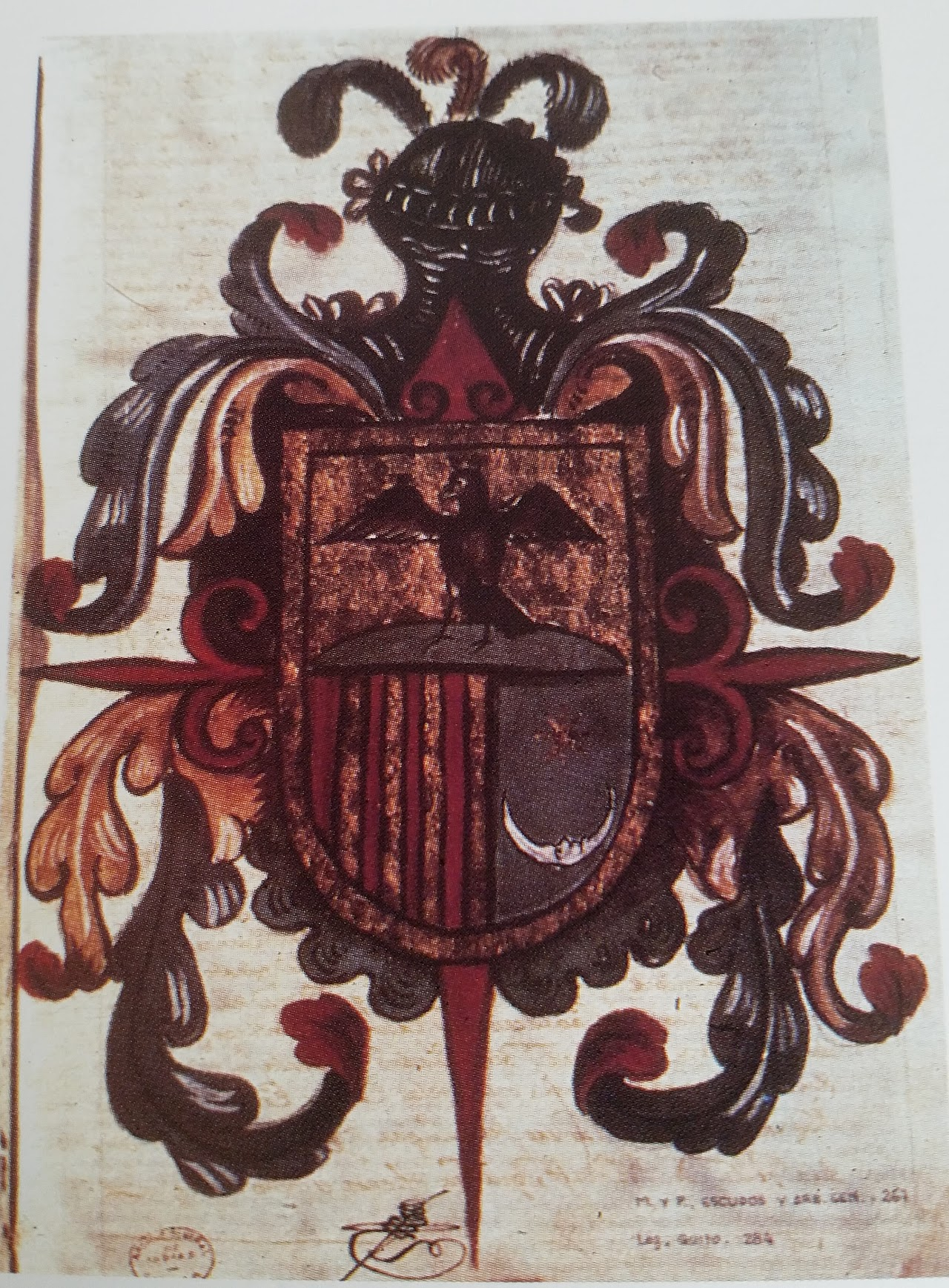

Within more than 15 generations have participated in the history of Colombia in its different periods from the colony, to the independence and the republics. They have had several influential members in the country, including four presidents; of which there are seven, who are members or are related to the family by blood or affinity, most of them in the xix century, names like founding fathers of the United provinces of New Granada Luis Ayala Vergara and Felipe de Vergara, or Estanislao Vergara who was designated president of Gran Colombia by Simón Bolívar or Joaquín and Tomás Cipriano de Mosquera who were presidents for multiple terms and later fought against his relative Ignacio Gutiérrez Vergara in the Colombian Civil war (1860 -1862). In later generations, others distinguished themselves as writers like José María Vergara and Saturnino Vergara, lawyers, architects, businessmen, and lately recognized colombian american actresses in the United States like Sandra Vergara and Sofía Vergara.

==== Heraldry ====
Coat of arms of the Vergara Azcarate family
Granted 1651 Armiger All the descendants of Antonio de Vergara Azcárate (1611–1690) Crest A steel helmet affronty with ten bars, mantled Azure and Or, surmounted by three ostrich feathers, two Azure and one Or in the centre. Escutcheon Mantelé: in chief Or an eagle displayed Sable crowned Or standing on a mount Vert; in base per fess, dexter Gules five pallets Or, sinister Azure a crescent Argent surmounted by an eight-pointed star Or; all within a bordure Or charged with eight saltires Gules; the shield set on a red Cross of Santiago. Symbolism The crowned black eagle on gold represents noble rank and loyal service to the Spanish Crown; the red and gold pales evoke long military service for the spanish crown and Iberian heraldic tradition; the crescent and eight-pointed star on blue refer to Marian devotion and victory over adversity; the saltires and the Cross of Santiago underline the family's Christian faith and membership in the Order of Santiago.

=== Chile ===
Vergara
- Coat of arms of the Vergara family of Chile

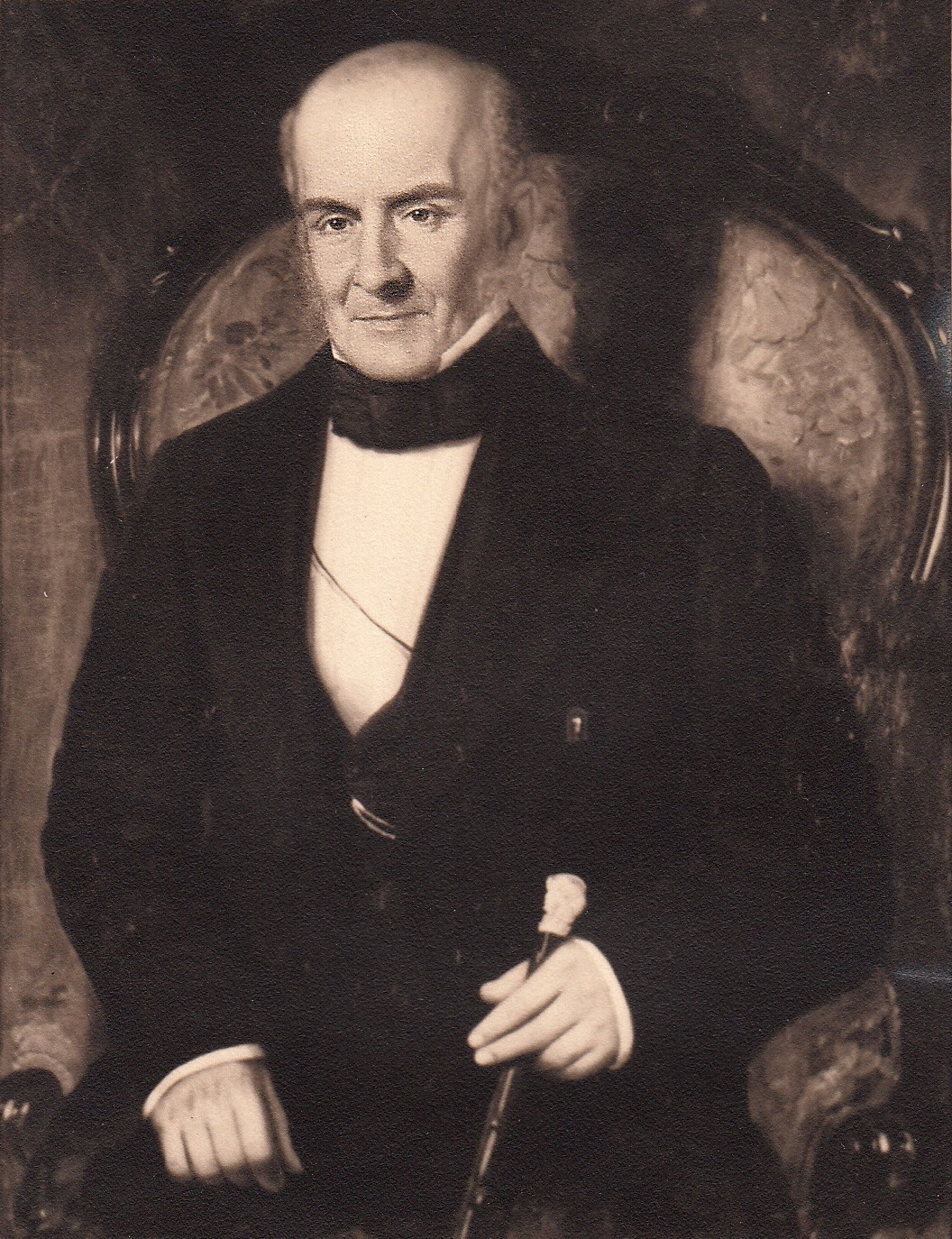
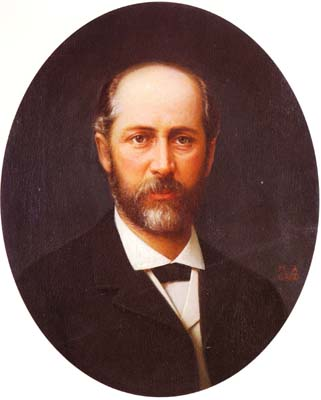
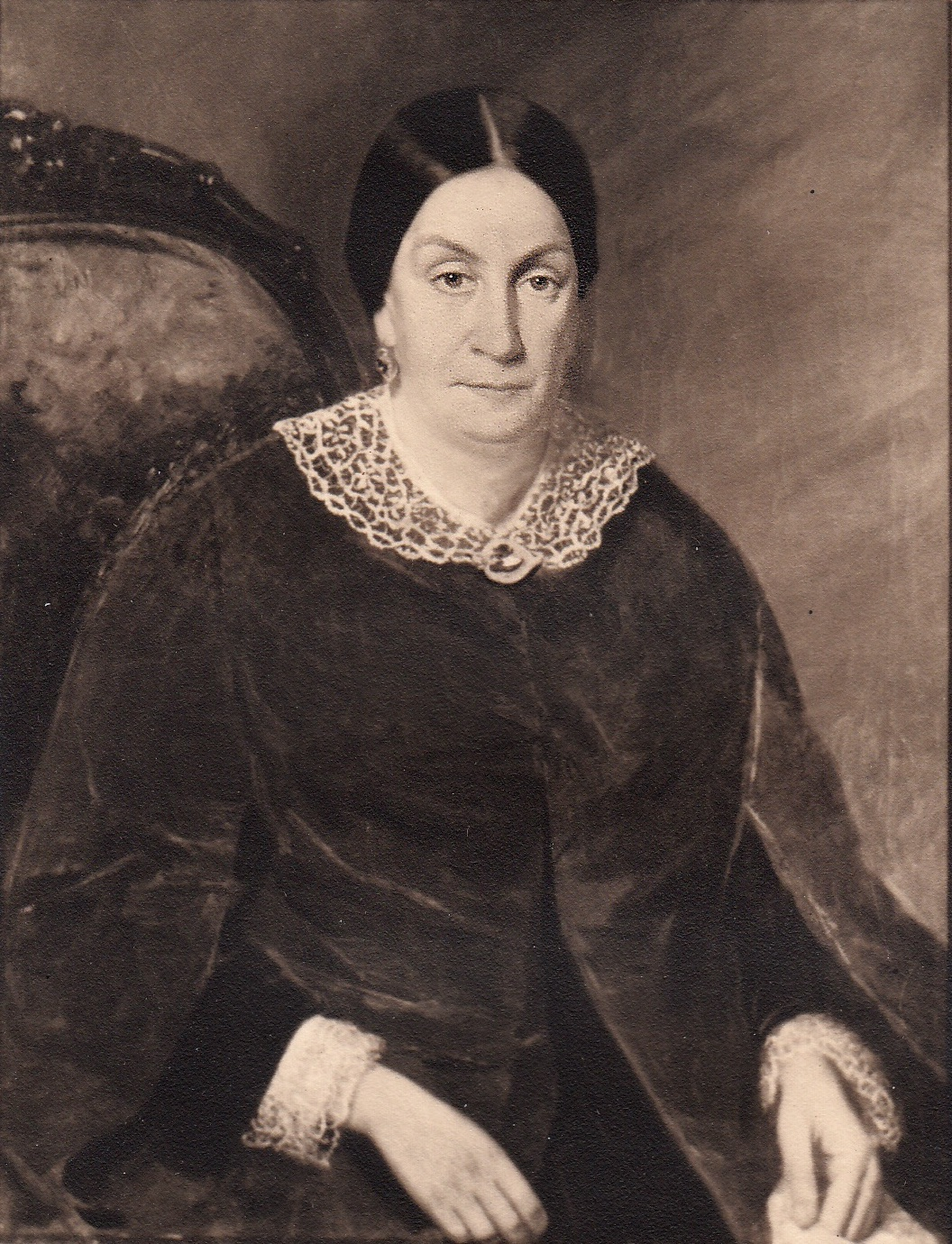
- Titles: List: Senator of the Republic of Chile; Presidential Candidate of the Republic of Chile; Minister of the Interior and Public Security of Chile; Minister of War and Navy of Chile; Governor of the Talca Province; Deputy of the Chamber of Deputies of Chile
- Estates: Viña del Mar, Vergara Palace

Considered one of the founding families of Chile, members served in politics, journalism, and the military, others are part of the high society of Chile and among the colonial elite of the country. The family has been Commemorated in various ways, more specifically the war hero and politician José Francisco Vergara founder of Viña del Mar, and owner of the Vergara Palace located in the same city.

==== Santiago ====
The branch that settled in the capital was founded by the captain Gaspar de Vergara, born in Villaflores, Salamanca, of Basque origin and son of the secretary of Bergara and Maria Hernandez Jiron. He arrived in Chile in 1536, joining Diego de Almagro's expeditions and then, in 1540, with Pedro de Valdivia onto the founding of Santiago, Chile. He never married though he recognized his children, all daughters:

Children

1. Ines de Vergara, married to Sebastian Garcia
2. Luisa de Vergara, married to Juan Fernandez Garces and then to Antonio Lozano
3. Francisca de Vergara, married to captain Cristobal Salvador Celaya. Their son Gaspar Salvador de Vergara carried the Vergara name to his descendants

Second migration: In the second half of the 18th century, another member of the broader Vergara family came to Chile: Antonio de Vergara, who married Manuela Garcia.

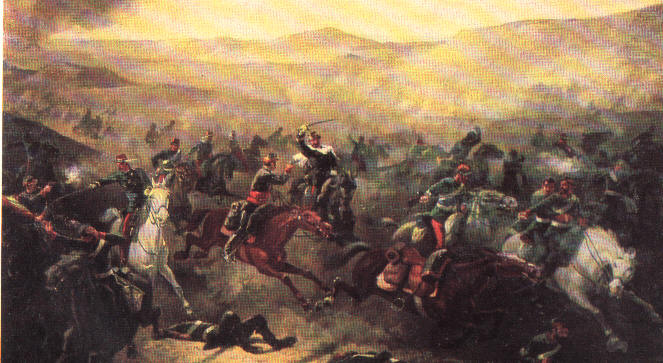
José Francisco Vergara at the Battle of Pampa Germania.

==== Talca ====
Another branch settled in Talca, which was of ancient nobility with proofs accepted by the Sovereign Military Order of Malta and the Sacred Military Constantinian Order of Saint George was founded by royal lieutenant, Juan Martínez de Vergara, born in Gibraleon, Huelva and died in Chimbarongo, Colchagua in 1662.

A hidalgo, he arrived in South America destined for Chile and the War of Arauco in 1601. He was enlisted in the troops who accompanied Governor Alonso de Ribera, who was considered the organizer of the army in the kingdom of Chile. He was in the company commanded by Captain Gines de Lillo and helped with his arms in the forts of Santa Fe and Talcahuano. In 1628 he was already in the rank of captain. He was the backbone one of the most important Chilean colonial families and given an encomienda for his services to the Spanish Crown.

Son of Juan Martínez de Vergara, a native of Guipuzcoa and Isabel Alonso Marquez of Gibraleón. She was the daughter of Teresa Alonso Marquez, and of the same region.

In 1634 he married Magdalena de Leiva Sepulveda, daughter of a Sevillian captain, Antonio de Leiva Sepulveda and Mariana de la Cerda Niza y Corral.

Children

1. Juan Martínez de Vergara y Leiva Sepulveda born in Chillán in 1645 and married on 22 October 1670 in Santiago with Ana Gomez Ceballo y Ugarte Escobar. He died at his ranch in Talcamo (Talca) on 18 January 1723.
2. Isabel Martínez de Vergara y Sepulveda Leiva married an Asturian Maestre de Campo, Pedro Fernández de Albuerne Ondina. He wrote his will on his ranch in San Francisco Talcamo (Talca) Paguelo on 11 December 1676 and died in 1677.
3. Mariana Leiva Martínez de Vergara y Sepulveda married on 8 July 1662 in Nancagua with the Spanish gentleman, Lieutenant José Antonio de Labra y Vega, a native of Cangas de Onis and Maestre de Campo in 1660. She died 8 March 1702.
4. Francisca Martínez de Vergara y Sepulveda married Rodrigo Leiva Verdugo de Sarria y de la Corte.
5. Jacinta Martinez Vergara y Sepulveda married Domingo Valdés y Fernandez de Villalobos.

==== La Serena ====
Another branch established itself in La Serena, Chile by Francisco de Vergara in the 18th century who married Maria Antonia de Santelices Corbalan.

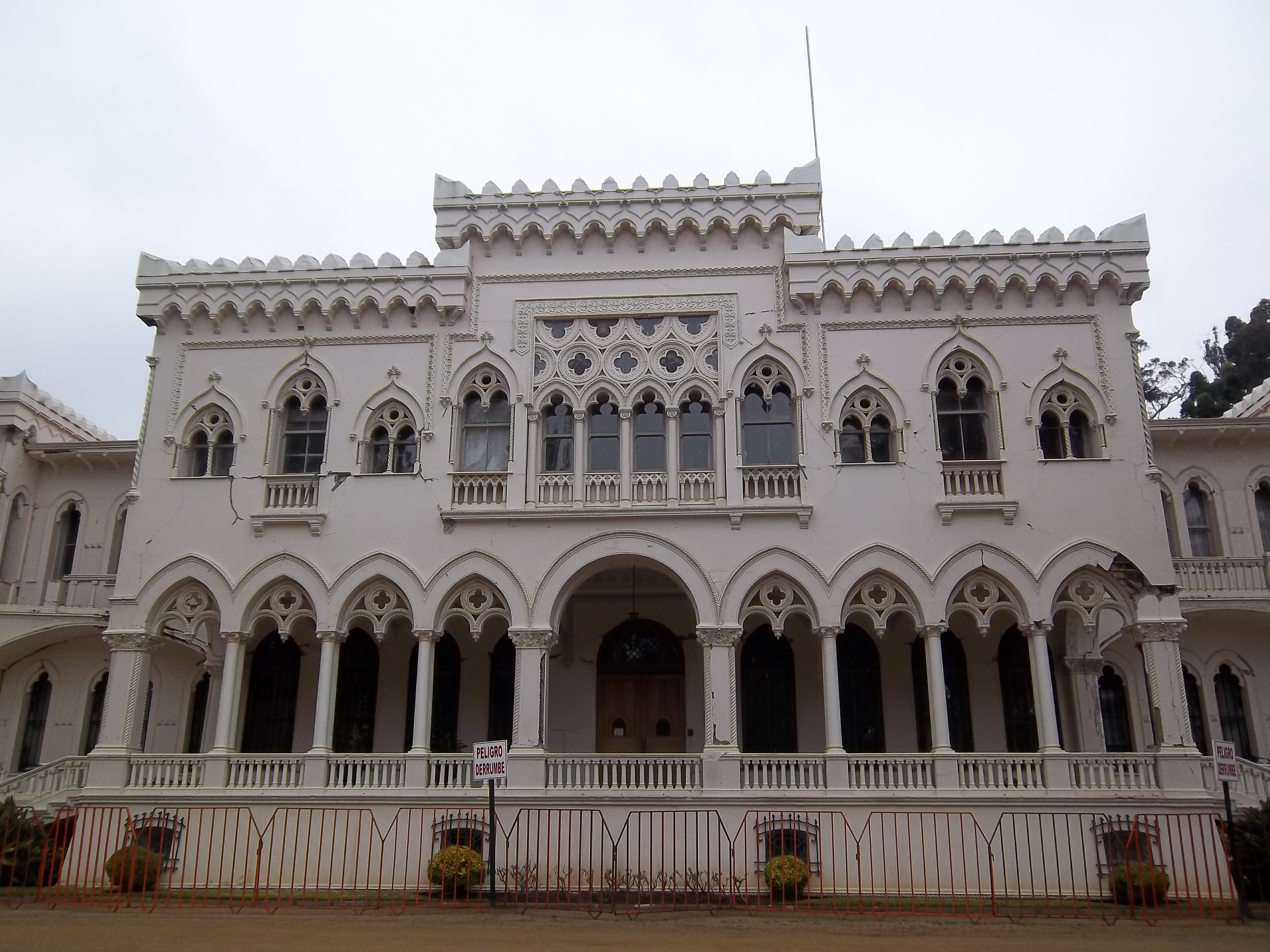
Quinta Vergara

==== Legacy ====
- Quinta Vergara park in the commune of Viña del Mar where the private residence of José Francisco Vergara was located (Palacio Vergara)
- Logia "José Francisco Vergara" No. 105 of the city of Viña del Mar (Great Lodge of Chile)
- First Fire Company of Viña del Mar, of which he was a founding member on August 20, 1884, which after reorganizing on April 13, 1913, was renamed "Bomba José Francisco Vergara."

== Toponymy ==
- Bergara, Gipuzkoa, Spain
- Quinta Vergara, Viña del Mar, Chile
- Vergara River, Chile
- Vergara, Cundinamarca, Colombia
- Vergara, Uruguay
- Convention of Vergara, treaty concluding Spain's First Carlist War
- Vergara v. California, U.S. court case
- Los Vergara, Jalisco, Mexico
- Augusto Vergara Airport, Los Santos, Panama
- Vergara (disambiguation)

== See Also ==
- 2nd Combat Engineer Battalion Vergara Velasco (Colombia)
- New Kingdom of Granada
- Viceroyalty of New Granada
- Colombian War of Independence
- History of Colombia
- History of Chile

== Bibliography ==
- Flórez de Ocáriz, J. (1674). Libro primero de las genealogías del Nuevo Reyno de Granada. Madrid, Spain: Joseph Fernández de Buendía
- Restrepo Sáenz, J. M., & Rivas, R. (1928). Genealogías de Santa Fe de Bogotá (Vol. 1). Bogotá, Colombia: Librería Colombiana
- Vergara Azcárate, F. d. (1962). Relación genealógica. Colombia: Kelly.
- Vergara y Vergara, J. M. (1867). Historia de la literatura en Nueva Granada: Desde la conquista hasta la independencia (1538–1820). Bogotá, Colombia: Imprenta de Echeverría Hermanos.
- Vergara y Vergara, J. C. (1952). Don Antonio de Vergara Azcárate y sus descendientes: La colonia. La independencia. Spain: Impr. J. Pueyo.
- Vergara y Vergara, J. C. (1951). Vida de Estanislao Vergara. Colombia: Iqueima.
