= Pastrana family =

Colombian family of Spanish origins

Pastrana
- Aristocracy, political family
- Coat of arms of the Pastrana Arango family

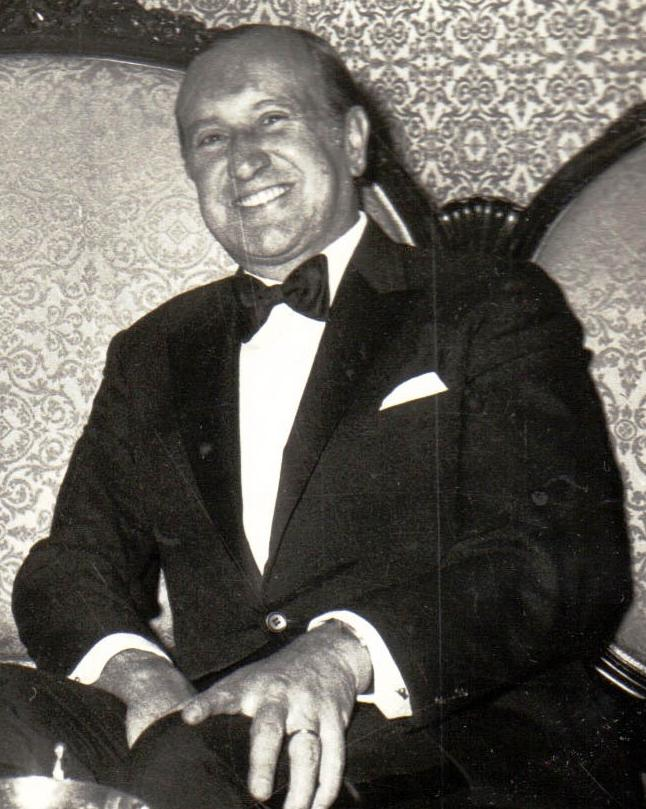
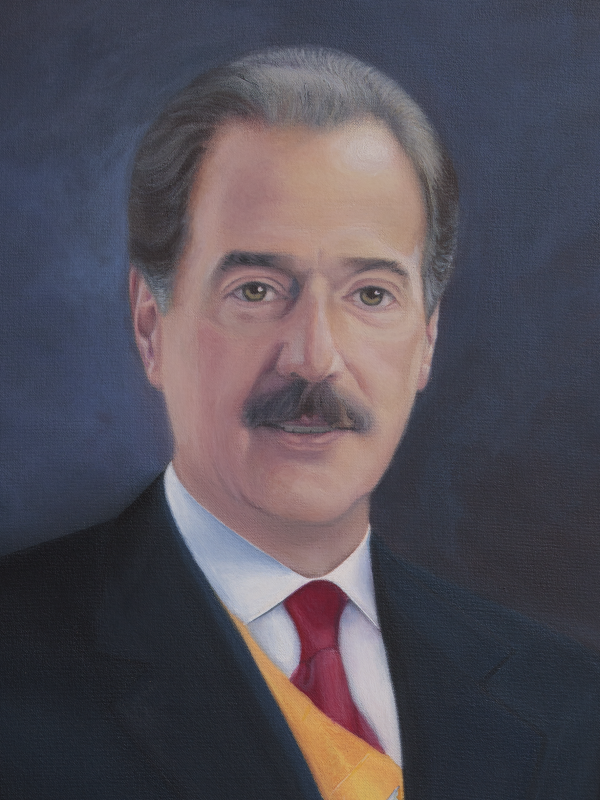
- Misael Pastrana Andrés Pastrana
- Founder: Justiniano Coronado
- Final ruler: Andrés Pastrana Arango
- Titles: List: President of Colombia; Secretary-General of the Non-Aligned Movement; Ambassador of Colombia to the United States; Mayor of Bogotá; Senator of Colombia; Minister of Government of Colombia; Minister of Finance and Public Credit of Colombia; Minister of Public Works of Colombia; Minister of Development of Colombia; Councilman of Bogotá
- Connected families: Arango family Caicedo family Ospina family Lozano de Peralta family Valencia Family
- Traditions: Roman Catholicism

The Pastrana family is part of the Colombian aristocracy, with a strong legacy in journalism and political leadership in South America. Both Misael Pastrana Borrero and his son Andrés Pastrana Arango held the presidency of Colombia, beyond these two administrations, the family has been influential in national media, diplomacy, conservative political networks, and public life throughout the twentieth and twenty-first centuries. Their actual prominence has positioned the Pastranas as one of Colombia’s most recognized modern political dynasties in Colombia.

== See also ==
- List of presidents of Colombia
- Political families of the world
