= New Granada =

New Granada may refer to various former national denominations for the present-day country of Colombia:

- New Kingdom of Granada, from 1538 to 1717
- Viceroyalty of New Granada, from 1717 to 1810, re-established from 1816 to 1822
- United Provinces of New Granada, from 1810 to 1816
- Republic of New Granada, from 1830 to 1858
- Granadine Confederation, from 1858 to 1863

New Granada may also refer to:

- Nueva Granada, Magdalena, Colombia
- Nueva Granada, El Salvador
- Nova Granada, São Paulo, Brazil
- New Granada Military University, Colombia
- Colegio Nueva Granada, Colombia
