= Mosquera family =

Mosquera
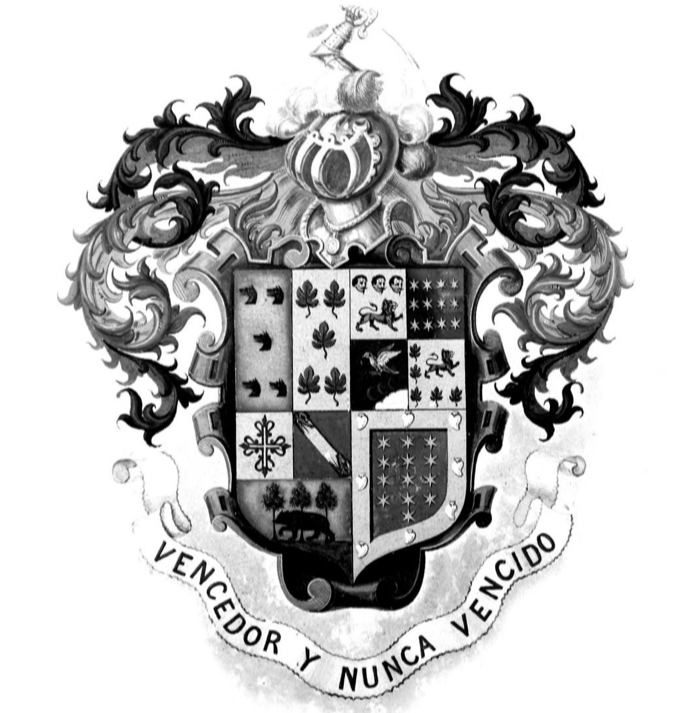
- Coat of arms of the Mosquera family, as reproduced in El gran general: Más allá del poder y la gloria, combining the arms of the Mosquera y Figueroa, Arboleda Salazar, Prieto de Tovar, Vergara, Silva, Hurtado de Mendoza, and Urrutia y Guzmán lineages.

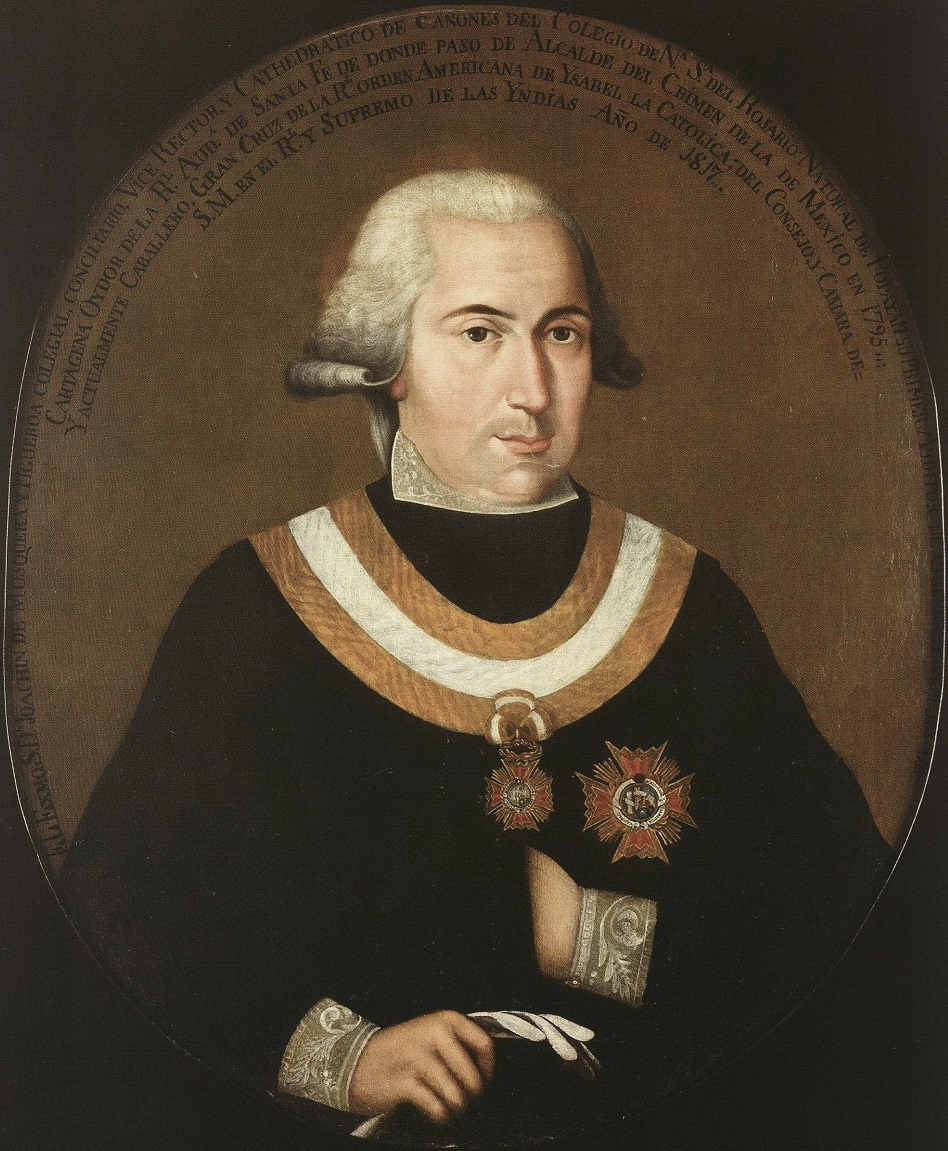
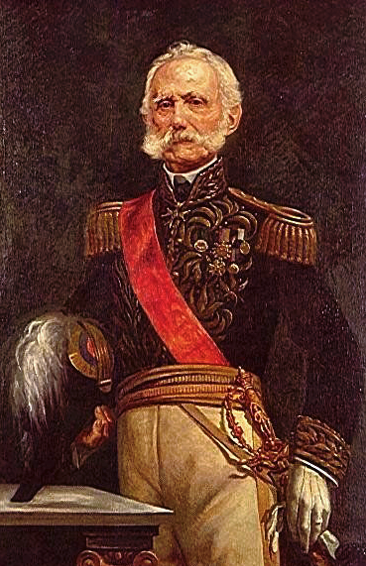
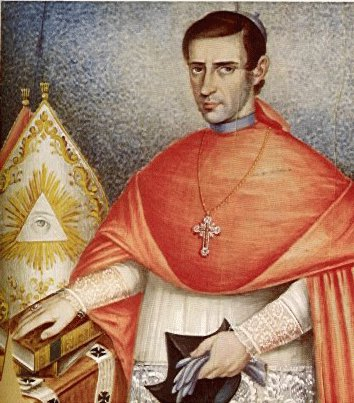
- Joaquín Mosquera Figueroa Tomás Cipriano de Mosquera Manuel José Mosquera
- Current region: Colombia, Spain, United States
- Earlier spellings: Moscón (in Extremaduran)
- Origin: Badajoz, Spain
- Founded: 16th century
- Founder: Cristóbal de Mosquera y Figueroa
- Final ruler: Víctor Mosquera Chaux
- Titles: List: Regent of Spain (President of the Regency of the Kingdom of Spain); President of the Supreme Central Junta of Spain; President of Gran Colombia; President of the Republic of New Granada; President of the Grenadine Confederation; President of the United States of Colombia; Acting President of Colombia (Presidential Designate, 1981); Vicepresident of New Granada; Archbishop of Bogotá; Secretary of War and Navy of New Granada; Secretary of the Interior and Foreign Affairs of New Granada; President of the Senate of Colombia; Ambassador of Colombia to the United States; Ambassador of Colombia to the United Kingdom; Grand General of the United States of Colombia (unique title); Libertador
- Connected families: Arboleda family Epalza family Figueroa family Salazar family Valencia family Vergara family
- Traditions: Roman Catholic Church
- Motto: Victorious and never defeated

The Mosquera Family is a prominent colombian aristocratic and political family, originated in Badajoz, Extremadura, Spain.Throughout the 18th and 19th centuries its members played a major role in the political, economic, religious and social life of New Granada and later Colombia specially in the Cauca region and Popayán, in what is today southwestern Colombia.

Three of its most prominent members, Joaquín de Mosquera Figueroa y Arboleda Vergara, who served as Regent of Spain in 1812, Joaquín Mosquera and Tomás Cipriano de Mosquera, served as presidents of Colombia (or its predecessor states), and numerous relatives were influential politicians, soldiers, diplomats, ecclesiastics and businessmen. Simón Bolívar named José María Mosquera as 'the first citizen of America' and his family, as the favorite family of The Liberator in all of Gran Colombia.

== History ==
All descendants from Cristóbal de Mosquera y Figueroa, considered the first Mosquera to settle permanently in the New Kingdom of Granada. Born in Badajoz, Extremadura, in the 16th century, he was one of the sons of a knight commander of the Order of Santiago,. Several of his brothers took part in the conquest of Florida and Central America and for that reason they first went to Florida but ended moving back to Peru where he received an encomienda.

By the early 19th century, the family were one of the richest and most powerful families of New Granada. They had gold mines and a considerable number of slaved people who served at their hacienda in Cauca. They made ties with consolidated families and aristocratic houses of the New Kingdom of Granada, especially the Arboleda Family, Valencia Family and Vergara Family. Also other lineages with some importance, such as the Rodríguez Gil of Popayán. One of them, Joaquín de Mosquera was a jurist and statesman who first served in Bogotá and later as regent of Spain, effectively acting as head of state of the Spanish monarchy in 1812, he was made a knight of the order of Isabella the Catholic for his services to the crown.

=== Independence and Gran Colombia ===
From the independence period through the mid-nineteenth century, members of the family occupied some of the highest offices in the Spanish monarchy and in the emerging Colombian state. During the wars of independence against Spain and the formation of Gran Colombia, the Mosquera–Arboleda alliance became the most important regional pillar of support for Simón Bolívar. In exchange of their money, political and military capacities they sought to preserve their local power and favored them in Bogotá. Later many members held high positions in the institutions of Gran Colombia and its successor states.

Joaquín Mosquera y Arboleda became President of Gran Colombia in 1830 and his brother Tomás Cipriano de Mosquera held the presidency of New Granada, the Granadine Confederation and the United States of Colombia on several occasions, also received a unique title in the history of Colombia called Gran General. Other relatives served as ministers, senators, governors, judges, bishops and diplomats in Gran Colombia and its successor states, reinforcing the family’s reputation as a dynastic ruling house and after a while the family of General Tomás Cipriano Mosquera was popularly called the "Royal Family of Colombia" during the so-called Age of Caudillos (1830–1875).

In his testament, General Tomás Cipriano de Mosquera set out his full compound name — I,Tomás Cipriano Ignacio María de Mosquera-Figueroa y Arboleda-Salazar, Prieto de Tovar, Vergara, Silva, Hurtado de Mendoza, Urrutia y Guzmán — and claimed descent, through his father, from a “prince of Muscovy” and from the dukes of Feria and Alba, and through his mother from the same houses and from the Hurtado de Mendoza, grandes of Spain. — He stated that this lineage was supported by genealogical documents and by a letter from Empress Eugénie of France, presented as evidence of a common ancestor (Guzmán el Bueno).

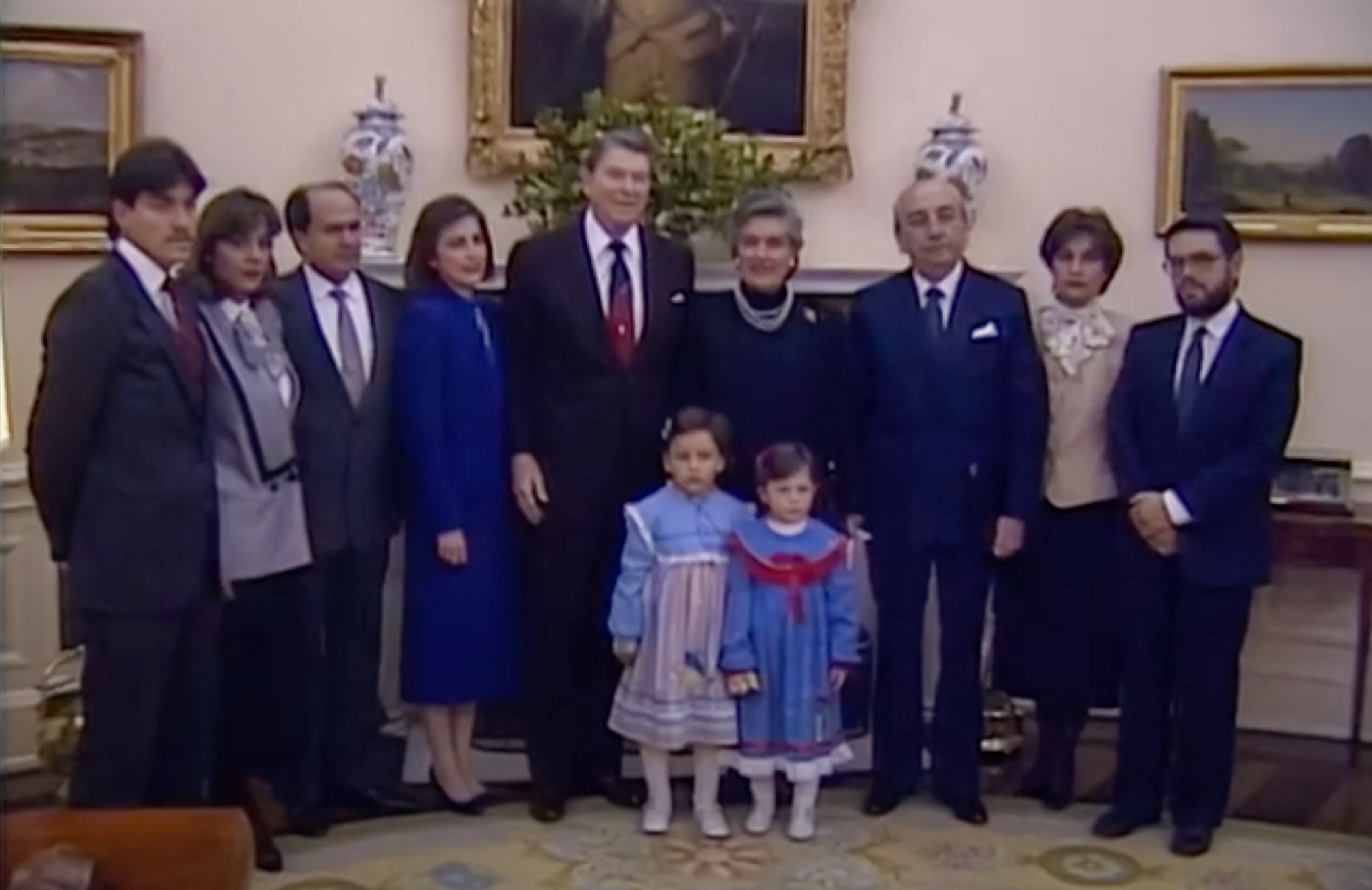
Ronald Reagan with the Mosquera Chaux family at The White House, Washington D.C. 1987

Víctor Manuel Mosquera Chaux was one of the most prominent twentieth-century political figures of the Mosquera family, he was a lawyer, journalist, and statesman, held several high-ranking offices in the Colombian government, including Colombia ambassador to the United States and became twice Presidential Designate, serving briefly as Acting President of Colombia in February 1981.

== Toponymy ==
- Mosquera, Cundinamarca
- Mosquera, Nariño
- Mosquera Surname
