= List of political families in Colombia =

Many families in Colombia's history have produced multiple generations of political figures who have exercised important influence over government and public policy at the local, regional, and national levels, from the First families of Colombia to recognized families who often demonstrated notable institutional continuity across different political eras.

Some of these families originated during the Spanish colonial period, forming part of the colonial aristocracy through imperial service in the Kingdom of New Granada. They descended from Spanish founders, including conquistadors, nobility, and important figures from early settlers who held high-ranking positions, such as president, oidores, governors, mayors, treasury officials, military officers, and ecclesiastical authorities. During the Viceroyalty of New Granada, this and other families consolidated their influence through long-standing bureaucratic and administrative service, creating the first political dynasties of the country, called libertadores who later sought Independence. In the republican period, during Gran Colombia and the Republic of New Granada, many of these lineages lost influence to new caudillos; these new families today came to be described as oligarchic families due to their enduring political and economic dominance during the era of caudillos (1830-1875). Additionally, recent Colombia has seen the emergence of regional political clans, historically concentrated in specific departments and provinces, characterized by strong electoral machinery and patronage networks.

== A ==
Abadía – Republican political family; President Miguel Abadía Méndez (1926–1930).

Acosta – Spanish viceroyalty bureaucratic lineage; legal and administrative continuity.

Acevedo – Late viceroyalty and independence-era intellectual and political family.

Agar – Spanish viceroyalty aristocracy; late 18th-century Santafé elite.

Alcántara – Republican military and political figures, nineteenth century.

Álvarez – Spanish viceroyalty administrators; republican continuity.

Álvarez Pino – Late viceroyalty ruling family; Santafé urban elite.

Angulo – Modern economic-political elite; contemporary national influence.

Andrade – Spanish viceroyalty elite; later republican political presence.

Arboleda – Founding aristocracy; independence leaders; long Conservative dynasty.

Arce – Spanish viceroyalty administrative family; Santafé.

Arrubia – Regional political family; republican period.

Auza – Spanish viceroyalty elite; late 18th-century Santafé.

Ayala – Independence-era military and republican political figures.

Ayerbe – Regional political family

Azuero – Independence leadership; early republican founding family.

Azuola – Spanish viceroyalty elite, descendants of the Declaration of Independence.

== B ==
Baraya – Independence military leadership; republican transition.

Barco – Liberal political dynasty; President Virgilio Barco Vargas.

Barragán – Spanish viceroyalty military-administrative lineage.

Betancur – Republican Conservative family; President Belisario Betancur.

Blaya – Late viceroyalty Santafé elite family.

Brigard – 20th-century elite

Bolívar – Regional Venezuelan family; independence leadership, Simón Bolívar lineage.

Burgos – Spanish viceroyalty urban aristocracy.

== C ==
Cabal – Spanish viceroyalty rural military elite, José María Cabal lineage.

Caicedo / Caycedo – Founding aristocracy; independence and early republican presidents. Two presidents, Felipe Vergara Caicedo and Domingo Caicedo

Calderón – Republican legal and political family.

Calvo – Republican Conservative intellectual and political lineage.

Camacho – Long-standing military, bureaucratic and political family.

Campo – Regional republican political elites.

Caro – Conservative intellectual dynasty; President Miguel Antonio Caro.

Castillo – Republican military, judicial, and political service.

Castro – Spanish viceroyalty administrators; republican politicians.

Char – Contemporary regional political-economic clan of the Caribbean coast.

Concha – Conservative elite; President José Vicente Concha.

Cuervo – Spanish viceroyalty aristocracy; clergy and scholars.

== D ==
Díaz Quijano – Spanish viceroyalty Santafé elite family.

De Greiff – Bogotá elite.

Domínguez de Tejada – Spanish viceroyalty bureaucratic aristocracy.

Duque – Contemporary political family; President Iván Duque Márquez.

Duquesne – Spanish viceroyalty clergy and Enlightenment scholars.

== E ==
Echandía – Liberal republican dynasty; President Darío Echandía.

Eraso Mendigaña – Spanish viceroyalty landed elite; Santafé.

Escallón – Spanish viceroyalty aristocracy; republican continuity.

== F ==
Fernández – Broad republican political and legal lineage.

Fernández de Madrid – Founding aristocracy; independence leadership.

Fernández Insinillas – Spanish viceroyalty administrative elite.

Flórez – Spanish viceroyalty genealogical elite families.

== G ==
Gamba – Spanish viceroyalty and republican administrators.

Galavís – Late viceroyalty of New Granada aristocracy, 19th-century Santafé elite.

Galeano – Descendants of Spanish conquistador Martín Galeano.

Galán – Family and sons of Luis Carlos Galán Sarmiento.

Galindo – Spanish viceroyalty bureaucratic lineage.

García de Tejada – Spanish viceroyalty bureaucratic aristocracy.

Gaviria – 21st-century Liberal political dynasty; President César Gaviria Trujillo.

Gnecco – Regional political clan; Caribbean departments.

Gómez / González – 20th-century conservative elite; President Laureano Gómez Castro.

González Manrique – Spanish Viceroyalty of New Granada nobility and presidents of the Real Audiencia.

Groot – Spanish viceroyalty aristocracy; Former president, historians and intellectuals.

Gutiérrez – Spanish viceroyalty elite.

Gutiérrez Cacho – Spanish viceroyalty elite lineage.

== H ==
Herrán – 19th century political family; one president Pedro Alcántara Herrán.

Herrera Sotomayor – Spanish viceroyalty ruling family; Santafé.

Herrera Vergara – Aristocratic branch; political-social continuity.

Holguín – Conservative aristocracy; Two Presidents, Carlos Holguín Mallarino and Jorge Holguín Mallarino.

Hurtado – Spanish viceroyalty and republican service lineage.

== L ==
Lago – Spanish viceroyalty Santafé elite.

Largacha – Conservative republican elites; nineteenth century.

Lastra – Late viceroyalty urban elite.

León – Spanish viceroyalty administrative family.

Liévano – Liberal intellectuals, diplomats, and ministers.

Lleras – Liberal dynasty; Presidents Alberto Lleras Camargo and Carlos Lleras Restrepo.

Lloreda – Conservative political and diplomatic family.

López – Liberal dynasty; Presidents Alfonso López Michelsen. and Alfonso López Pumarejo.

Lozano – Early republican elites.

Lozano de Peralta – Founding nobility, principal Spanish viceroyalty aristocracy of New Granada, many of their descendants acted as presidents of Colombia in different eras.Jorge Migue Lozano de Peralta and Jorge Tadeo Lozano lineage.

== M ==
Mallarino – Conservative dynasty; Three Presidents, Carlos Holguín Mallarino, Jorge Holguín Mallarino and Manuel Murillo Toro (maternal line).

Manzaneque – Spanish viceroyalty Santafé elite.

Márquez – Republican military and political figures.

Marroquín – Conservative presidency; Manuel Antonio Marroquín.

Mejía – Regional and national political family.

Melo – Republican military leadership; nineteenth century.

Mendoza – Spanish viceroyalty bureaucratic elite.

Michelsen – Liberal dynasty; President Alfonso López Michelsen.

Montalvo – Regional republican political elites.

Morales – Spanish viceroyalty Santafé elite.

Mosquera – Regional elite,19th-century political dynasty, was popularly called the "Royal Family of Colombia" during the so-called Age of Caudillos (1830–1875); two presidents, Tomás Cipriano de Mosquera and Joaquín Mosquera.

Moya – Spanish viceroyalty administrative family.

Mújica – Spanish viceroyalty elite lineage.

Murillo – Republican political family.

== N ==
Nariño – Independence founding family; President Antonio Nariño.

Nieto – Conservative presidency; Manuel Murillo Toro lineage.

Núñez – Regeneration leader; President Rafael Núñez.

== O ==
Obaldía – Conservative political dynasty; republican presidents.

Obando – Independence military leaders and president; President José María Obando.

Olano – Spanish viceroyalty Santafé elite.

Olaya – 20-century liberal dynasty; President Enrique Olaya Herrera.

Olea – Spanish viceroyalty administrative lineage.

Ospina – 19th and 20th-century conservative dynasty; Twp presidents Mariano Ospina Rodríguez, Mariano Ospina Pérez.

Ortega – Spanish viceroyalty aristocracy; republican continuity.

Ortiz Bernal – Spanish viceroyalty elite family.

Otálora – Republican legal and political elites.

== P ==
Parra – Conservative presidency; Aquileo Parra.

París – Independence heroes and republican military elites.

Pastrana – Spanish Viceroyalty elite, conservative dynasty; two Presidents Misael Pastrana and Andrés Pastrana.

Payán – Independence and republican military leadership.

Pérez – Republican political participation across regions.

Petro – Contemporary left-wing political family; President Gustavo Petro.

Pey – Spanish viceroyalty aristocracy; known for the first president of Colombia José Miguel Pey.

Prieto – Spanish viceroyalty Santafé elite.

Pombo – Republican elite from Bogotá.

Pumarejo – Liberal reformist dynasty; President Alfonso López Pumarejo.

== Q ==
Quintero – Regional political elites.

== R ==
Reyes / Reyes Patria – Military influence, independence military heroes and one president; Rafael Reyes.

Riascos – Regional republican political family.

Ricaurte – Founding aristocracy; independence military heroes.

Rigueiros – Spanish viceroyalty elite lineage.

Rivas – Spanish viceroyalty Santafé elite.

Rojas – Military dictatorship; President Gustavo Rojas Pinilla.

Rodríguez Sotomayor – Spanish viceroyalty aristocracy.

Romana – Spanish viceroyalty elite family.

== S ==
Salda / Saldaña – Regional republican political family.

Salgar – Liberal presidency; Eustorgio Salgar.

Samper – 19th-century intellectual dynasty; President Ernesto Samper.

Sandino – Spanish viceroyalty Santafé elite.

Sanclemente – Conservative presidency; Manuel Antonio Sanclemente.

Santos – 20th-century liberal dynasty; two presidents, Eduardo Santos and Juan Manuel Santos.

Santacruz – Spanish viceroyalty regional elite family.

Santamaría / Sanz de Santamaría – Founding Aristocracy, Spanish Viceroyalty elite; independence military heroes.

Santander – Regional elite, 19th-century dynasty; Independence military heroe, president Francisco de Paula Santander.

Santodomingo – Spanish viceroyalty elite from bogotá, now a business dynasty.

Serrano – Regional political and military elites.

Serna – Spanish viceroyalty elite lineage.

Suárez – 20th-century conservative presidency; Marco Fidel Suárez.

== T ==
Tenorio – Spanish viceroyalty Santafé elite. Family of Independence heroes and one signer of the Declaration of Independence.

Torres – Independence intellectuals; early republic leaders.

Torrijos – Spanish viceroyalty administrative family.

Tovar Buendía – Spanish viceroyalty aristocracy; one of the founding lineage of Colombia.

Turbay – 20th-century liberal dynasty; President Julio César Turbay Ayala.

== U ==
Ugarte – Spanish viceroyalty elite lineage.

Urdaneta – Military leadership. One president, President Rafael Urdaneta.

Uricochea / Uricoechea – Scholars and republican elites.

Urizarri – Spanish viceroyalty elite family.

Urquinaona – Spanish viceroyalty Santafé aristocracy.

Urrutia – Diplomatic and economic republican elites.

== V ==
Valencia – Aristocracy and nobility, 20th-century conservative dynasty; President Guillermo León Valencia.

Valenzuela – Spanish viceroyalty and republican service.

Vélez de Guevara – Spanish viceroyalty aristocracy.

Venegas – Spanish viceroyalty administrative lineage.

Vergara / Vergara-Azcárate – Founding aristocracy, 18th and 19th-century political dynasty; colonial, viceroyalty and republic elite. independence heroes. Four presidents, Luis Ayala Vergara, Felipe Vergara Azcárate, Estanislao Vergara and Ignacio Gutiérrez Vergara.

Villavicencio – Spanish viceroyalty administrators; early republic.

== Z ==
Zalamea – Liberal intellectual and political family.

Zailorda – Spanish viceroyalty Santafé elite.

Zornoza – Spanish viceroyalty elite lineage.

Zubia – Spanish viceroyalty aristocracy.

=== Clans, corruption and clientelism ===
It is of great importance to distinguish between historical and recognized political families, whose influence developed through long-term service within state institutions and democratic systems over multiple generations, from clans; family-based projects explicitly organized to commit crimes or to capture or co-opt the state, which operate through clientelism, illicit mechanisms, or political nepotism linked to narcotrafic, parapolitics, electoral machines and guerrilla or armed organizations who used violence, corruption and coercion to have population control. Making these distinctions is essential for accurately understanding the structure and evolution of political power in Colombia.

Aguilar clan – political power through corruption and extreme violence.

Besaile clan – Clientelism and ties to Gerlein Clan and Aida Merlano, convicted in 2019 for electoral crimes such as vote buying and conspiracy.

Char clan – Business family with political machine and strong clientelist networks with strong judicial evidence of electoral corruption involving senior family members like Arturo Char, criminal accusations linked to Aida Melano, convicted in 2019 for electoral crimes such as vote buying and conspiracy.

Escobar Gavíria clan – Part of the Medellín Cartel, family of druglord Pablo Escobar Gaviria.

Gerlein clan – Oldest political "clan" in the Colombian Caribbean region, known for inventing a clientelist model that combined politics, powerful contracting networks, and family businesses.

Gnneco clan – crime-linked network controlling a great part of the political system of Cesar, Colombia.

Jattin clan – Contemporary regional political clan in the Caribbean coast.

Rodríguez Orejuela clan – Part of the Cali Cartel, Family of the druglords Rodríguez Orejuela Brothers.

Pizarro clan – Political power through M-19 extreme violence including massacres and peace agreements, family of insurgents Carlos Pizarro Leóngómez and Hernando Pizarro Leóngómez.

== See also ==
- First family of Colombia
- List of political families
- List of presidents of Colombia

== Bibliography ==
- Flórez de Ocáriz, Juan. Genealogies of the New Kingdom of Granada, Volumes I–II. Madrid, 1674–1676.
- Silva, R. (2008). Gente decente: La élite rectora de la capital, 1797–1803 (pp. 95–132, esp. Table 9). Bogotá, Colombia: ICANH.
- Twinam, Ann. Public Lives, Private Secrets: Gender, Honor, Sexuality, and Illegitimacy in Colonial Spanish America. Stanford: Stanford University Press, 1999.
- Lockhart, James, and Stuart B. Schwartz. Early Latin America: A History of Colonial Spanish America and Brazil. Cambridge: Cambridge University Press, 1983.
- Kuethe, Allan J., and Kenneth J. Andrien. The Spanish Atlantic World in the Eighteenth Century. Cambridge: Cambridge University Press, 2014.
