= First family of Colombia =

Family of the president of Colombia

Colombian President Abelardo de la Espriella

The first family of Colombia is the family of the president of Colombia, who is both head of state and head of government of the Colombia. Members of the first family consist of the president, the first lady of Colombia, and any of their children. However, other close relatives of the president and first spouse, such as parents, grandchildren, stepchildren, and in-laws, may be classified as members of the first family if they reside in the Executive Residence of the Casa de Nariño Complex.

The current first family is the family of the 36th president of Colombia, Abelardo de la Espriella since 2026.

President De la Espriella with his family

In Colombia, the term "first family" or "presidential family," informally referring to the president's immediate family, is most frequently used in the media. Individually, each member of the first family is assigned to a group within the National Intelligence Directorate, who then assign each member a code name. Used by special agents, these code names uniquely identify members of the first family for their ongoing protection, as well as for reasons of brevity, clarity, and tradition.

== List ==
1. Pey Family
2. Lozano de Peralta family
3. Nariño Family
4. Groot Family
5. Castro Family
6. Ayala Family
7. Arrubia Family
8. Gamba Family
9. Vergara family
10. Torres Family
11. Álvarez family
12. Restrepo Family
13. Fernández Family
14. Camacho Family
15. Castillo Family
16. García Family
17. Valenzuela Family
18. Villavicencio Family
19. Mejía Family
20. Serrano Family
21. Bolivar Family
22. Santander Family
23. Caycedo Family
24. Mosquera family
25. Urdaneta Family
26. Obando Family
27. Márquez Family
28. Alcántara Family
29. López Family
30. Melo Family
31. Herrera Family
32. Obaldía Family
33. Mallarino Family
34. Ospina Family
35. Calvo Family
36. Nieto Family
37. Largacha Family
38. Santos family
39. Uricoechea Family
40. Murillo Family
41. Rojas Family
42. Riascos Family
43. Acosta Family
44. Gutiérrez Family
45. Salgar Family
46. Pérez Family
47. Parra Family
48. Núnez Family
49. Salda Family
50. Calderón Family
51. Otálora Family
52. Hurtado Family
53. Campo Family
54. Payán Family
55. Holguín family
56. Caro Family
57. Cuervo Family
58. Quintero Family
59. Sanclemente Family
60. Marroquín Family
61. Reyes Family
62. Angulo Family
63. Gónzalez Family
64. Restrepo Family
65. Concha Family
66. Suárez Family
67. Abadía Family
68. Olaya Family
69. Echandía Family
70. Lleras Family
71. Valencia Family
72. Montalvo Family
73. Pastrana Family
74. Azuero Family
75. Liévano Family
76. Turbay Family
77. Betancur Family
78. Barco Family
79. Gaviria Family
80. Samper Family
81. Uribe Family
82. Duque Family
83. Petro Family
84. De la Espriella Family (Present)

== Relations ==
Throughout history, Colombia has had more than 120 heads of state, including presidents, presidential appointees, military leaders, ministers with presidential functions, and politicians who have held the vacant position, throughout more than 200 years of history, since 1810 up to the present.

The South American country is one of the few countries in the world that, without being a monarchy, has been governed by people related to each other, either by maternal, paternal or mixed lines. There are also kinships by affinity thanks to multiple marriages between these families, so that power has come to be concentrated in a handful of families. Some considered bureaucratic dynasties, others political clans and more commonly known presidential families or first family. The use of the term "first family" to refer to the family of the President of Colombia only came into widespread use in North America during the Kennedy administration in the United States.

a compilation of those relationships, not just between presidents, but also between first ladies and presidents. The order of appearance of the families responds to a strictly alphabetical order.

== Álvarez Family ==
Descendants of Spaniards that served as colonial royal officers during the 16th. Later family of Colonial Lawyers that became creole elite and got to the highest bureaucratic ranks during the 17th and 18th century, its members had exceptional bureaucratic careers and the family created a bureaucratic dynasty (1730s–1810s). Dismantled after the Bourbon Reforms.

presidents

- Antonio Nariño y Álvarez (1765–1823) He was president of Colombia between 1813 and 1815, although he had to leave office several times throughout that period. He drafted the Spanish version of the Declaration of the Rights of Man and of the Citizen of the French Revolution.
- Manuel de Bernardo Álvarez del Casal (1743–1816) was president of Colombia between 1813 and 1814, replacing his maternal nephew Antonio Nariño.

External lineː Ricaurte-Nariño

- Trinidad Ricaurte Nariño was the niece of Antonio Nariño y Álvarez, and was the mother of José Manuel Marroquín Ricaurte (1827–1908), who was president of Colombia from 1900 to 1904.

External lineː Ricaurte-Lozano de Peralta

- Jorge Tadeo Lozano (1781–1816) was president of Colombia in 1811 representing the deposed king of Spain Fernando VII. He was the son of the Marquis of San Jorge, Jorge Miguel Lozano, who was the grandfather of Antonio Ricaurte Lozano, a relative of Trinidad Ricaurte Nariño.

External lineː Olaya-Ricarte

- Emeterio Olaya Ricaurte was the maternal great-grandson of the Marquis of San Jorge, Jorge Miguel Lozano, and married Empress Herrera Medina. The couple had Enrique Olaya Herrera (1880–1937), the first liberal president after half a decade of conservative hegemony, holding power from 1930 to 1934 for liberalism.

External lineː Olaya-Londoño

- Enrique Olaya Herrera married María Teresa Londoño Sáenz, who was the daughter of descendants of Antonio Ricaurte.

== Arango Family ==
The Arangos are pioneers in the conquest and colonization of American territories, being one of the oldest families in present-day Colombia. Its members came from the Asturian nobility, and had Italian ancestors. The family currently has an important presence in Antioquia, especially in Medellín. The most influential political branch settled in Bogotá, coming from Cartagena, with the lawyer from Cartagena from an Antioquian family, Carmelo Arango.

President

- Andrés Pastrana Arango President of Colombia between 1998 and 2002.

Presidential candidate

Carlos Arango Vélez (1879–1974): Lawyer and politician of the Liberal Party, of which he was a promoter of the most radical wing, close to communism; in fact he was co-founder of the radical leftist movement close to communism called Unirismo with Jorge Eliecer Gaitán. Candidate for the presidency in 1942, losing to Alfonso López Pumarejo.

First lady

- María Cristina Arango Vega (de Pastrana) (1928–2017): First Lady between 1970 and 1974 by her marriage to the lawyer Misael Pastrana, and mother of Andrés Pastrana Arango. She was the daughter of Carlos Arango and a descendant of Domingo Caycedo through his mother's line.

== Arboleda Family ==
The Arboledas are originally from the city of Popayán, which had its period of greatest influence between the 17th and 20th centuries. It has its origins in the Arboleya region in Asturias, Spain.

President

- Joaquín Mariano Mosquera y Arboleda
- Tomás Cipriano de Mosquera y Arboleda
- Julio Arboleda Pombo O'Donnell (1817–1862). He ruled between June 10 and July 18, 1861, being overthrown by his relative Tomás Cipriano de Mosquera. Although he should have taken office on April 1, his position was temporarily held by the country's attorney general Bartolomé Calvo Díaz (1815–1889).

First Lady

- Mariana Benvenuta Arboleda y Arroyo.

Unionː Arboleda-Pombo

- José Rafael Arboleda y Arroyo (1795–1831), married Matilde Josefa Pombo O'Donnell (1799-?)24, who was the daughter of the Spanish-Irish noblewoman María Beatriz Isabel O'Donnell Annethant (1755–1833); and cousin of the Spanish-Irish nobleman Leopoldo O'Donnell (1809–1867). The Arboleda and Pombo O'Donnell couple had President Julio Arboleda.

== Calderón Family ==
President

- Juan Manuel Santos Calderon

Unionː Santos-Calderón

- Enrique Santos Castillo, nephew of Eduardo Santos, married Clemencia Calderón Nieto, niece of Clímaco Calderón Nieto, with whom he had Juan Manuel Santos Calderón.

Vice president

- Francisco Santos Calderon

presidential appointees

- Climaco Calderón Reyes (1852–1913). As attorney general, he held office temporarily from December 21 to 22, 1882, with the sudden death of the incumbent Francisco Javier Zaldúa.
- Guillermo Quintero Calderon (1832–1919). Hero of the civil war of 1884, he was nicknamed the Hero of the Smoke. He exercised the presidency as designated in 1895, replacing the incumbent Miguel Antonio Caro.

Unionː Calderón-Pérez

- Clímaco Calderón married Amelia Pérez Triana, daughter of the liberal politician and former president of Colombia, Santiago Pérez Manosalva.

== Caicedo Family ==
President

- Domingo Caycedo y Sanz de Santamaría
- Felipe de Vergara Azcárate y Caycedo

== Gomez Family ==
President

- Laureano Gómez (1889–1965). He was elected president in 1949 for the Conservative Party. He was in charge until 1951, when he had to resign due to health problems. When he wanted to resume he was victim of a coup plotted within his party. He was the father of Álvaro and grandfather of Enrique Gómez.

Presidential candidates

- Álvaro Gómez Hurtado (1919–1995). He ran 3 times as a presidential candidate. The first in 1974 and the second in 1986, by the Conservative Party. In 1990 he presented his candidacy for the National Salvation Movement (MSN). He failed to win in any of the elections but always came in second.
- Enrique Gomez Martinez. Presidential candidate for the 2022 elections by MSN.

Unionsː Gomez-Hurtado

- Laureano Gómez married María Hurtado Cajiao, from the Hurtado de Popayán family. María Hurtado was related to Ezequiel Hurtado Hurtado.

== Holguín Family ==
The Holguín have their center of power in the city of Cali, department of Valle del Cauca. It has its origins in Spain, and the most distant ancestor of the Holguín in Colombia was Nicolás Martín Holguín, comrade-in-arms of Sebastián de Belarcázar, founder from the city of Popayan.

presidents

- Carlos Holguin Mallarino (1832–1894). He was elected president for the conservatism for the period 1888–1892. He was the older brother of Jorge Holguín.
- Jorge Marcelo Holguin Mallarino (1848–1928). He was appointed president to complete the term of Rafael Reyes in 1909 after his resignation, but was removed by Congress in August. He was then appointed to complete the term of Marco Fidel Suárez, who also resigned, this time in 1921.

Presidential candidate

The mathematician and former mayor of Medellín, Sergio Fajardo, is a presidential candidate for the Compromiso Ciudadano party for the 2022 elections. He is partner of the diplomat María Ángela Holguín Cuellar, great-granddaughter of Jorge Holguín, and his wife Cecilia Arboleda, a her turn daughter of Julio Arboleda.

First Lady

- Carolina Ortiz Holguín spouse of Floilán Largacha.

Unionː Holguín-Caro

- Carlos Holguín Mallarino married Margarita Caro Tobar, daughter of the co-founder of the conservatism José Eusbio Caro, and sister of Miguel Antonio Caro Tobar (1843–1909), who held the presidency from 1894 to 1898. Caro created the 1886 constitution together with Rafael Nunez Moledo.

Unionː Holguín-Mallarino

- Manuel María Ramón Mallarino Ibargüen (1808–1872), was the first president for the Conservative Party, occupying the position between 1855 and 1857. His sister María Josefa Mallarino Ibargüen married Vicente Holguín Sánchez, from whom Carlos and Jorge Holguín descend Mallarino.

== Hurtado Family ==
presidents

- Ezequiel Hurtado Hurtado (1825–1890). He held the presidency from April 1 to August 10, 1884, replacing Rafael Núñez, who was out of Bogotá.
- Eliseo Payan Hurtado (1825–1895). As Núñez's vice president, he held office from January 7 to June 4, 1887. His mother was related to Ezequiel Hurtado.
- Froilan Largacha Hurtado

Presidential candidate

- Alvaro Gomez Hurtado

== López family ==
presidents

- Alfonso López Pumarejo (1886–1959)
- Alfonso López Michelsen (1913–2007)

Presidential candidate

- Clara López (born 1950). Gustavo Petro's vice-presidential formula for the Alternative Democratic Pole in 2010, being defeated by Juan Manuel Santos. She is the great-niece of Alfonso López Pumarejo because she is the daughter of Álvaro López Holguín, her nephew.

Union Lopez-Holguin

The daughter of former President Jorge Holguín and Cecilia Arboleda, Cecilia Holguín, married Eduardo López Pumarejo, brother of former President Alfonso López Pumarejo. Cecilia and Eduardo's son was Álvaro López Holguín, father of Clara López.

Unionː López-Michelsen

The first lady from 1934 to 1938 and 1942–1945, María Michelsen Lombana (1890–1949), was the niece of the presidential candidate for liberalism in 1918, José María Lombana (1854–1928). María was the mother of Alfonso López Michelsen.

== Martínez de Zaldúa Family ==
presidents

- Pedro Alcantara Herrán y Martínez de Zaldúa (1800–1872): Military and politician. President of Colombia between 1841 and 1845. Son-in-law of Tomás Cipriano de Mosquera.
- Francisco Javier Zaldúa de Martínez (1811–1882): Colombian lawyer and politician. President of Colombia in 1882, dying in office, as a unique case in history; Due to his advanced age, it is believed that he was controlled by Rafael Núñez. Maternal cousin of Pedro Alcántara Herrán.

== Mosquera Family ==
The Mosqueras are originally from the city of Popayán, whose members had enormous relevance in the political and social life of Colombia during the 19th century, with origins in Badajoz, Spain. The family was one of the richest in Colombia at the beginning of its history, since it owned the gold deposits in Cauca, and they were the most important slaveholders in the country along with the Arboledas, a family they married. several of its members.

presidents

- Joaquín Mariano Mosquera y Arboleda (1787–1878)
- Tomás Cipriano de Mosquera y Arboleda (1789–1878)

presidential designee

- Victor Mosquera Chaux (1919–1997). He was appointed President of Julio César Turbay, replacing him between February 3 and 11, 1981.

First Lady

- Maria Josefa Mosquera y Hurtado spouse of Joaquín Mosquera.
- Amalia de Mosquera y Arboleda spouse of Pedro Alcántara Herrán.
- Sofia Mosquera y Hurtado spouse of Julio Arboleda.
- Elvira Cárdenas Mosquera spouse of José Vicente Concha.

Unionː Mosquera-Arboleda

- José María Mosquera y Figueroa (1752–1829), brother of Spanish nobleman Joaquín de Mosquera-Figueroa; He married María Manuela Arboleda y Arrachea (1753–1824) 26, who was the sister of the hero of Independence Antonio Arboleda y Arrachea (1770–1825). The Mosquera and Arboleda couple had presidents Joaquín and Tomás Cipriano.

External lineː Concha-Cárdenas

- José Vicente Concha Ferreria (1867–1929), who was conservative president between 1914 and 1918 and was in charge of leading the country during the First World War, remarried Elvira Cárdenas Mosquera, granddaughter of Tomás Cipriano de Mosquera along the line of the Mosquera's lover, Paula Rosalía Luque.

External lineː Olaya-Cárdenas

- María Olaya Londoño, daughter of Enrique Olaya and María Teresa Londoño, married Jorge Cárdenas Núñez, descendant of Tomás Cípriano de Mosquera through the line of Paula Luque.

== Largacha Family ==
The Largacha are of Basque origin; his last name in Basque is Largatxa.29 The Colombian branch has the city of Popayán as its center of power, and they had some influence in Colombia in the mid-nineteenth century, through the Colombian Liberal Party, in the hands of the Mosquera family, and then on his own through marriages with other renowned families.

presidents

- Froilán Largacha Hurtado (1823–1892). Member of a triumvirate appointed by Tomás Cipriano de Mosquera in 1863. Largacha was a defender of Mosquera, who adopted him as his pupil, to continue his political work.
- Julian Trujillo Largacha (1828–1883). He held the presidency from April 1, 1878, to April 1, 1880. He was Froilán's maternal nephew, from whom he distanced himself due to his closeness to the moderate liberal Rafael Núñez, who promoted his presidential campaign, after 3 failed attempts previous years.

presidential designee

- Diego Euclides de Angulo Lemos (1841–1917). He was appointed president in 1908 when incumbent Rafael Reyes took leave of office on military business. He was the son of Antonia Lemos Largacha, a relative of Froilán Largacha.

Unionː Largacha-Gómezː

- Carlos Largacha Ortiz, son of Froilán Largacha, married María Luisa Manrique Gómez, great-granddaughter of the Spanish politician Francisco González Manrique, who in turn was the grandfather of the polymath Jorge Tadeo Lozano (1871–1816), president of Colombia in 1811, during the emancipation of the territory from Spanish hands.

== Lleras Family ==
The Lleras are currently considered one of the most influential and powerful families in Colombia, being part of the group known as 'The Five Families of Colombia.' Its members descend from Catalan individuals, mainly from Barcelona and Girona, who settled in the country in the 18th century.30

The family's center of power is the Colombian capital.

presidents

- Alberto Lleras Camargo (1906–1990). Grandson of Professor Lorenzo María Lleras, close to Simón Bolívar. He was elected president after the resignation of Alfonso López Pumarejo, to complete the period from 1945 to 1946. Later he was elected president from 1958 to 1962 during the National Front. He married the Chilean Bertha Puga, daughter of the Chilean soldier Arturo Puga, who became president of his country in 1936 during a governance crisis.
- Carlos Alberto Lleras Restrepo (1908–1994). He was elected president by liberalism for the third period of the National Front. He was a second cousin of Alberto Lleras, since Carlos's father was Alberto's cousin.

Vice president

- German Vargas Lleras (born 1962). He was Vice President of Colombia for Juan Manuel Santos between 2014 and 2017, when he resigned for his 2018 presidential aspiration. He was the son of Germán Vargas Espinosa and his wife Clemencia Lleras de la Fuente, one of the daughters of Carlos Lleras with his wife, the Spanish Cecilia de la Fuente.

presidential candidate

- Carlos Lleras de la Fuente (born 1937) He was a presidential candidate for the MSN in the 1994 elections, although his candidacy never really took off, since he never really wanted to compete. He is the eldest son of Carlos Lleras and Cecilia de la Fuente.

Unionː Pérez-Lleras

- The writer Felipe Pérez Manosalva was married to Susana Lleras Triana, daughter of the influential educator and writer, Lorenzo María Lleras, and paternal aunt of Alberto Lleras Camargo. Felipe was the brother of the liberal politician Santiago Pérez Manosalva (1830–1900), president of Colombia between 1874 and 1876.

== Lozano de Peralta family ==
Aristocratic family of Spanish origins, traditional post colonial family of lawyers with important networks. Family of noble ancestry mark of superior status that held the titles of Marquis of San Jorge and honorary title Viscount of Pastrana. Traced back centuries to Spanish rule for having occupied high-ranking colonial positions. Members of the Church hierarchy and colonial state bureaucracy.

- José María Lozano de Peralta.
- Jorge Tadeo Lozano de Peralta

First Lady

- Maria Tadea Lozano e Isasi spouse of Jorge Tadeo Lozano de Peralta.
- Maria Teresa Lozano e Isasi spouse of Luis de Ayala y Vergara.
- Josefa Lozano y Manrique spouse of Manuel Bernardo Álvarez.

Union: Lozano de Peralta-Vergara-Caycedo

- Daughter of the Marquis of San Jorge and sister of Jorge Tadeo Lozano Married Juan Vergara Caycedo nephew of Felipe de Vergara y Caycedo.

== Ospina Family ==
The Ospinas, another of the great families of the Colombian aristocracy, have their origins in the Basque Country. Their most important sphere of influence was until the middle of the 20th century. Its members include important and wealthy Colombian coffee businessmen, a product that gave them wealth in the second half of the 19th century, and from which they benefited in the so-called Coffee Bonanza of the 1920s.

They are frequently accused by the extreme left as the quintessential oligarchs of the Conservative Party, since several of its notable members were active militants, including the party's founder himself, Mariano Ospina I. Their center of power was Medellín and they currently share it with Bogota.

presidents

- Mariano Ospina Rodriguez (Mariano Ospina I) (1805–1885). He was the co-founder of the Conservative Party together with the poet José Eusebio Caro. He was the second Colombian president of that party, from 1858 to 1861. He was overthrown in 1861 by the liberal insurrection of Tomás Cipriano de Mosquera.
- Pedro Nel Ospina Vásquez (1858–1927) Son of Mariano Ospina Rodríguez with his third wife, the wealthy heiress Enriqueta Vásquez Jaramillo. A prominent businessman and military man, he was president of Colombia between 1922 and 1926, a period that coincided with the coffee boom and the compensation for the loss of Panama.
- Luis Mariano Ospina Perez (Mariano Ospina II) (1891–1976). Son of the wise Tulio Ospina Vásquez and his wife Ana Rosa Clara Pérez Puerta; nephew of Pedro Nel Ospina and grandson of Mariano Ospina Pérez. A prominent coffee businessman, he held the presidency between 1946 and 1950, a period during which the Bogotazo was presented.

Unionː Pastrana-Nicholls

- Santiago Pastrana Puyana, eldest son of Andrés Pastrana Arango, married Sabrina Nicholls-Ospina, daughter of diplomat Ángela Mercedes Ospina, who in turn is the great-great-granddaughter of former President Mariano Ospina Rodríguez; She is the great-grandniece of former President Pedro Nel Ospina and granddaughter of former President Mariano Ospina Pérez.

== Pastrana Family ==
The Pastranas, a family with significant influence today in Colombia, come from the Pastrana region, in Guadalajara, Spain. There are stories that link them to the Creole nobility of the 18th century, through the Duchy of Pastrana.34

The family is powerful in Bogotá, but its center of power historically is the current department of Huila, the city of Neiva and the municipality of Gigante.

presidents

- Misael Pastrana Borrero (1923–1997). He held the presidency in the name of conservatism between 1970 and 1974, being the last president of the National Front.
- Andrés Pastrana Arango (born 1954) He was elected president in 1998 after the scandalous government of Ernesto Samper, whom he accused of illegally financing his 1994 presidential campaign. He is the son of Misael Pastrana.

== Restrepo Family ==
The Restrepos, a respectable family among the people of Antioquia, are of Asturian origin.353637 Powerful family clan from the mid-17th century and the following centuries, and for several decades of the 20th century whose center of power are the cities of Medellín, Rionegro and various towns in the department of Antioquia.

President

- Carlos Eugenio Restrepo Restrepo (1867–1937): Lawyer and successful businessman, he was a conservative with moderate and progressive ideas; he came to the presidency through the Unión Republicana coalition party.
- Carlos Alberto Lleras Restrepo

Unionː Lleras-Restrepo

- Federico Lleras Acosta (1877–1938), renowned scientist, married Amalia Restrepo Briceño, who was related by the bloodline of historian and writer José Félix de Restrepo to Pedro Antonio Restrepo Escobar, father of Carlos E. Restrepo. The Lleras Restrepo couple had Carlos Lleras Restrepo.

Unionː Camacho-Restrepo

- Salvador Camacho Roldán (1827–1900), who was president for liberalism between 1868 and 1869, married María del Carmen Tamayo Restrepo, maternal niece of José Félix de Restrepo.

== Rojas Family ==
President

- Gustavo Rojas Pinilla (1900–1975). He served as the de facto presidency from 1953 to 1957, when he led a coup against incumbent Laureano Gómez and took office on behalf of the progressive conservatives. He resigned after a social crisis. In 1966 he founded the ANAPO party, which almost brought him to the presidency for the second time in 1970.

presidential candidate

- María Eugenia Rojas Correa (born 1932) She was a candidate for ANAPO in the 1974 elections, being the first woman to try to be president of Colombia. She is the only daughter of Gustavo Rojas Pinilla and his wife Carolina Correa Londoño.

== Reyes family ==
President

- Rafael Reyes Prieto (1849–1921). Prominent businessman and military. He was Conservative president from August 7, 1904, to June 9, 1909, when he was forced to resign.

presidential designee

- Climaco Calderon Reyes. He was the second nephew of Rafael Reyes through the line of his mother Clotilde Reyes, Rafael's half-sister.

== Samper Family ==
The Sampers are one of the most powerful families in Colombia. They founded institutions, schools, companies and think tanks, and they have shares in soccer teams such as Independiente Santafe, and they are prominent members of the Colombian Liberal Party. The Samper family includes journalists, businessmen, liberal politicians, artists, etc.

The family comes from imperial France in the 11th century, whose members settled in Navarre and Aragon, from where they later embarked for America.

President

- Ernesto Samper Pizano (born 1950). He was elected president for the Liberal Party for the period 1994–1998. He is the great-great-grandson of Miguel Samper.

Presidential candidate

- Miguel Samper Agudelo (1825–1899). He was a candidate for liberalism in 1898, being defeated by Manuel Antonio Sanclemente.

== Santos Family ==
Los Santos are originally from the department of Santander, but based in Bogotá, which has significantly influenced the country's politics and journalism since the early 20th century. Among its members stands out the heroine of the independence of Colombia, Antonia Santos Plata.

presidents

- Eduardo Santos Montejo (1974) He married Lorenza Villegas Restrepo, sister of the journalist Alfonso Villegas Restrepo, founder of El Tiempo, a newspaper that Santos came to own since 1913. He was president of Colombia between 1938 and 1942 and he was responsible for leading the country during the Second World War. He died without leaving any descendants, since his only daughter died shortly after birth.
- Juan Manuel Santos (born 1951) He was president of Colombia from 2010 to 2018 and made the peace agreements with the FARC-EP that earned him the 2016 Nobel Peace Prize. Son of journalist Enrique Santos Castillo and his wife, Clemencia Calderón Nieto, and great-nephew of Eduardo Santos through the line of his brother, Enrique Santos Montejo.42

Vice president

- Francisco Santos Calderón (born 1961). Vice President of Álvaro Uribe from 2002 to 2010. He is the son of the journalist Hernando Santos Castillo and his wife Elena Calderón Nieta, and cousin of president Juan Manuel Santos.

Uniónː Ricaurte-Camachoː Juan Manuel Santos's maternal great-great-grandmother, Francisca Ricaurte Camacho, from whom the Calderón Nietos descend, was the great-niece of José Joaquín Camacho (1766–1816), president of Colombia between 1814 and 1815.42

== Sanz de Santamaría Family ==
President

- Estanislao Vergara y Sanz de Santamaría
- Domingo Caicedo y Sanz de Santamaría

First Lady

- Mariana Ortega Sanz de Santamaría spouse of Crisanto Valenzuela president of the United Provinces of New Granada, as a member of the Triumvirate of the United Provinces.

== Urdaneta family ==
The Urdanetas are originally from Guipúzcoa, Spain.

presidents

- Rafael Urdaneta Faría (1788–1845). A prestigious Venezuelan soldier, he was close to Simón Bolívar and assumed power to the detriment of Joaquín Mosquera and in the name of Simón Bolívar, in 1830.
- Roberto Urdaneta Arbelaez. (1890–1972). Son of the soldier Roberto Urdaneta Gómez and his wife Mercedes Arbeláez. He was designated presidential of Laureano Gómez, after his retirement due to his poor health. However, he ended up holding the position for almost two years. He was deposed by Gustavo Rojas Pinilla the same day that Gómez wanted to resume power. He was the great-great-grandson of the Uruguayan soldier Francisco Urdaneta, Rafael's cousin.

Unionː Holguin-Urdaneta

The daughter of Carlos Holguín and Margarita Caro, Clemencia Holguín Caro, married Roberto Urdaneta Arbelaéz.

== Valencia family ==
The Valencias have their business center and political and family activity in the city of Popayán in Cauca. The origins go back to the Italian nobility, passing through the Castilian kings Alfonso X el Sabio, his son, the infante Juan de Castilla, and his great-great-grandson Alfonso de Valencia, from whom the Colombian branch and surname come.43

President

- Guillermo León Valencia Muñoz (1909–1971), son of the poet Guillermo Valencia Castillo and his wife Josefina Muñoz. He governed between August 7, 1962, and August 7, 1966, for the Conservative Party, during the National Front.

Presidential candidates

- Guillermo Valencia Castillo (1873–1943), was a presidential candidate in 1918 for the Republican Union44 and in 1930 for a rebel sector of the Conservative Party4546. He did not win in either of the two elections.
- Paloma Valencia Laserna (born 1978), was a presidential candidate in 2021 for the internal consultation of the Centro Democrático party474849. The candidacy was won by Óscar Iván Zuluaga. She is the granddaughter of Guillermo León Valencia as the daughter of Ignacio Valencia López; and Mario Laserna Pinzón, as the daughter of Dorotea Laserna.

== Vergara-Azcárate family ==
Descendants of Navarrese nobility and important manors of the Basque Country, more specifically from the town of Bergara in the province of Guipúzcoa, Spain. One of the oldest family of Colombia, first family clans and bureaucratic dynasties of the late Spanish colonial era (1740s–1810s), gained influence and political power in the New Kingdom of Granada, viceroyalty of New Granada, later the United Provinces of New Granada after the independence from Spain, Gran Colombia, Republic of New Granada and culminated during the Granadine Confederation with its last ruler Ignacio Gutierrez Vergara.

President

- Luis de Ayala y Vergara (1812) held the presidency of Colombia, and exercised the executive power as State Councilor in 1812 due to the absence of President Antonio Nariño.
- Felipe de Vergara Azcarate y Caycedo (1812) He was principal member of the Government Junta appointed by General Antonio Nariño to govern Cundinamarca in his absence.
- Estanislao Vergara Azcárate y Sanz de Santamaría (1828–1830) He served as the 3rd president of Colombia during the absence of Simón Bolívar from December 28, 1828, to January 15, 1830.
- Ignacio Gutierrez Vergara (1861–1862) served as Designated President of Colombia in 1861, during the War of Sovereignties.
- Domingo Caycedo and Sanz de Santamaría served as President of Colombia a total of eleven times, the most terms any president has served to date.

Union: Vergara-Arboleda

- Francisca Vergara Azcárate y Dávila married José Patricio de Mosquera Figueroa, great-great-grandfather of Julio Arboleda Pombo.

Union: Vergara-Caicedo

- Felipe de Vergara Azcárate was uncle of Domingo Caycedo. Francisco Vergara Azcárate Vela y Sandoval, father of Felipe, married Petronila Caycedo ancestor of Domingo Caycedo.
- Domingo Caycedo is cousin of Estanislao Vergara their mothers were sisters.

Union Vergara-Mosquera

- Felipe de Vergara Azcárate and Estanislao Vergara are related to Tómas Cipriano Mosquera and Joaquín de Mosquera Figueroa, their grandmother was María Teresa de Arboleda Salazar y Vergara daughter of Francisca Vergara Azcárate married to José Patricio de Mosquera y Figueroa making them cousins. both descendants of Spanish Sergeant major Gabriel Gómez de Sandoval.
- The mother of Ignacio Gutierrez Vergara was cousin of Tómas Cipriano Mosquera.

Union: Vergara-Lozano de Peralta

- Juan de Vergara Azcárate, brother of Felipe de Vergara and uncle of Estanislao Vergara married Manuela Lozano de Peralta sister of Jorge Tadeo Lozano and José María Lozano de Peralta 2nd Marquis of San Jorge.
- Maria Teresa Lozano e Isasi was the spouse of Luis de Ayala y Vergara.

Union: Vergara-Sanz de Santamaría

Nicolás Sanz de Santamaría was great-grandfather of Domingo Caycedo, he is descendant of the colonial treasurer Antonio de Vergara Azcárate.

- Father of Estanislao Vergara was Francisco Xavier de Vergara Azcárate married to Francisca Sanz de Santamaria aunt of Domingo Caycedo y Sanz de Santamaría.

Union Vergara-Samper

The great-granduncle of Ernesto Samper, José María Samper Brush married Ana Saturia Vergara y Balcazar daughter of writer José María Vergara y Vergara who was cousin of Ignacio Gutierrez Vergara. Descendants of the brother of president Felipe de Vergara and uncle of the also president Estanislao Vergara.

== See also ==
- List of political families in Colombia
