= Merlano =

Merlano is a surname. Notable people with the surname include:

- Aída Merlano (born 1980), Colombian politician
- Brigitte Merlano (born 1982), Colombian hurdler
- Giorgio Merlano (born 1988), Italian footballer
