= El Cabrero =

Coordinates: 10.435017°N 75.537078°W

El Cabrero is a neighborhood of Cartagena de Indias (Colombia), in front of the Caribbean Sea, and in the other side, El Cabrero lagoon. On the southwest borders the walled Old City, specifically the defenses of San Lucas and Santa Catalina and the northeast, with the district of Marbella.

== History ==
The curious name of this neighborhood comes from the first centuries of the city, when there was here, a drove of goats that were reproduced copiously naming not only the neighborhood but also the geographical features of their environment as the lagoon, the mountain or swamp. This name appears in Cartagena de Indias planes in the 18th century.

At the entrance of the neighborhood was a small fortification called Revellín which was reached by a wooden bridge built over a wide ditch that communicated the sea waters with those of the swamp. When neighborhood grew, the Revellín was destroyed and was completely sealed the pit so now there is no trace of its presence.

Only since nineteenth century when ended naval attacks from the sea, city began to fill the space outside the walls and this district was one of the firsts because of its proximity and its coastal position. The big push to the definitive consolidation and beautification of neighborhood arrived in the late nineteenth century when lived here Rafael Núñez, twice president of the United States of Colombia and another twice, of the Colombian Republic. He lived here with his wife Soledad Román.

== Urban development ==
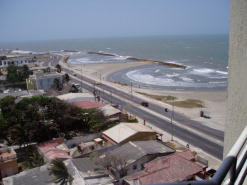
Vista del barrio desde el Edificio Altamar del Cabrero

It has traditionally been a neighborhood of individual houses inhabited by fishermen. Progressively they have been constructed apartment buildings with residential and tourism uses for its high altitude creates a strong contrast with traditional housing.

At sea have been installed seawalls like "T"; thanks to waves they have favored the formation of new semicircular beaches gaining ground to the sea.

Nowadays, the neighborhood has 3 streets:

- Avenida Santander: it runs all the coast line.
- Calle Real de El Cabrero: it is the central street in the neighborhood.
- Carrera 3ª also called "Soledad Román": it borders the lagoon by lands populated by mangroves. There is a cycling infrastructure along this street.

== Monuments and interesting points ==
=== House-museum Rafael Núñez ===
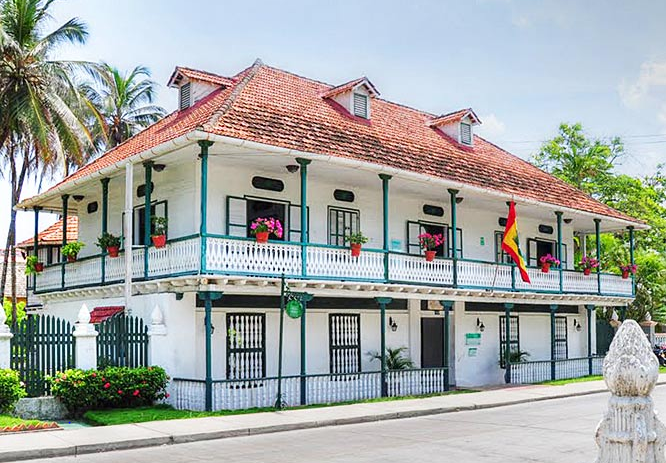
Casa del presidente Rafael Nuñez

House where lived Rafael Núñez, 4 times president of Colombia, with his wife Soledad Román Núñez. It is a mansion built entirely of wood. The building has guided visits and is equipped within the original period furniture. It also has a beautiful courtyard with lush vegetation.

Opposite the house across the street is the main entrance to the Apolo park and from there, statue of Rafael Nunez on his pedestal, watches his house.

The Foundation called "Casa Museo de el Cabrero" founded by Eduardo Lemaitre Roman and Teresita Roman de Zurek with the Ministry of Culture of Colombia administers the historical assets of Rafael Nunez and Soledad Román.

=== El Cabrero Church ===
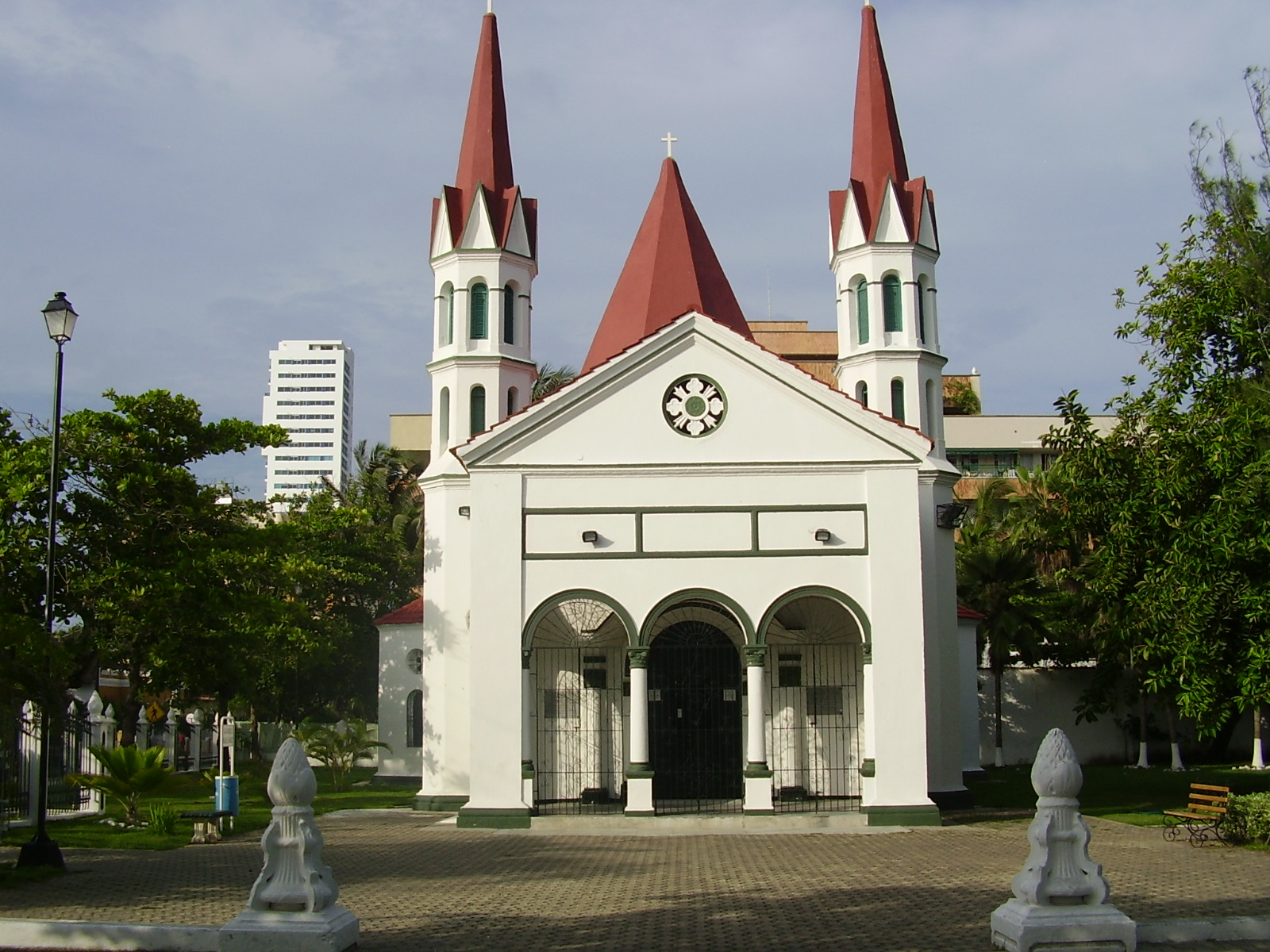
Iglesia del Cabrero

It is located inside the Apollo Park. It was built by Rafael Núñez for his wife Soledad could pray quietly as in other churches did not allow entry or was subject to all sorts of criticism. The reason was that she had married a divorced man as was Rafael Nunez and this constituted a scandal in the nineteenth century society of Cartagena.

In the Chapel on both sides of the main altar lie the mortal remains of President Rafael Núñez and his wife Soledad Román two mausoleums.

=== Apolo park ===
Algunos de los bustos

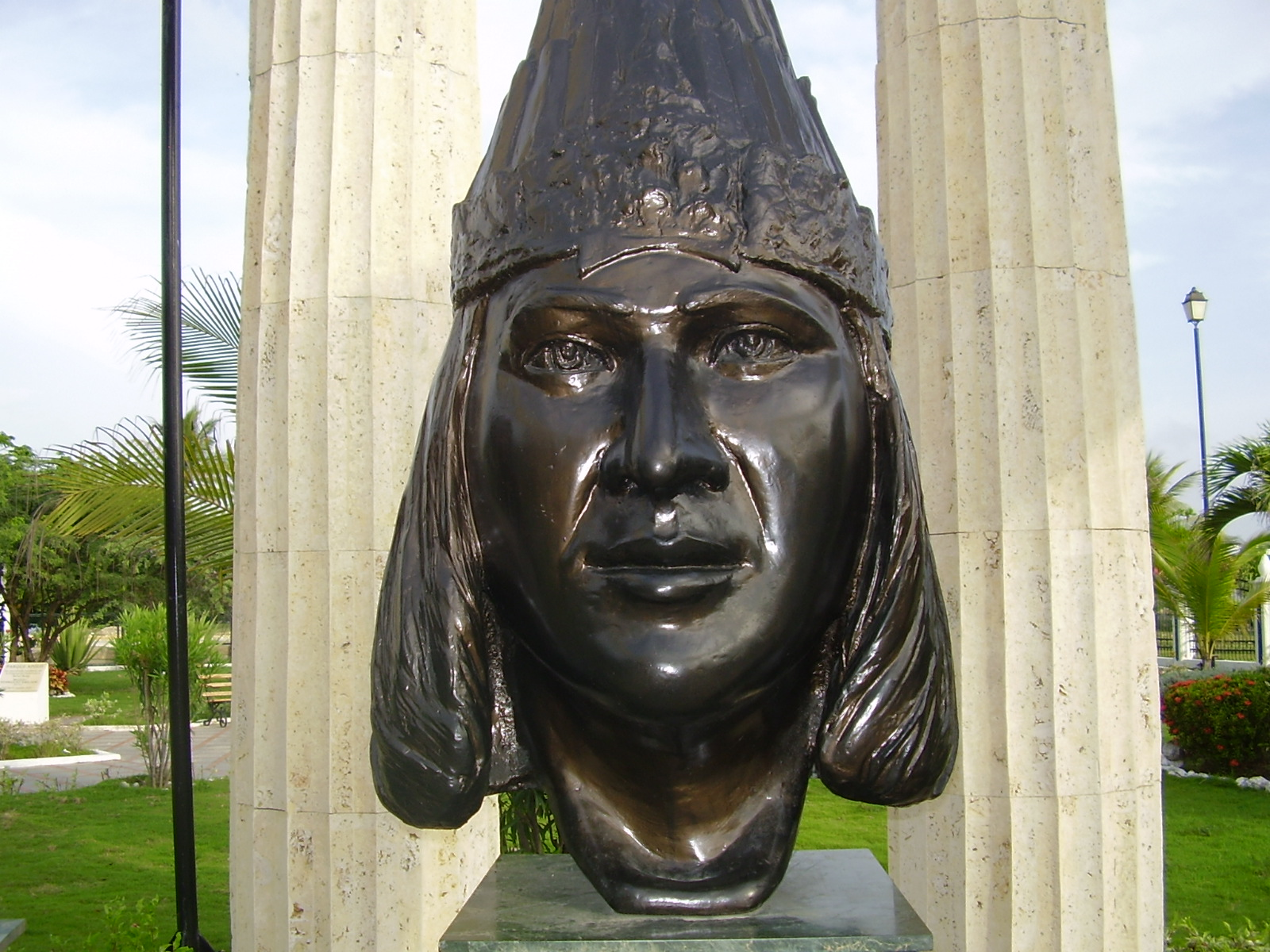

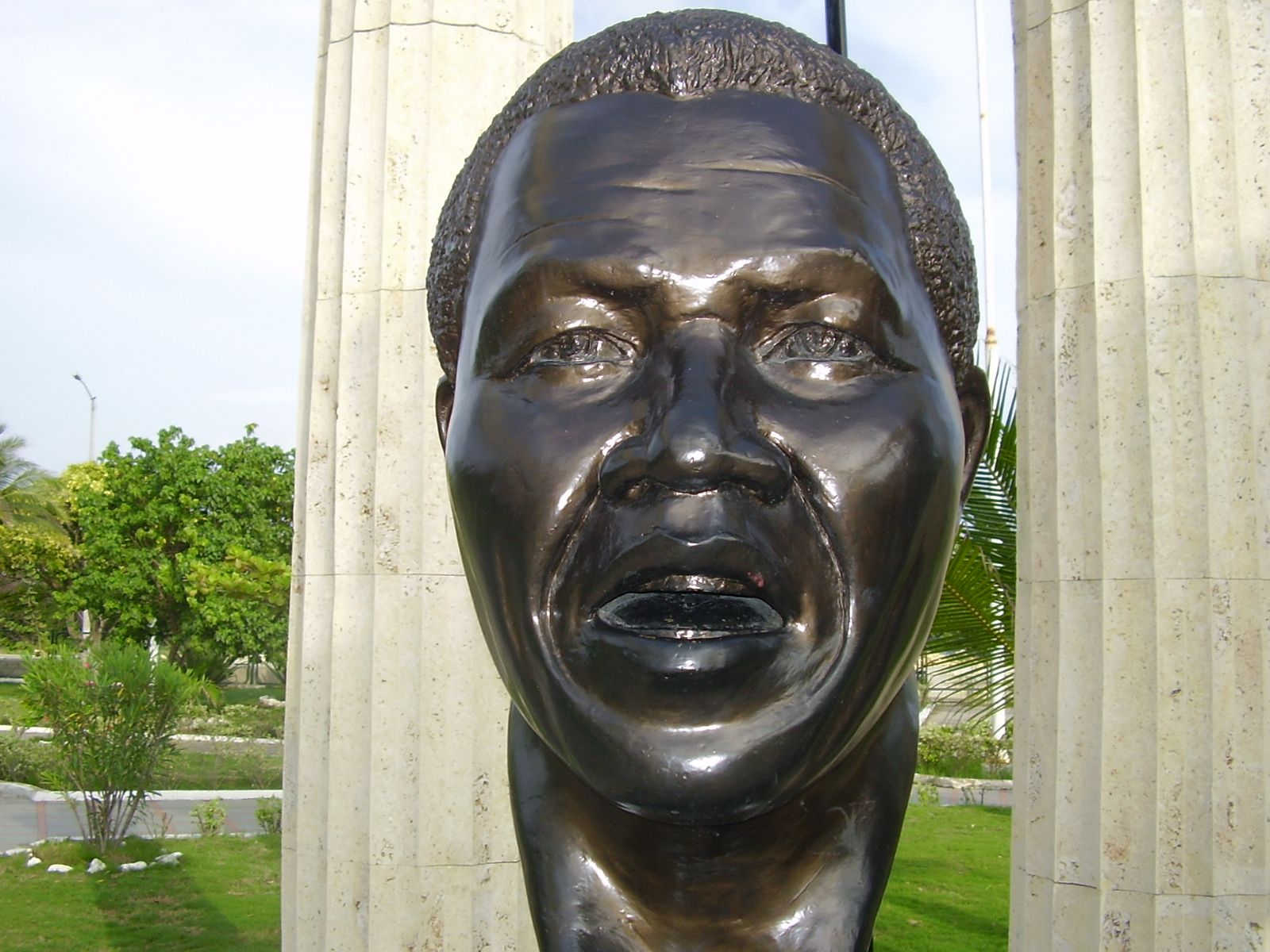

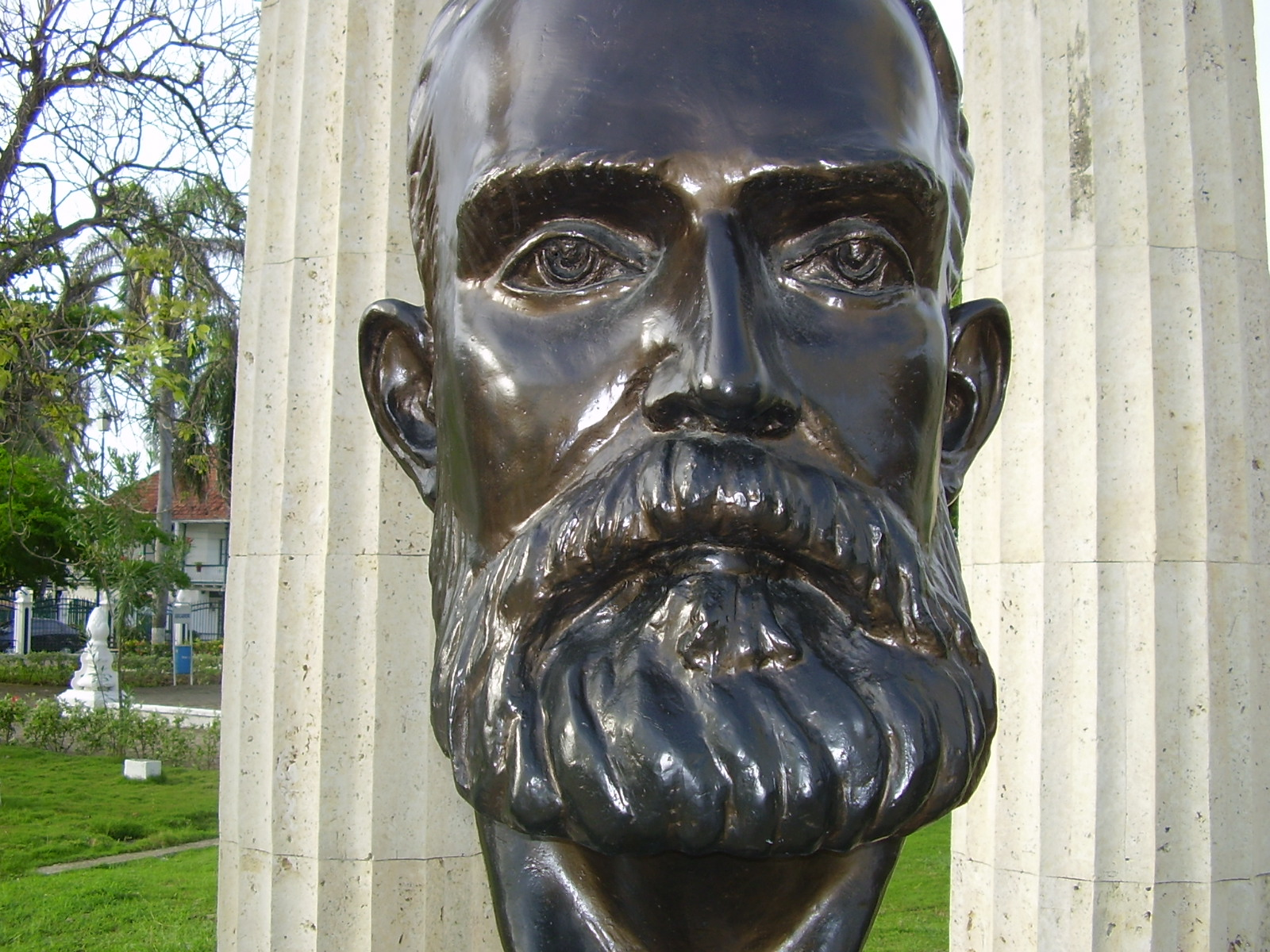

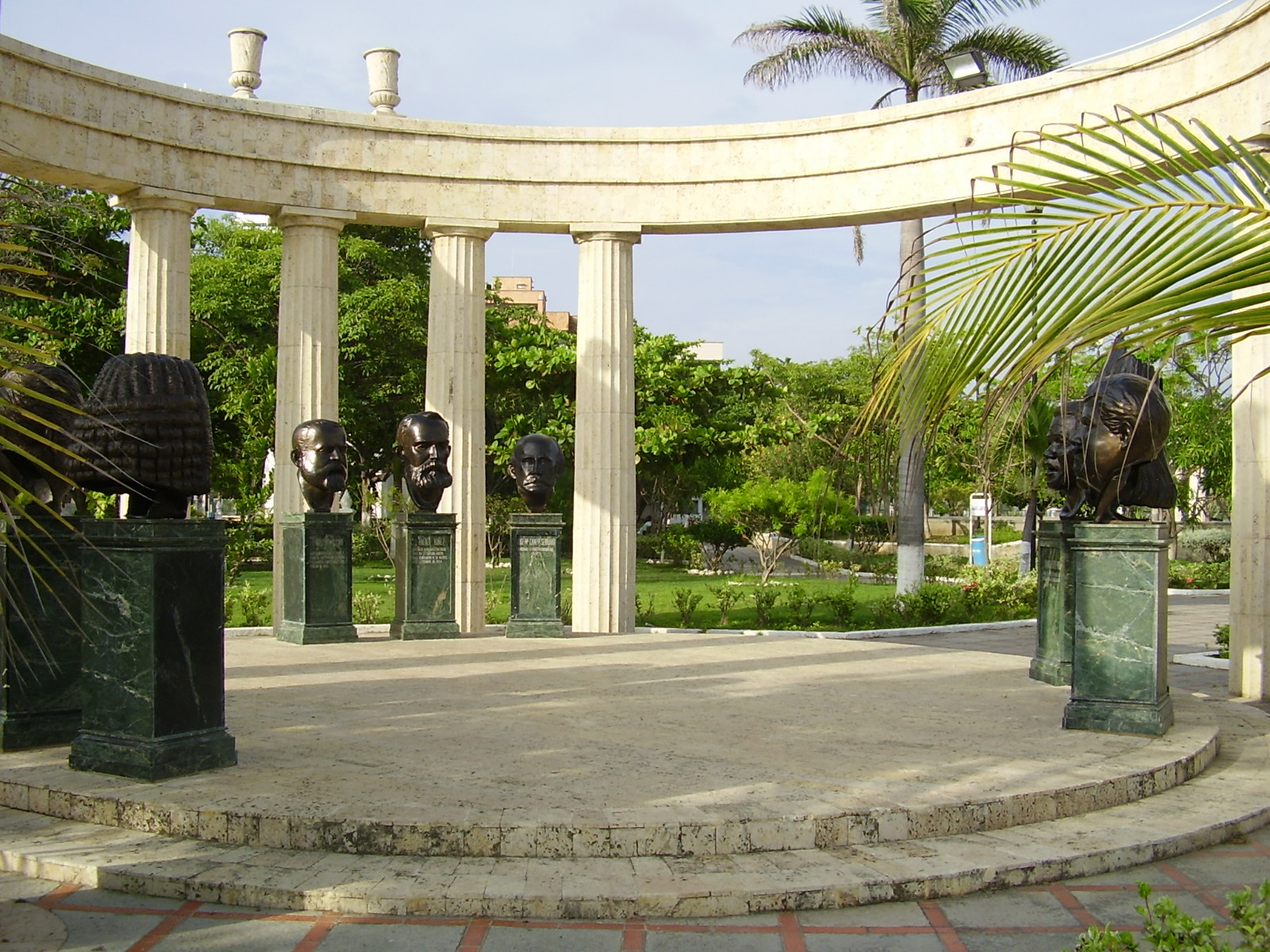
Overview of Apollo Park, with the busts of Rafael Núñez, Benkos Biohó and the Indian Carex.

Forms a set with the hermitage of Cabrero and the house of Rafael Nunez. At its center a monument stands as a tribute made to the Colombian Constitution of 1886 inspirated by Rafael Nuñez. It consists of a circular base surrounded by several columns supporting a circular lintel. At the base there are 9 pedestals with 9 busts of the most important figures of the three stages that divides the history of Colombia: pre-Columbian, colonial and republican. This 9 figures are:

- Carex: Carib Indian who faces Don Pedro de Heredia, founder of the city of Cartagena.
- Domingo Benkos Biohó: Leader of black slaves leading the fight for freedom, founder of San Basilio de Palenque
- Sebastián de Eslava: Viceroy of Viceroyalty of New Granada.
- Pedro Zapata de Mendoza: Governor of Cartagena. Responsible of the construction of "Canal del Dique" dam, and the primitive castle of San Felipe.
- Vicente Celedonio Piñeres: with his two brothers Gabriel and German led the political movement that led to the independence of Cartagena on November 11, 1811.
- General Juan José Nieto: President of Sovereign State of Bolívar. Besides military was historian and novelist.
- Miguel Antonio Caro: He wrote the Constitution of 1886.
- Rafael Núñez: President of Colombia and inspirator of the Constitution of 1886.
- José María Campo Serrano: He signed the Constitution of 1886.

Near this monument is another bust of Eduardo Lemaitre Roman, distinguished historian and academic, who dedicated his life to preserving the memory of Cartagena de Indias and studying its history. Eduardo Lemaitre Roman with his cousin Teresita Roman de Zurek founded the Casa Museo El Cabrero Foundation, the organization that manages and oversees the preservation of the legacy of Rafael Nuñez and Soledad Román.

=== National Federation of Coffee Growers of Colombia ===
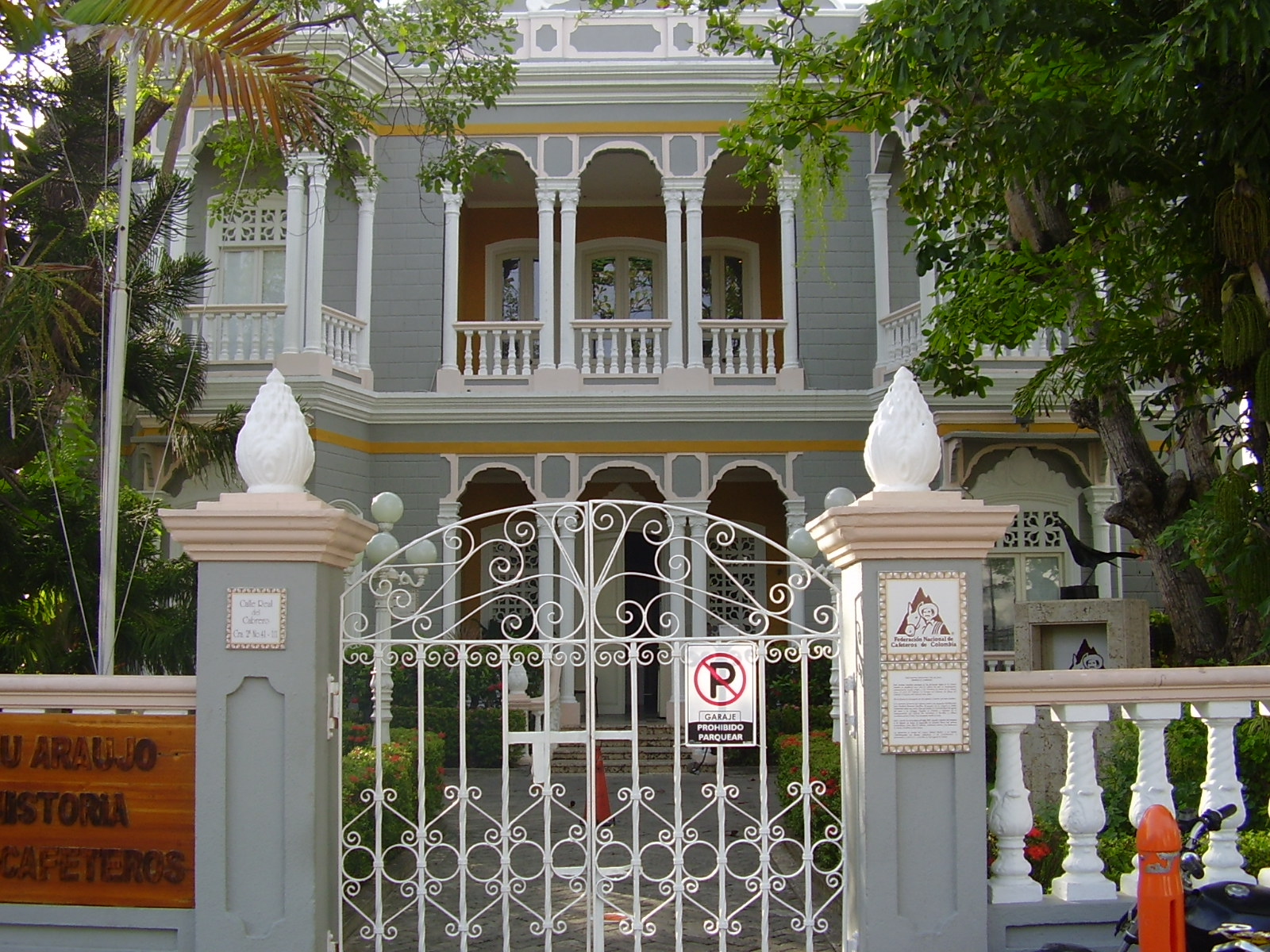
Headquarters of the National Federation of Coffee Growers

The National Federation of Coffee Growers of Colombia has its headquarters in a mansion adjacent to the house of Rafael Nunez on the Calle Real del Cabrero.
