= Felipe de Vergara Azcárate =

Former Colombian Lawyer

Excellency Felipe de Vergara Azcárate y Caycedo
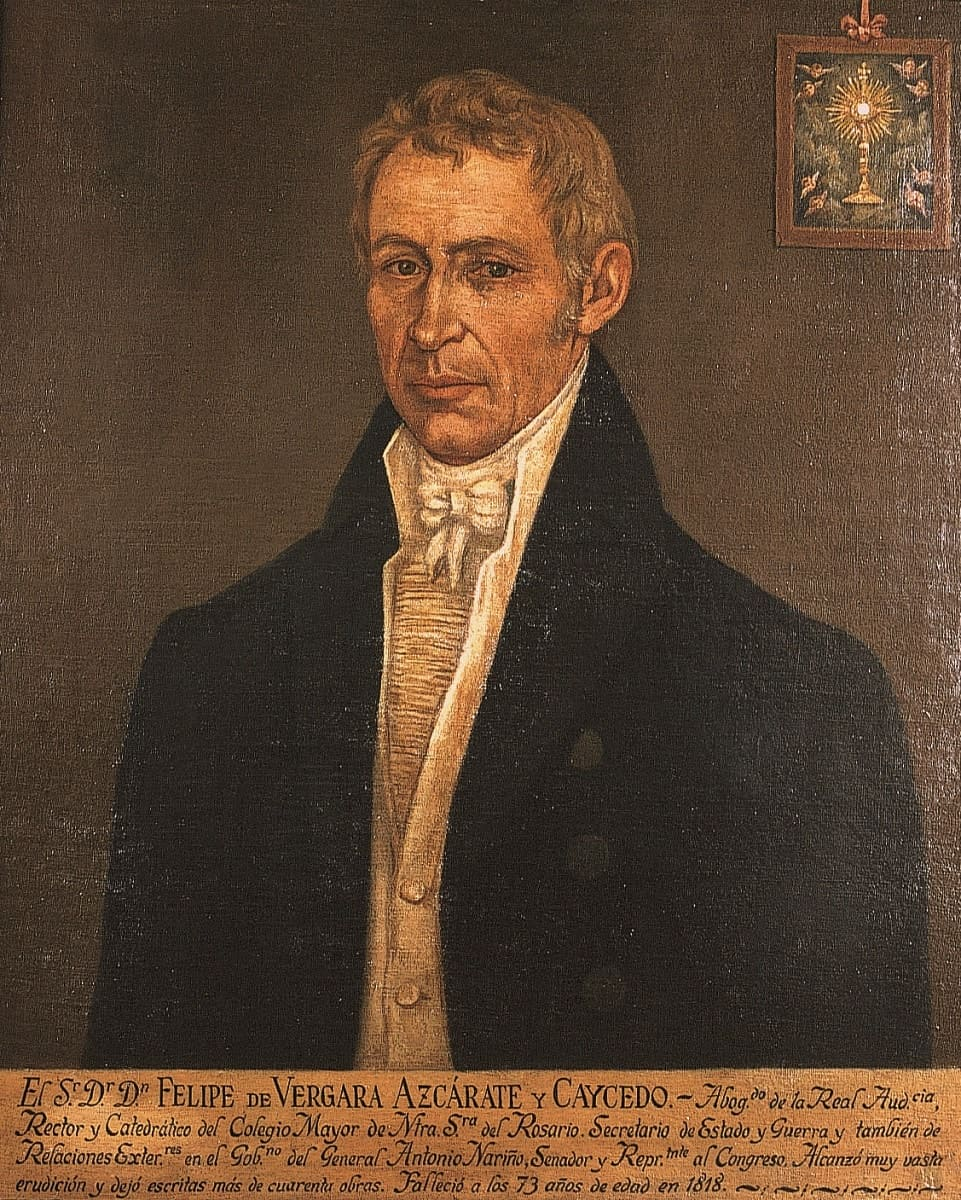

President of the Supreme Governing Junta of Cundinamarca

President of Government Council, State & War secretary
- In office November 26, 1812 – Jan 9 1813 Serving with José María Lozano de Peralta, José Gregorio Gutiérrez, Primo Groot, Domingo Caicedo
- President: Antonio Nariño
- Succeeded by: Domingo Caicedo

President of Senate

Mayor Accountant of the Bogotá Court of Accounts

Official Royal Accountant of the Panamá treasury

Lieutenant Governor of Cartagena de Indias
- In office 1785 – December 22, 1790
- Monarch: Charles III of Spain

Personal details
- Born: May 26, 1745
- Died: December 18, 1818 (aged 73)
- Party: Centralists
- Education: San Bartolomé & Del Rosario University
- Occupation: Fiscal Lawyer, Politician, Professor, Judge, Accountant, Mediator
- Profession: Doctor in Law

Military service
- Allegiance: Spanish Empire; Viceroyalty of New Granada; United Provinces of New Granada
- Rank: Lieutenant Governor

Felipe de Vergara Azcárate y Caycedo (May 26, 1745 - December 18, 1818) was a Colombian lawyer, professor, rector, Senator and Congressional Representative who held the presidency of Colombia from November 26, 1812, to December 14, 1812, also Lieutenant Governor of Cartagena de Indias and Prosecutor of the same, Royal Accountant of the treasury of Panamá, served as Secretary of State, War and Foreign Relations. He was principal member of the Government Junta appointed by General Antonio Nariño to govern Cundinamarca in his absence. Felipe was considered one of the best patriots who have distinguished themselves in all their vows and personal services.

As José María Caballero described it in Diario de la Independencia, he rubbed shoulders with characters who "the sparks of the fire lit in France" reached (like Antonio Nariño). He was considered a celebrity of the time due to his knowledge and eccentric attitude. Vergara was one of the most notable writers of the Colombian colony.

== Biography ==
Trajectory & Presidency

Felipe studied canons, law and mathematics, was received as a lawyer by the Royal Court in 1769. Lawyer and professor of theology and mathematics at the Colegio Mayor de Nuestra Señora del Rosario (now Del Rosario University). He became vice-chancellor of this establishment, and as such he assumed the rectory between January 6 and February 16, 1812, while his brother, Francisco Xavier de Vergara Azcarate y Caycedo, was away. He held the positions of official royal accountant of Panamá, mayor accountant of the Court of Accounts of Santafé and general adviser to the archbishopric. He defended the assets of Archbishop Viceroy Antonio José Amar y Borbón Arguedas against the claims of Antonio Nariño, Vergara was the closest friend of the Virrey in the new Kingdom to the point that when Amar was in jail, Felipe represented him through a legal trustee power.

Lived in Spain for 6 years, later returned and officiated as a lawyer in destinations such as Panamá and Cartagena. Designated by King Charles III of Spain as Prosecutor, Lieutenant governor of Cartagena de Indias between 1785 and 1790. He went to court carrying recommendations from the viceroy and audience, from the archbishop and from the metropolitan chapter in which they considered him (worthy of being attended due to his merits and circumstances) attests to the list of his merits and services, formed in the secretariat of the Supreme Council and Chamber of the Indies, on April 20, 1773.

Convinced of the need to separate from power to undertake the Southern Campaign, Antonio Nariño formed a Governing Board to replace him while he was absent from Santafé. As president of the same, he appointed Vergara in his capacity as Secretary of Government, and integrated the Secretaries of State, Grace, Justice and of the Treasury, as well as citizens José Ignacio Sanmiguel and José María Arrubla Martínez. Member of the Most Serene Electoral College of Cundinamarca; as such, he recorded his signature on the state constitution. General President Antonio Nariño chose him, along with four other men, to advise him on the new government. When Vergara Azcarate saw that the homeland was in danger, he came out in his defense as secretary of Government.

He passed the test of the Purification Council, in 1816, and his life was spared for his good conduct.

Notable Work

Felipe de Vergara Azcárate was one of the most notable writers of the Colombian colony, wrote more than 42 works, including Elements of Natural Philosophy that contain the principles of physics, demonstrated by mathematics and confirmed with observations and experiences, Elements of Plane Geometry, Elements of arithmetic, Elements of Astronomy, Discourse on the appeal, on the royal patronage and Genealogical history of the author's family, from the conquest to 1800. and others in different subjects such as philosophy, theology, literature, mathematics.

Family

Descendant of Navarrese nobility and houses of the Basque Country, more specifically from the town of Bergara in the province of Gipuzkoa, Spain.

Felipe was born in the capital of the viceroyalty of Nueva Granada, on May 26, 1745, member of one of the most illustrious, recognized and aristocratic families of the nascent Colombia from the marriage of the regent and Mayordomo of the chapel of the tabernacle of Bogotá, Francisco José Manuel Vergara Azcarate Vela y Sandoval, born in Bucaramanga, on October 4, 1712, and Petronila de Caycedo y Vélez Ladrón de Guevara, born in Santafé, on April 17, 1717. His grandparents were José De Vergara Azcarate y Dávila, born in Santafé, on March 13, 1684, and Gertrudis Patiño de Rincón. And his great-grandparents Francisco de Vergara Azcárate Mayorga y Olmos, born in Santafé, on September 23, 1647, and Ursula Gómez de Sandoval y Mesa, born in the aforementioned city, on November 2, 1656, and daughter of Sergeant Major Gabriel Gómez de Sandoval y Arraita, a forerunner of the construction of the Chapel of the Tabernacle in Bogotá and its patron, making Felipe descendant of the noble family Gómez de Sandoval. Felipe had to suffer many bitterness and family tragedies, such as seeing some of his nephews executed, such as José de Ayala y Vergara and José Gregorio Gutiérrez, seeing others flee like his brother Cristobal de Vergara Azcárate y Caycedo, his nephew Tadeo Vergara marched as soldier, whom the soldiers of Fernando VII sacrificed with sticks on the burning plains of Casanare, and to see another of his nephews, the clergyman Pantaleon de Ayala y Vergara, go into exile. he mourned the loss of many of his relatives and his most beloved friends, even suffering firsthand the humiliation of being judged by ignorant soldiers elevated to the category of judges without previous experience. Felipe's great-grandfather was the Royal Treasurer of the Santa fe Mint Antonio de Vergara Azcárate y Dávila, born in Cádiz, on January 11, 1612, Major Bailiff of the Inquisition, Knight of the Order of Santiago, Field Master, Ensign and Lieutenant Captain General of Artillery. Governor of Cartagena, Maracaibo and the General Captaincy of Mérida. Also Captain, Sergeant Major and Ordinary Mayor of Santafé de Bogotá, founder of the illustrious and noble family in the new world that perpetrated his surname Vergara-Azcarate in the Andean heights of what is now Colombia. He was the uncle of the internal President of the United Provinces of New Granada Luis de Ayala y Vergara and the chronicler José de Ayala y Vergara. There were 16 siblings, some of whom were recognized such as Cristóbal de Vergara Azcarate y Caycedo, Francisco Xavier de Vergara Azcarate y Caycedo, Antonio, Juan, María Josefa, Ignacia, Genoveva. He died single and childless.
