= José de Ayala y Vergara =

New Granadan lawyer and commander (1761–1816)

Mayor of Bogotá
- In office 1793-1794
- Preceded by: Carlos de Burgos
- Succeeded by: Eustaquio Galavis Hurtado

Personal details
- Born: 1761 Bogotá, Viceroyalty of New Granada
- Died: August 13, 1816 San Victorino, Bogotá, United Provinces of New Granada
- Education: San Bartolomé
- Profession: Literature & Law

Military service
- Rank: Lieutenant Coronel; Grenadier Captain; Mayor
- Unit: Artillery Commander; Fusileros Battalion; Battalion Bogotá; Expedition of Baraya; Urban Infantry Militia
- Battles/wars: Battle of Palacé; Battle of Cachirí; Colombian Civil War

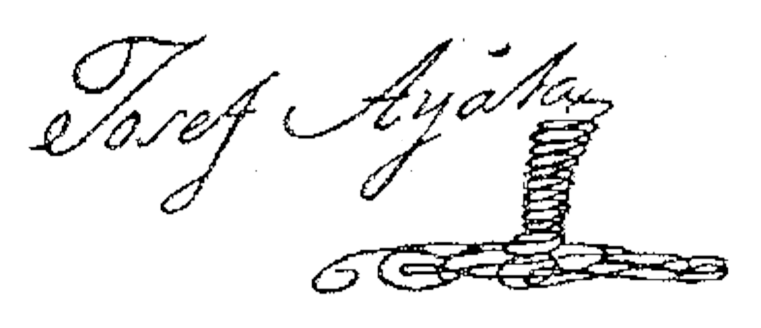
Signature of José de Ayala y Vergara

José de Ayala y Vergara (1761 – August 13, 1816) was a Neogranadine martyr of the independence of Colombia, lawyer, lieutenant colonel and commander of different patriot insurgent battalions who fought against the Spanish rule in the Viceroyalty of New Granada.

In 1812 Ayala y Vergara signed the act of Sogamoso, obeying the government of Tunja disavowing the Government of Cundinamarca. Four years later he was killed by order of Pablo Morillo while the country's first civil war was being fought.

== Biography ==
Born in an aristocratic family to Antonio de Ayala y Tamayo and Josefa de Vergara Azcárate, his brother was president Luis de Ayala y Vergara. He was cousin and uncle of different presidents of Colombia.

Ayala y Vergara was a dear childhood friend of Antonio Narino, and by 1791 they organized revolutionary clubs together to light the spark of independence. In 1794, Nariño procured a copy of the "Declaration of the Rights of Man", which was being distributed by the French Assembly. He translated the Declaration of the Rights of Man from its original French into Spanish and printed several copies from his own private press. He then circulated these translated pamphlets among his politically like-minded friends, José was involved, the Audience accused him for conspiracy against the King Fernando VII. For this he was imprisoned for three years at the San Felipe Castle in Cartagena de Indias. In October 1795 he was exiled from to South America, and was sent to Spain, later returned. He was charged with Conspiration and sedition against the King. He was imprisoned alongside revolutionaries like Sinforoso Mutis, Francisco Antonio Zea, Louis de Rieux, Pedro Pradilla and Antonio Ricaurte.

During the 20 of July 1810 José was designated by the supreme court as Leader of Artillery, later captain of militias commanded by Antonio Baraya and Joaquín Ricaurte.

In later years, José distanced himself from Antonio Nariño and ended up in opposite sides, both became main oppositors, ironically his brother Luis followed Nariño. He became a patriot insurgent, fought and got captured together with Francisco de Paula Santander, in this incident José lost a couple of fingers. He fought in different battles such as the Battle of Palacé and the Battle of Cachirí in order to liberate Colombia from Spanish rule and gain independence.

While he was trying to escape, the Spanish army captured him and was sentenced to death. He was killed in San Victorino, Bogotá in 1816. General Pablo Morillo wrote to the Spanish Ministry of War about José's death:

''He was a Lieutenant Colonel and Commander of an Insurgent Battalion, an obstinate revolutionary and enemy of the king. This same individual was indicted in the revolution of '94, and has always followed his own system until his final moments. In this capital, he was shot in the back, and his goods were confiscated.''
