= Soledad Román de Núñez =

First Lady of Colombia (1887–1888, 1892–1894)

Soledad Román de Nuñez
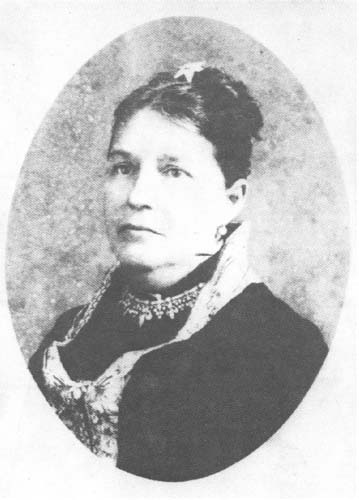
- Portrait c. 1888.

First Lady of Colombia
- In role August 7, 1892 – September 18, 1894
- President: Rafael Núñez
- Preceded by: Margarita Caro de Holguín
- Succeeded by: Ana de Narváez de Caro
- In role June 4, 1887 – August 7, 1888
- President: Rafael Núñez
- Preceded by: Position established
- Succeeded by: Margarita Caro de Holguín

Personal details
- Born: Soledad Román Polanco; October 6, 1835 Cartagena, Bolívar, New Granada
- Died: June 19, 1924 (aged 89) Cartagena, Bolívar, Colombia
- Resting place: Chapel of El Cabrero
- Spouse: Rafael Núñez (m. 1877; died 1894)
- Parents: Manuel Román y Picón (father); Rafaela Polanco de Román (mother)
- Known for: Spouse of the president of United States of Colombia (1880–1882, 1884–1886)

Soledad Román de Núñez (née Román Polanco; October 6, 1835 – June 19, 1924) was the first lady of Colombia from 1886 to 1894 as the second wife of President Rafael Núñez. Soledad is considered to have wielded a considerable influence in policy and participated in state affairs in Colombia during the presidencies of her spouse more than any other woman in Colombia before her. She is credited with the victory of the government in the conflict of 1885, as well as the Concordat of 1887. She was a controversial figure, because her marriage was not recognized by the Catholic church, as the wedding had been civil, as her spouse's first wife was still alive and he was still married to her in the eyes of the Catholic church.

== Early life ==
Soledad Román Polanco was born on October 6, 1835 in Cartagena as the eldest daughter of Manuel Román Picón and Manuela Polanco. During much of her youth, "Sia Sola" as she was called by her family, her long stays at her father's Botica Román allowed Soledad to establish her first contacts with political and economic leaders of Cartgena, among whom Juan José Nieto stands out.

== Marriage to Rafael Núñez ==
Román Polanco had been engaged for 5 years to the Catalan migrant Pedro Macía whom she never married due to the postponement of her marriage. On June 14, 1877 they were married in Paris before the Consul of Colombia in France José Triana. Which sparked rejection and controversy on the part of Colombian society, calling Núñez a bigamist even though he was married to Dolores Gallegos. Román de Núñez was widely rejected by society and her husband's opponents.

During the 1880 Colombian presidential election, Rafael Núñez became the new president of the then United States of Colombia. Due to the rejection that his name meant, Román de Núñez decided not to accompany him to Bogotá, so Soledad lived the four years of the first presidency of her husband in Cartagena, later during the 1884 elections, her husband was elected for a second term, so this time she decided to accompany her husband to the San Carlos Palace.

== First Lady of Colombia ==
Román de Núñez was unpopular, and on multiple occasions harshly criticized when she was found to be Rafael Núñez's lover, despite being married to him, society continued to see Dolores Gallegos as Núñez's wife, which generated rivalries between those who defended that the union between Rafael Núñez and Soledad was real.

Román de Núñez was characterized by having a politically active role, becoming a great influence on some of her husband's political decisions, the most relevant being her intervention in the political project of regeneration as well as her interim presidency during the Civil war of 1885. Later he would make use of his political influence and his links with different political leaders with whom he negotiated the union with the Núñez side against the Liberal insurgents, which ended in their defeat and the promulgation of the constitution of 1886, as well as the signing of the concordat of 1887.

== See also ==
- House of Illustrious Guests — First Presidential House
- San Carlos Palace — Second Presidential House
- El Cabrero neighborhood — place of residence of Soledad Román de Núñez.

Honorary titles
New title	First Lady of Colombia; 1887–1888	Succeeded by Margarita Caro de Holguín
Preceded by Margarita Caro de Holguín	First Lady of Colombia; 1892–1894	Succeeded by Ana de Narváez de Caro
