= Groot family =

Groot
- Aristocracy, Political family
- Current region: Colombia
- Etymology: Big
- Origin: Dutch
- Founder: José Groot de Vargas
- Final ruler: Pedro Groot y Alea

The Groot family is a Colombian aristocratic lineage of Dutch origin, prominent from the eighteenth to the early twentieth century, particularly influential in Bogotá. Their members included a former national president, poets, writers, and politicians. Some key figures are José Groot de Vargas, Primo and Pedro Groot, José María Rivas Groot and Helena Groot.
