= Margarita Caro de Holguín =

First Lady of Colombia from 1888 to 1892

First Lady of Colombia
- In role 7 August 1888 – 7 August 1892
- President: Carlos Holguín Mallarino
- Preceded by: Soledad Román de Núñez
- Succeeded by: Soledad Román de Núñez

Personal details
- Born: Margarita Caro Tovar; 10 June 1848 Santa Fe de Bogotá, New Granada
- Died: 28 April 1925 (aged 76) Bogotá, D.C., Colombia
- Resting place: Central Cemetery of Bogotá
- Party: Conservative
- Spouse: Carlos Holguín Mallarino (m. 1878)
- Children: 3
- Relatives: Holguín family; Miguel Antonio Caro (brother)
- Occupation: Politician; socialité; social worker

Margarita Caro de Holguín (née Caro Tovar; 10 June 1848 – 28 April 1925) was the First Lady of Colombia from 1882 to 1892, as the wife of President Carlos Holguín Mallarino.

Born in Santa Fe de Bogotá, New Granada (now Bogotá, D.C.) in 1848, her husband became Minister of Foreign Affairs during the presidency of Rafael Núñez in 1887. After Núñez's resignation in 1888, her husband took office on August 7 of that year, having been confirmed by the Congress as the new president by presidential succession. Caro de Holguín later supported her brother during his presidency.

== Early life ==
Margarita Caro Tobar was born in Bogotá on June 10, 1848 to José Eusebio Caro and Blasina Tovar. He grew up with two older brothers, Miguel and Eusebio.

Honorary titles
Preceded by Soledad Román de Núñez	First Lady of Colombia; 1888–1892	Succeeded by Soledad Román de Núñez
