= Cristóbal de Vergara Azcárate =

Colombian lawyer and politician (1766–1831)

Cristóbal de Vergara Azcárate y Caycedo (1766–1831) was a Colombian lawyer, professor, accountant and politician who graduated from Del Rosario University in Bogotá. Vergara served as Minister of Finance, governor of Cundinamarca, Cauca (1825) and Boyacá, designated by President Francisco de Paula Santander. He also was the administrator of the sea salt mines of Zipaquirá during the presidency of Simón Bolívar. Between 1795 and 1804, Vergara worked as the Accountant of the Royal Accounts and administered the prominent monopoly of Aguardiente.

He was persecuted by the Spaniards in the Reconquista of 1816.

Cristóbal de Vergara Azcárate was the brother of president Felipe de Vergara and the uncle of president Estanislao Vergara.
