= Teresa Román Vélez =

Colombian writer and chef (1925–2021)

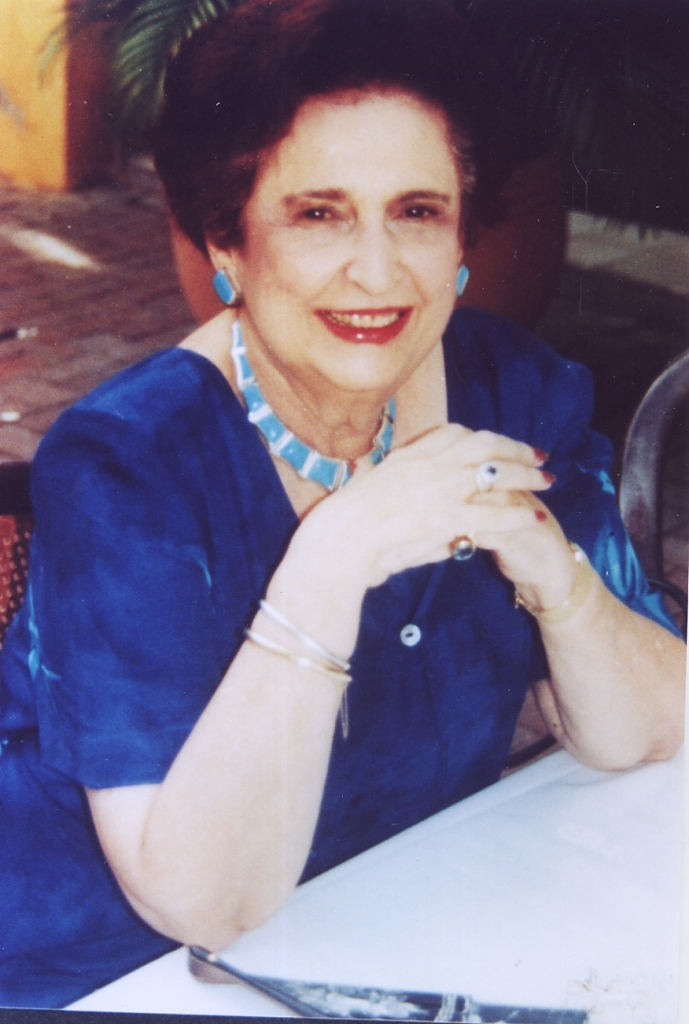
Teresita Román de Zurek (2003)

Teresita Román de Zurek (29 December 1925 – 2 May 2021) was a Colombian writer and chef.

== Biography ==
Teresa Román was born in Cartagena, Colombia, 29 December 1925. She came from a family of prominent chemists who emigrated from Spain in the early nineteenth century. Her father invented Kola Román, a pink soda drink, which she used as an ingredient in many of her recipes. In 1963, Román published her first cookbook, Cartagena de Indias en la Olla, which has since been published in 45 editions in Spanish and English. In 1998, she published Mis Postres, a short cookbook mostly consisting of chocolate desserts. In 2004, she received a distinction from the Popayan Cooking Festival for her work to preserve the native cuisine of Cartagena. Román also belonged to the international Chaîne des Rôtisseurs.

Román began working at the Colombian Red Cross in the Department of Bolivar in the mid-1960s. She founded the association "Damas Grises" and was its regional president from 1992 to 2000, before being named Honorary National President.

The Fundación Casa Museo del Cabrero works to promote the legacy of Colombian President Rafael Nuñez. The Rafael Nuñez House museum is located in the Cabrero neighborhood in Cartagena. Román led the organization after the death of founder Eduardo Lemaitre.

Román lived in Casa Román, an extravagant nineteenth-century Moorish property in Cartagena. She had a collection of 1,470 dolls representing the nations of the world. She began the collection in 1948 with a Romería del Rocío baby doll in a frilly linen skirt. One of her most recent acquisitions was a doll of Shakira. The dolls are stored in glass displays in a corner room of Casa Román.

She was awarded several times for her contribution to and preservation of the culture of Colombia and Cartagena. In 2006, she was named Honorary Mayor of the City of Cartagena de Indias.

== Legacy ==
Roman was included in a book by Gabriel García Márquez about real-life characters who had inspired characters from his books.

== See also ==
- Colombian cuisine

== Sources ==
- http://www.cartagenacaribe.com/cultura/cocina.htm
- https://web.archive.org/web/20110606044504/http://www.univision.com/content/content.jhtml?cid=768468
- https://web.archive.org/web/20070313220008/http://www.ocexcelsior.com/mi_cocina/0715/0715_mi_cocina_er_sancocho.shtml
- https://web.archive.org/web/20070928070204/http://www.concierge.com/cntraveler/articles/detail?articleId=10622&pageNumber=5
- https://web.archive.org/web/20091109163417/http://www.teresitaromandezurek.com/
- Concierge.com
