= San Victorino =

- Barrio
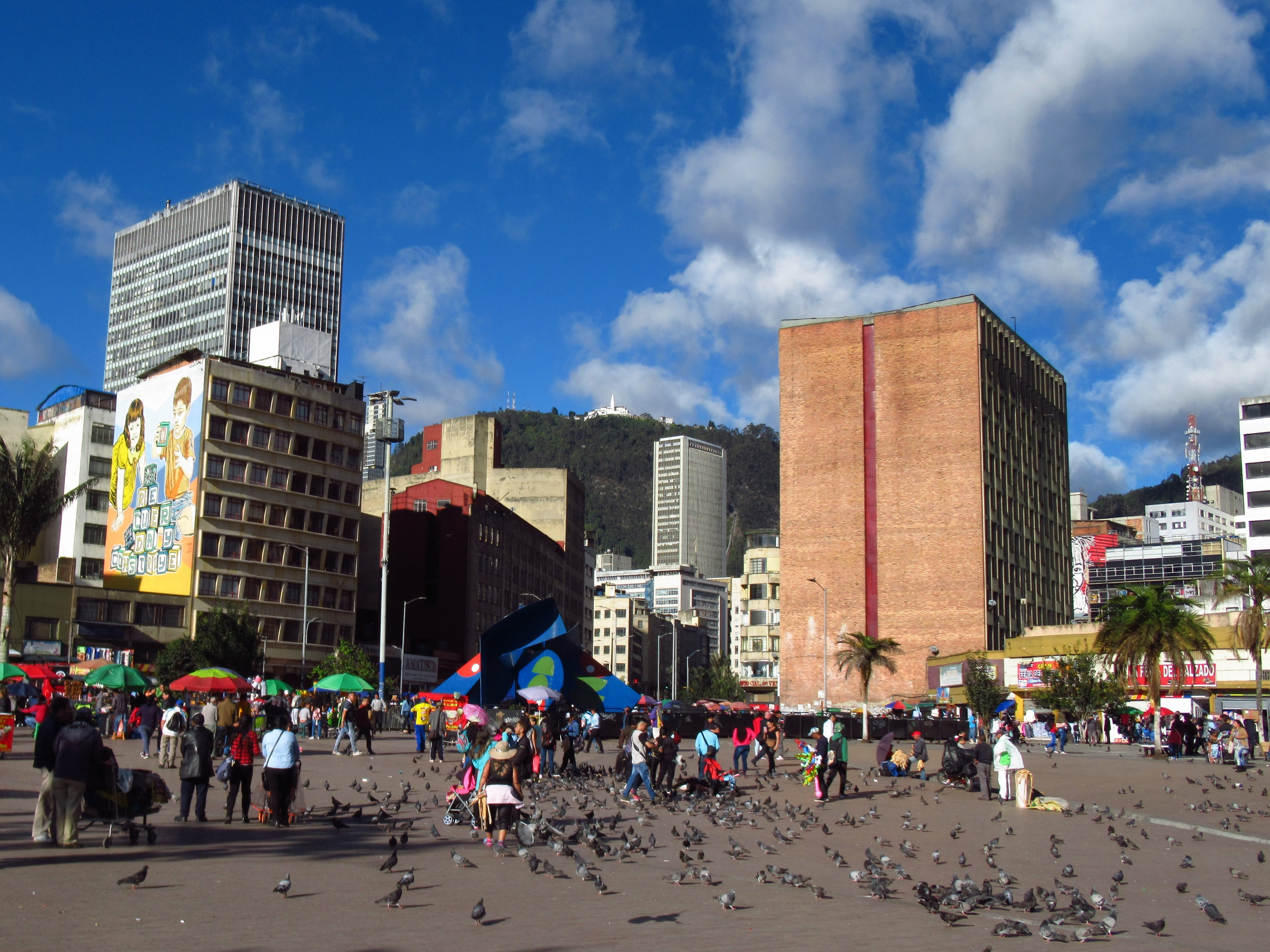
- Country: Colombia
- Department: Distrito Capital
- City: Bogotá

San Victorino is a commercial neighbourhood (barrio) of Bogotá, Colombia.
