= Holguín family =

Colombian political family and former first family

Holguín
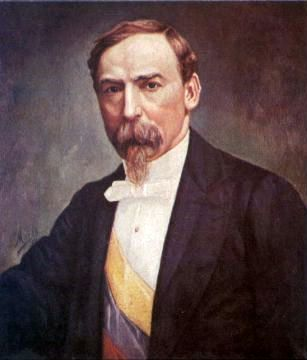
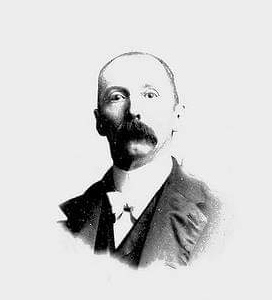
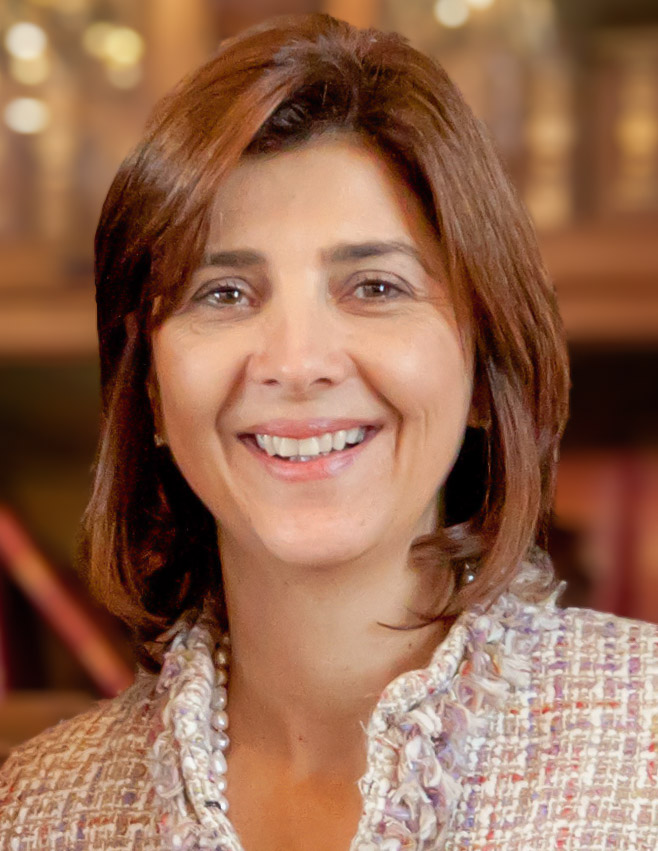
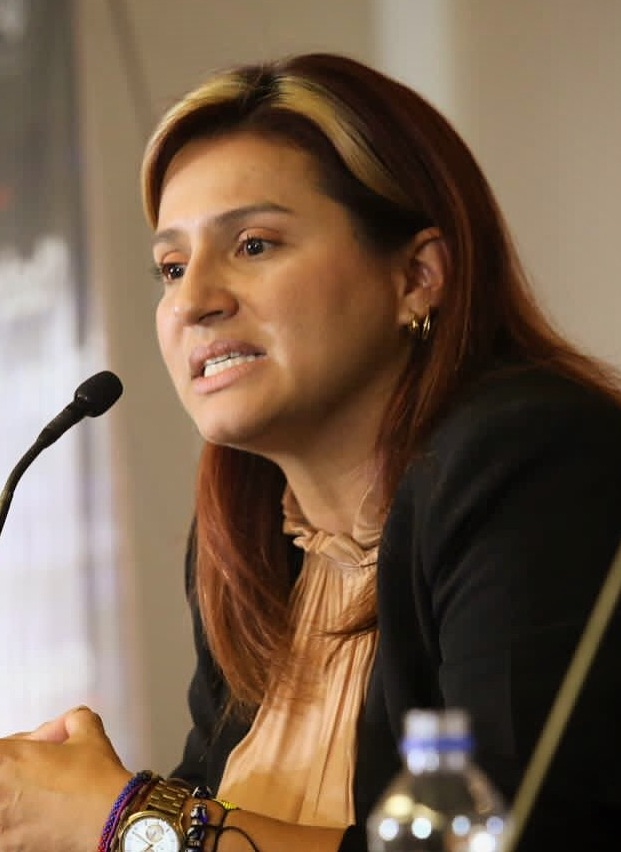
- Carlos Holguín Jorge Holguín María Ángela Holguín Paola Holguín
- Current region: Bogotá, D.C.
- Origin: Boyacá; Granada
- Titles: List: President of Colombia; First Lady of Colombia; Minister of Foreign Affairs of Colombia; Permanent Representative of Colombia to the United Nations; Senator; Colombian Congressman (from Bogotá)
- Connected families: Arboleda family Mallarino family Caro family Montejo family Lleras family Sánchez family

The Holguín family is a Colombian political family that has played a prominent role in Colombian politics since the 1890s, primarily as the first family of Colombia from 1888 to 1892 and from 1921 to 1922, during the presidencies of Carlos Holguín and Jorge Holguín, respectively. They also played a prominent role in Colombian diplomacy, art, journalism, and business. The Holguín family is one of five families to have produced more than one president of Colombia by the same surname; the others were the López, Ospina, Santos and Lleras families.

Known for their political involvement, their relatives have held various national and state positions over four generations, including ambassador to Colombia (President Carlos Holguín; and Jorge Holguín). Other relatives include the diplotic María Ángela Holguín; and senator Paola Holguín. The Holguín family is primarily of Spanish descent. Their European origins date back to the 15th century, with Nicolás Martín Holguín being their first ancestor born in Colombia, in 1786. The Holguín family originated in Granada and Extramadura through settlers who arrived in Colombia, settling in Boyacá.

== Relatives ==
- Nicolás Martín Holguín
  - Juan Holguín
    - Vicente Holguín (1788-1864)
    - María Josefa Mallarino de Holguín
      - Carlos Holguín Mallarino (1832-1894)
      - Margarita Caro de Holguín (1848-1925)
        - Julia Holguín
        - María Holguín
        - Catalina Holguín
        - Álvaro Holguín (1889-1973)
        - María Josefa Vargas de Holguín
          - María Clara Holguín
          - María Josefa Holguín
          - Margarita Holguín
          - Álvaro Holguín Vargas
        - Hernando Holguín (1871-1921)
        - Mercedes Holguín Lloreda de Holguín
        - Clemencia Holguín de Urdaneta (1894-1990)
        - Roberto Urdaneta (1890-1972)
          - Rafael Urdaneta
          - Carlos Urdaneta
          - Enrique Urdaneta
          - Clemencia Urdaneta
          - María Consuelo Urdaneta
        - Margarita Holguín
        - Jaime Holguín
      - Jorge Holguín Mallarino (1848-1928)
      - Cecilia Arboleda de Holguín (1859-1924)
        - Matilde Holguín Arboleda
        - Sofía Holguín Arboleda
        - Ricardo Holguín Arboleda
        - Daniel Holguín Arboleda
        - Beatriz Holguín Arboleda
        - Helena Holguín Arboleda
        - Rafael Holguín Arboleda (1888-1967)
        - Clementina Umaña de Holguín (1899-?)
          - Julio Holguín Umaña (1926-?)
          - Lucila Cuellar de Holguín
            - María Ángela Holguín (born 1963)
        - Cecilia Holguín Arboleda
        - Jorge Holguín Arboleda
        - Alicia Holguín Arboleda
        - Julio Holguín Arboleda
        - Pablo Holguín Arboleda

== See also ==
- List of presidents of Colombia
- Political families of the world
