= José Groot de Vargas =

Spanish official in Viceroyalty of New Granada (b. 1726)

Mayor of Bogotá
- In office 1759, 1761, and 1770
- Preceded by: Gregorio Londoño
- Succeeded by: Francisco Antonio Moreno y Escandón

Personal details
- Born: 1726 Seville, Spain
- Died: xviii Santafé, Viceroyalty of New Granada
- Relations: José Manuel Groot (grandson)
- Children: Primo Groot, Pedro Groot
- Profession: Military

Military service
- Allegiance: Spanish Empire
- Rank: Captain of the cuirassier guard Mayor

José Groot de Vargas Machuca (Seville, 1726–18th century) was a Spaniard of Dutch origin who lived in the Viceroyalty of New Granada. There he was perpetual rapporteur and ordinary mayor of Santafé (now Bogotá) on three occasions, in 1759, 1761 and 1770. He was one of the most influential figures in the Viceroyalty of New Granada during the second half of the 18th century.

In 1749, he was captain of the cuirassier guard of Viceroy José Alfonso Pizarro. In 1761, he was appointed ordinary mayor of Santafé as the first vote as well as faithful executor of the town hall. That same year he was responsible for the ceremonial inauguration of the viceroy Pedro Mesía de la Cerda. Later, he was appointed as deputy to receive the ambassador of the viceroy Manuel de Guirior.

He even threatened the Marquis of San Jorge Jorge Miguel Lozano de Peralta with the sword after insulting him by telling him, "that he had a stain from the earth, that he was an enemy of the chapetónes, that he had a seamless tunic and that he had no baptismal certificate," after a dispute in the town hall.

In 1769, he acted as the perpetual rapporteur and signed a letter sent to Viceroy Mesía to protest against the doormen of the audiencia of Santafé, who obstructed his path to first kiss the hands of Fray José de Jesús María before the hands of the oidores. His signature is also found in a statement along with other personalities during the rebellion of the commoners in 1781. In 1789, he was part of the staff of the Santafé Mint.

== Marriage and offspring ==
Groot de Vargas was the patriarch of the Groot family in Colombia and married Manuela de Alea, who was the daughter of Juan de Alea y Estrada from Collado in the Principality of Asturias, and Juana Liaño. He was the father of Pedro Groot and Primo Groot, who were both leaders of the Colombian independence movement. He was also the grandfather of José Manuel Groot.
