= Santos family =

Colombian political family and former first family

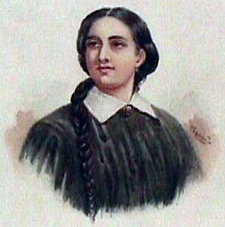
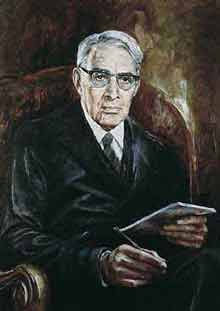
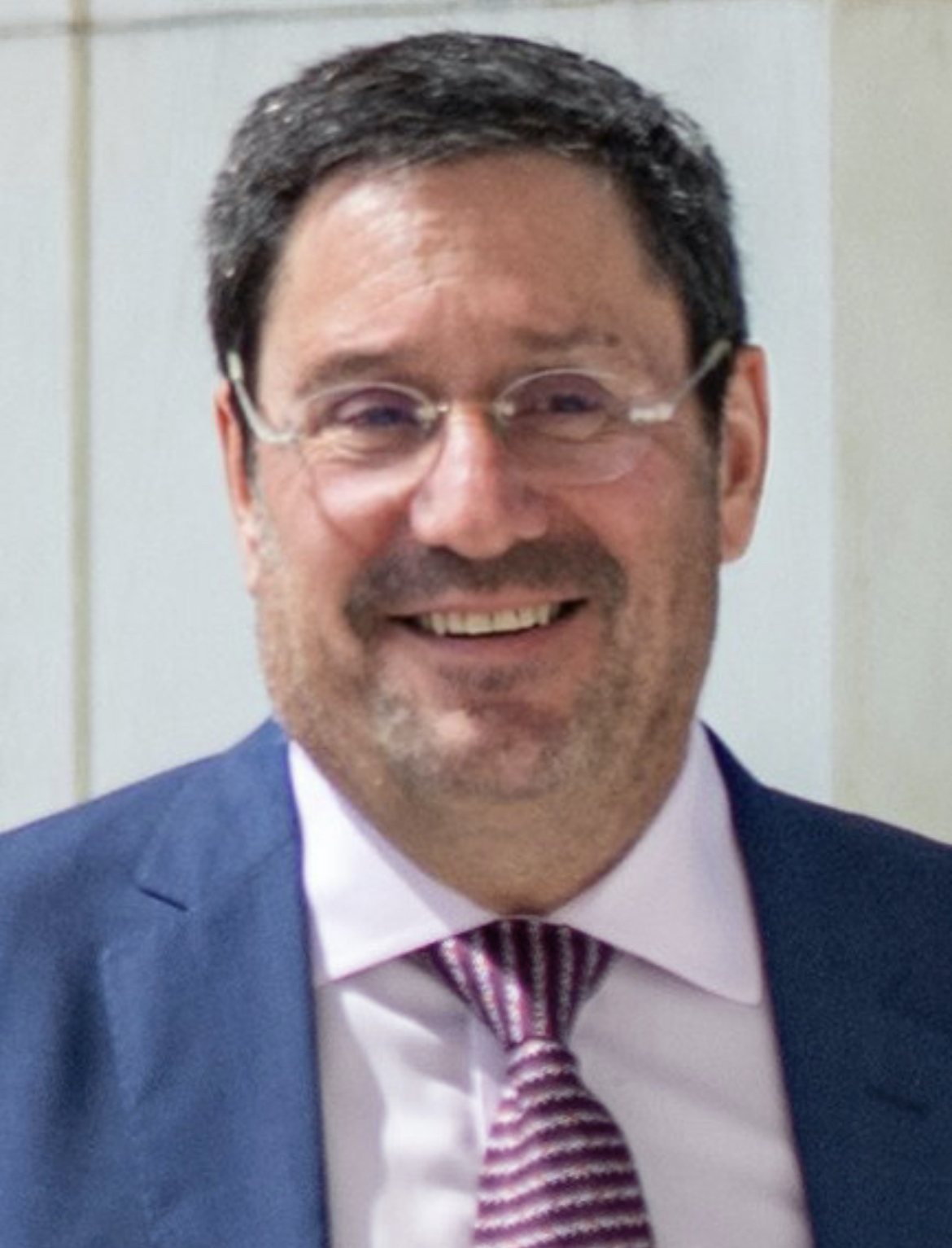
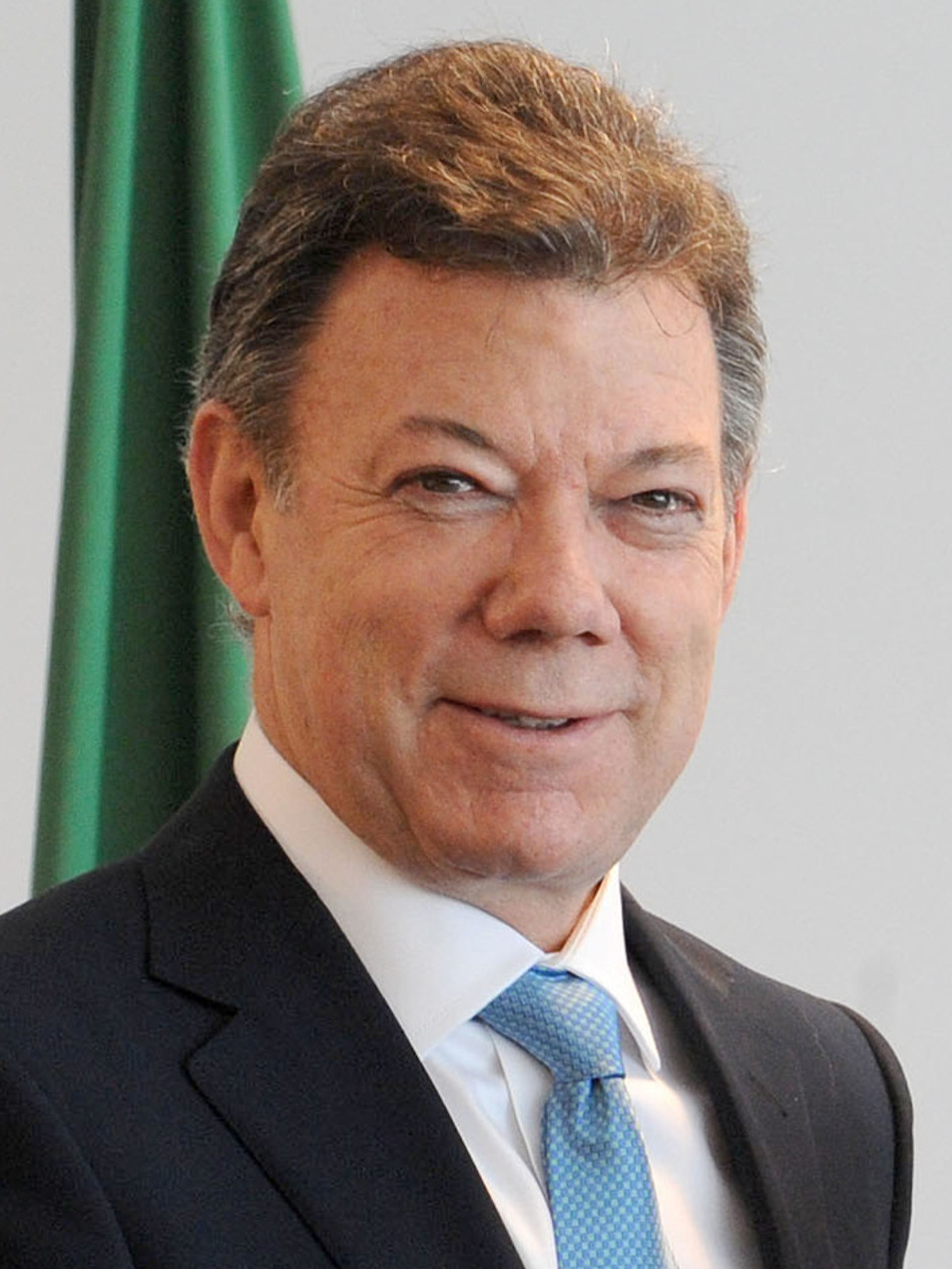
- Antonia Santos Eduardo Santos Francisco Santos Juan Manuel Santos
- Current region: Bogotá, D.C.
- Origin: Santander; Cádiz
- Titles: List: President of Colombia; First Lady of Colombia; Vice President of Colombia; Second Lady of Colombia; Colombian Ambassador (to the United States); Senator; Colombian Congressman (from Bogotá)
- Connected families: Galvis family Calderón family Reyes family Montejo family Lleras family Urdaneta family

The Santos family is a Colombian political family that has played a prominent role in Colombian politics since the 1930s, primarily as the first family of Colombia from 1938 to 1942 and from 2010 to 2018, during the presidencies of Eduardo Santos and Juan Manuel Santos, respectively. They also played a prominent role in Colombian diplomacy, art, journalism, and business. They were also the second family of the Colombia from 2002 to 2010, when Francisco Santos was vice president. The Santos family is one of five families to have produced two presidents of Colombia by the same surname; the others were the López, Holguín, Ospina and Lleras families.

Known for their political involvement, their relatives have held various national and state positions over four generations, including ambassador to Colombia (Vice President Francisco Santos; President Eduardo Santos; and Juan Manuel Santos). Other relatives include independence heroine Antonia Santos; journalists Rafael and Alejandro Santos; and lawyer Gabriel Santos.

The Santos family is primarily of Spanish descent. Their European origins date back to the 18th century, with Ysidoro Manuel Santos being their first ancestor born in Colombia, in 1647. The Santos family originated in Cádiz through settlers who arrived in Colombia, settling in Santander.

== Relatives ==
- Juan Santos, father of Ysidoro Manuel Santos
  - Ysidoro Manuel Santos, father of Pedro Santos
    - Pedro Santos, father of Antonia Santos
      - Antonia Santos
      - José María Santos, father of Francisco Santos Galvís
        - Francisco Santos Galvís (1848–1900), José María Santos's son
        - Leopoldina Montejo (1850–1905), wife of Francisco Santos Galvís
          - Hernando Santos Montejo (1883–1921)
          - Eduardo Santos Montejo (1888–1974)
          - Lorenza Villegas de Santos (1899–1960), wife of Eduardo Santos Montejo, First Lady
          - Enrique Santos Montejo (1886–1971)
          - Noemí Castillo, first wife of Enrique Santos Montejo
          - Blanca Molano, second wife of Enrique Santos Montejo
            - Enrique Santos Castillo (1917–2001)
            - Clemencia Calderón de Santos (1922–2000), wife of Enrique Santos Castillo and sister of Helena Calderón Nieto
              - Juan Manuel Santos (born 1951), Enrique Santos Castillo's eldest son; 33rd president of Colombia, Minister of National Defence, Minister of Finance and Public Credit and Minister of Foreign Trade
              - María Clemencia Rodríguez de Santos (born 1961), wife of Juan Manuel Santos, First Lady
                - Martín Santos
                - María Antonia Santos
                - Estaban Santos (born 1993), Juan Manuel Santos's youngest son
                - Gabriela Tafur (born 1995), wife of Esteban Santos
              - Enrique Santos Calderón (born 1945)
              - Luis Fernando Santos (born 1948)
              - Felipe Santos Calderón
            - Hernando Santos Castillo (1922–1999)
            - Helena Calderón de Santos (1922–1983), wife of Hernando Santos Castillo and sister of Clemencia Calderón de Santos
              - Francisco Santos Calderón (born 1961), Hernando Santos Castillo's eldest son; 8th Vice President of Colombia and Colombian Ambassador to the United States
              - María Victoria García de Santos (born 1963), wife of Francisco Santos Calderón, Second Lady
                - Gabriel Santos (born 1990), Francisco Santos Calderón's eldest son Member of the Chamber of Representatives
                - María Claudia Naranjo, wife of Gabriel Santos; eldest daughter of Óscar Naranjo 11th Vice President of Colombia
                - Benjamín Santos
                - Pedro Santos
                - Carmen Santos
              - Rafael Santos Calderón (born 1954), Hernando Santos Castillo's youngest son
              - Luisa Fernanda Rodríguez, wife of Hernando Santos Castillo
                - Lina María Santos Merchán
                - Santiago Santos Merchán
                - Andrés Santos Merchán
                - Diego Santos Caballero
                - Pablo Santos Rodríguez
            - Beatriz Santos Castillo
            - Cecilia Santos Castillo
            - Enrique Santos Molano
            - Consuelo Santos Molano
            - Pilar Santos Molano
          - Guillermo Santos Montejo (1892–1967)
          - Gustavo Santos Montejo (1894–1961)

== See also ==
- List of presidents of Colombia
- Political families of the world
