= Aída Merlano =

Colombian politician

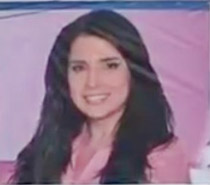

Member of the Chamber of Representatives of Colombia
- In office 20 July 2014 – 3 March 2018
- Constituency: Atlántico Department

Member of the Department Assembly of Atlántico
- In office 2011–2014

Personal details
- Born: Aída Merlano Rebolledo; 21 December 1980 (age 45) Barranquilla, Colombia
- Party: Conservative
- Education: Free University of Colombia

Aída Merlano Rebolledo (born 21 December 1980) is a Colombian politician.

She was a member of the country's Chamber of Representatives for the Conservative Party for the 2014–2018 legislative term.

In September 2019, she was convicted of conspiracy, weapons possession, and electoral crimes in connection with her campaign for senator. On 1 October 2019, Merlano escaped from her guards while attending a dental appointment. On 27 January 2020, she was recaptured in Maracaibo by Venezuelan authorities.

== Early life and political career ==
Aída Merlano was born in Barranquilla on 21 December 1980. She took an interest in politics during childhood, making her debut as a civil leader in her hometown in 1991. She studied law at the Free University (though the newspaper El País later found that she never held a law licence). She served as a member of the Department Assembly of Atlántico from 2011 until her resignation in 2014.

In 2014, she was elected as a member of the Chamber of Representatives of Colombia for Atlántico Department, serving until 2018.

== Conviction for electoral crimes ==
Merlano won a seat in the Senate of Colombia for the Conservative Party in the March 2018 parliamentary election. However, irregularities quickly surfaced. Officials from the Directorate of Criminal Investigation and Interpol raided her campaign headquarters a few days after the election, and found evidence of a "sophisticated voter buying network" in which payments of 45,000 pesos (US$14) were made to individual voters and tracked using QR codes. Five campaign workers were arrested, and computers, cash, and four firearms were seized. The Attorney General's Office asked the National Electoral Council to suspend Merlano's appointment as senator.

On 19 April, she was detained in El Buen Pastor Prison in Bogotá for the crimes of corruption of the electorate, conspiracy, weapons possession, and illicit possession of ID cards. On 4 September, the Council of State declared her loss of investiture as senator, finding that she had spent 1.73 billion pesos (US$527,000) during the campaign, which far exceeded the limit of 884 million.

The Supreme Court sentenced her to 15 years in prison in September 2019.

== Escape and recapture ==
On 1 October 2019, Merlano escaped from Colombian authorities. She had an appointment with the dentist at La Sabana Medical Center, located north of Bogotá, in the morning, where she was transferred, accompanied by a guardian. At 3:00 pm, the administration of the medical center was informed of her absence. According to a video issued by the National Penitentiary and Prison Institute, Merlano descended from the third floor of the center by means of a rope tied to a table, riding away on a motorcycle driven by a man wearing badges for the home services company Rappi. This incident was widely covered in the media, and was described as a "movie escape". The Colombian government established a reward of 200 million pesos (US$60,000) for information leading to her capture.

On 27 January 2020, Merlano was captured in Maracaibo, Zulia State by Special Action Forces of the Venezuelan National Police, along with her romantic partner Yeico Manuel Vargas Silvera. Due to the position of the Colombian government on the presidential crisis in Venezuela, the request for Merlano's extradition was made by the Colombian Ministry of Justice to Juan Guaidó, and not to the government of Nicolás Maduro. As the latter was in control of the country's justice system, this left Merlano's fate unclear.
