= Pey family =

- Country: Colombia
- Origin: Spain
- Founder: Juan Francisco Pey y Ruiz
- Final ruler: José Miguel Pey
- Connected families: Andrade family Bastidas family Ruiz family Insinillas family

The Pey family was a distinguished family with Spanish origins. Family members were judges, mayors, and a president, the first Creole to exercise executive power in New Granada. During the nineteenth century many family clans gain influence through relationship with the state and administrative positions. New Granada's Independence was led mostly by elite creoles or criollos and various high-ranking colonial bureaucrats and their upper-status families, one of this families were the Peys.

They exercised wide influence on the clergy of New Granada, fostering in them the pro-independence patriotic sentiment.

== Surname ==
Old surname, infrequent and registered mainly in the province of Barcelona, its presence being notable in those of Girona and Madrid.

== Notable members ==
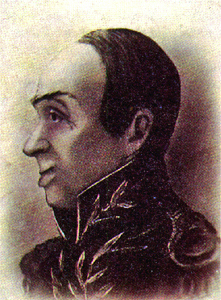
Portrait of first President of Colombia José Miguel Pey

- Juan Francisco Pey was an oidor of the Audiencia of Santa Fe de Bogotá, one of the most important positions at the time.
- President José Miguel Pey de Andrade was President of Colombia, Vice president of the Supreme Governing Junta in 1810 and a member of the Executive Presidium of the Republic of Colombia.
- Juan Bautista Pey Archdeacon of the Primate Cathedral of Colombia
