= Luis de Ayala y Vergara =

Colombian lawyer and politician (1768–1839)

Governor President of the State of Cundinamarca President of the United Provinces of New Granada
- In office June 25, 1812 – August 5, 1812 Co-leading with Manuel Benito de Castro
- Preceded by: Antonio Nariño
- Succeeded by: Antonio Nariño

State Councilor
- In office 1812

Royal Administrator of Tobacco & Aguardiente

Personal details
- Born: February 19, 1768 Bogotá, New Kingdom of Granada
- Died: April 26, 1839 (aged 71) Bogotá, Republic of New Granada
- Spouse: Maria Teresa Lozano Isazi
- Education: Del Rosario University
- Occupation: Lawyer, administrator
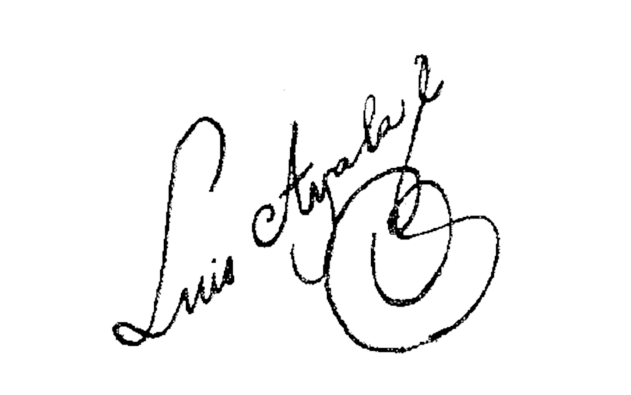
- Signature

Luis de Ayala y Vergara (February 19, 1768 – April 26, 1839) was a criollo lawyer, politician from the capital of the Viceroyalty of the New Granada. During the South American independence he exercised the executive power as State Councilor of the Free and Independent State of Cundinamarca in 1812, due to the absence of President Antonio Nariño. Ayala y Vergara is considered one of the first heads of state of the young Colombia.

== Biography ==
He was the son of a treasurer of the cajas reales Antonio de Ayala y Tamayo and Josefa Vergara Azcárate y Caycedo. Born into a renowned family, considered aristocracy and a bureaucratic Dynasty in the 18th-century.

On his father's side, they were members of an honorable family descended from secretaries of the Royal Archive of Simancas, a title granted by Felipe II and carried by several generations.
On his mother's side, his uncle was the President Felipe de Vergara Azcárate y Caycedo, his cousin was President Estanislao Vergara Azcarate y Sanz de Santamaría and he was the uncle of President José Gregorio Ignacio Gutierrez Vergara. Maria Josefa de Vergara Azcárate y Caycedo is descendant of Navarrese nobility and important houses of the Basque Country, more specifically from the town of Bergara in the province of Gipuzkoa, Spain.

He married Maria Teresa Lozano Isazi, daughter of José María Lozano de Peralta, the II Marquis of San Jorge.

Luis was brother of one of the main officers who had risen up against Nariño, José de Ayala y Vergara who was shot in public display in 1816 by the Spanish Empire, for his love and services to the new Republic, the same year of 1816.

Before the revolution he worked in different treasury position such as accountant of the royal rent of Aguardiente, gunpowder and Tobacco. in 1801 joined the Sociedad Patriotica or Patriotic society; a group of the wealthiest families of the new kingdom created to promote the wellbeing of its citizens, from here Luis started participating in the Independence efforts.

As elector, a member of an electoral college of Cundinamarca for El Espinal Signed the definitive act of independence of Cundinamarca on July 18, 1813

Ayala was also senior accountant of the superior court of accounts.
