= Gabriel Gómez de Sandoval y Arraita =

Spanish sergeant major (1647-1700)

Personal details
- Born: September 23, 1647 Spain
- Died: 1700, New Kingdom of Granada
- Spouse: María Josefa Cortés de Mesa Maldonado
- Children: Úrsula de Vergara Azcárate Gómez de Sandoval y Mesa
- Parent(s): Count of Lerma Juan Gómez de Sandoval & Maria Goméz de Arratia

Military service
- Allegiance: Spanish Empire
- Branch/service: Army
- Rank: Sergeant Major

Gabriel Gómez de Sandoval y Arratia was a sergeant major of the Spanish Royal Army during the 17th-century. Gómez commissioned the Chapel of the Tabernacle (Capilla del Sagrario) of Bogotá, The chapel was built between 1660 and 1700 during the reign of Philip the fourth of Spain. It predates the Primatial Cathedral by well over 100 years, and Gómez de Sandoval oversaw the entire project. He died shortly after it was consecrated in 1700.

The Chapel of the Tabernacle (Capilla del Sagrario) is an independent building connected to the Cathedral of Bogotá. It is located on Plaza de Bolívar in La Candelaria.

== Biography ==
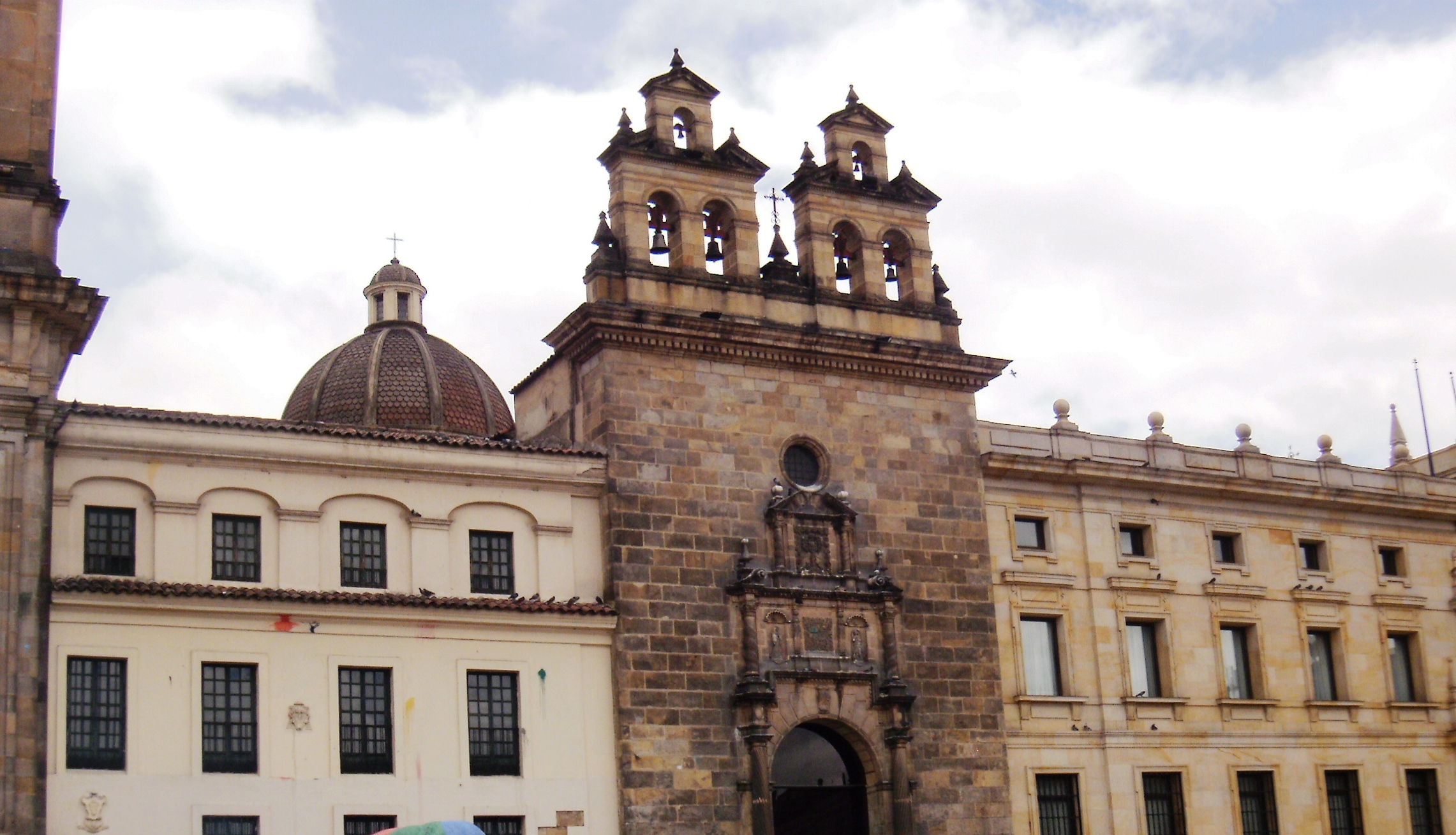
Tabernacle Chapel of the Metropolitan Basilica Cathedral of Bogotá, Colombian monument build by Gómez de Sandoval

He was the son of D. Juan González de Sandoval, Governor of the State of the Admiral of Castilla in Sicily, and Guest of the Infante Cardenal D. Fernando.

The sergeant major Gabriel Gómez de Sandoval, a native of the town and court of Madrid, made a career in Bogotá, where he began to build the Sagrario chapel in 1656. The sumptuousness with which the building was built, made possible by a great economic waste, led to the glowing praise of locals and strangers. Sandoval thus became a true hero within the society of Santa Fe.

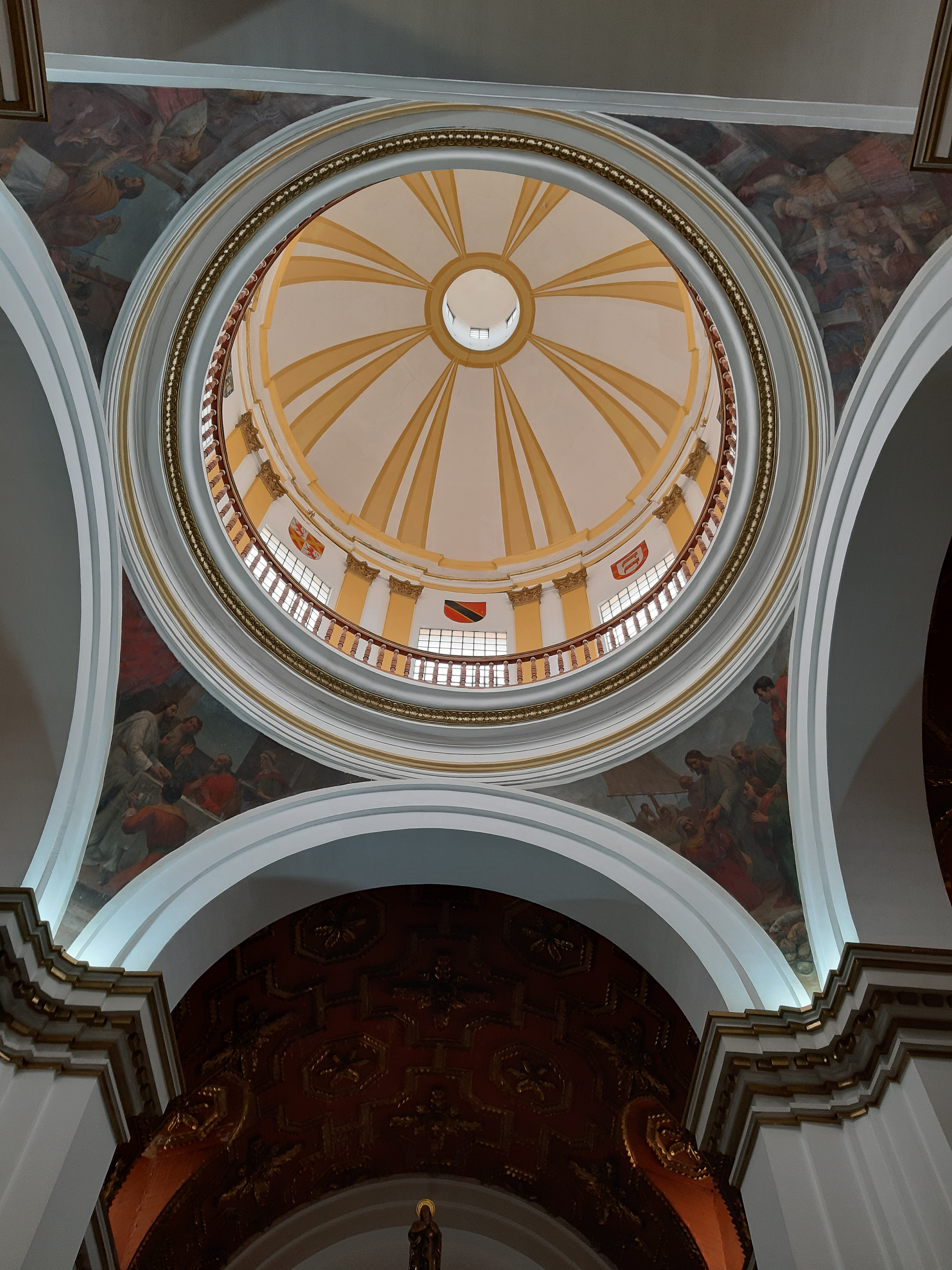
Dome of the Capilla del Sagrario, Bogotá, Colombia. On top family coat of arms

There one of the most representative collections of the work of the Santa Fe painter Gregorio Vásquez de Arce y Ceballos, who made a large number of works for the ornamentation of the temple, is preserved. He made more than fifty paintings to decorate the chapel (of which thirty-six are preserved), commissioned by Gómez de Sandoval. Among them stand out: The Evangelists; The Last Supper (with 25 larger-than-life figures); Biblical scenes; The mystical betrothal of Saint Catherine, etc.

On August 15, 1819, the army headed by the liberator Simón Bolívar was received in the Chapel of the Tabernacle with the singing of the Te Deum and a solemn mass in gratitude for the victory in the Battle of Boyacá.
