= Ignacio Gutierrez Vergara =

19th century Colombian Politician, Journalist and President of Colombia

His Excellency Ignacio Gutiérrez Vergara
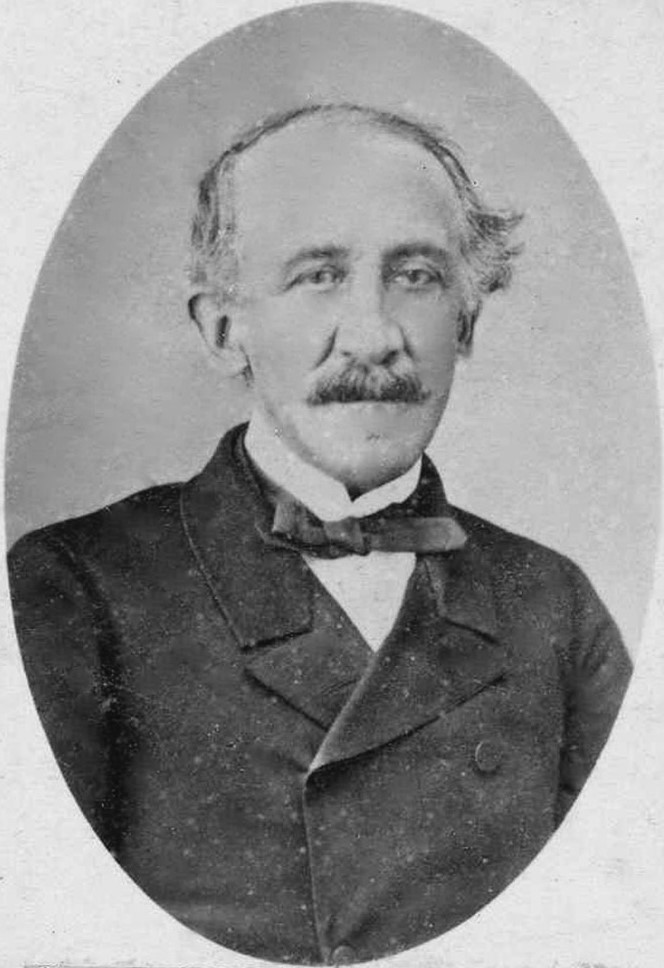

Designated President of the Grenadine Confederation
- In office July 18, 1861 – January 25, 1862
- Preceded by: Bartolomé Calvo
- Succeeded by: Tomas Cipriano de Mosquera

President of the Sovereign State of Cundinamarca
- In office January 1, 1868 – October 9, 1868
- Preceded by: Daniel Aldana Cárdenas
- Succeeded by: Rudescindo López Delgadillo

Secretary of Treasury of the Grenadine Confederation
- In office July 21, 1857 – July 18, 1861
- Preceded by: Jorge Juan Hoyos
- Succeeded by: Rufino Cuervo y Barreto

Personal details
- Born: July 30, 1806 Santa Fe de Bogotá, Viceroyalty of New Granada, Spanish Empire
- Died: 3 November 1877 (age 71) Bogotá, Sovereign State of Cundinamarca, United States of Colombia
- Party: Conservative Party
- Occupation: Politician, journalist, military

Military service
- Battles/wars: Colombian Civil War (1860–1862); Capture of Bogotá (1861) – Constitutional government official; did not command troops; 1868 Cundinamarca political crisis; Attempted mobilization of armed forces against the national government

José Gregorio Ignacio Gutiérrez Vergara Azcárate (Bogotá, July 30, 1806– Bogotá, November 3, 1877) was a Colombian politician and journalist, who served as Designated President of Colombia in 1861, during the War of Sovereignties. He was also Secretary (Minister) of Finance and President (Governor) of the Sovereign State of Cundinamarca.

== Biography ==
He was born in Bogotá in 1806, when it was still the capital of the Viceroyalty of New Granada, son of José Gregorio Martín Juan Gutiérrez Moreno and Antonia Vergara Sanz de Santamaría, sister of Estanislao Vergara y Sanz de Santamaría, for which Gutiérrez Vergara was a nephew. of the also president. He began his work in the public sector when in 1831 was commissioned to write El Constitucional, of Cundinamarca, by appointment of President José María Obando.

In the journalistic field he was a collaborator of Archbishop Manuel José Mosquera in the writing of the newspaper El Catolicismo, in addition to founding La Unidad Católica in 1869. He was also a collaborator of the newspapers El Argos, El Observador 1837–1840), El Día, La Civilización, La Republic, The Public Good and The Traditionalist. He was the author of numerous papers on economics. Gutierrez published El hombre de bien in 1841. This included sections on "moral thoughts on work" "domestic economy: duties of the husband and wife", "Physical education in infancy", "Professors of art and crafts".

Between 1839 and 1840 he was acting Director General of Public Instruction (Minister of Education), under the government of José Ignacio Márquez. In 1842 he was appointed Secretary of the Treasury commissioned by President Pedro Alcántara Herrán. Also during the Herrán administration he was general director of tobacco revenues, a position he held from 1843 to 1848.

In 1857 was again appointed as Secretary of Treasury, under the administration of Mariano Ospina Rodríguez. In 1860 the War of the Sovereignties broke out as a liberal rebellion against the Ospina government, and on July 18, 1861, the government was overthrown and Bogotá occupied by the rebel forces of Tomás Cipriano de Mosquera. In this situation, Gutiérrez fled and hid in the French embassy, the place where he assumed the Headship of State, in accordance with the 1858 Constitution, being the oldest minister. He left the embassy on the night of July 30, disguised as a craftsman, to the old house of his grandfather, Pantaleon Gutiérrez. Mosquera began the persecution of him, trying by different means to capture him, from seizing their assets to offering him a bribe. On one occasion Mosquera sent him to say that 'although as provisional president he had ordered him to be arrested and shot, as a friend and relative he offered him a safe asylum in his home', to which Gutiérrez replied: I do not doubt the sincerity of the gentleman; but two wardens cannot live in the same fortress.

Finally, on January 18, 1861, he fled to a new hideout, but fell through a wall and broke his leg. Despite this, was transferred to a new house, that of Magdalena Caicedo, where on January 25 he was arrested after someone betrayed him. On January 26, he was transferred to the San Agustín barracks, where Mosquera offered to pardon him in exchange for abandoning his presidential claims; Gutiérrez rejected the offer and replied: 'The duties are not waived.' On two occasions Mosquera ordered his execution, but he ended up being pardoned.

As a conservative was elected governor of Cundinamarca in 1867. In 1868 became president of the Sovereign State of Cundinamarca, a position in which he tried on August 9, 1868, to carry out a coup against President José Santos Gutiérrez. The conspiracy was dismantled by General Daniel Delgado París, who pressed for his resignation. Gutiérrez finally resigned on October 8, 1868, and died in his hometown in November 1877.
