= Arboleda family =

Colombian family

Arboleda
- Aristocracy and political family
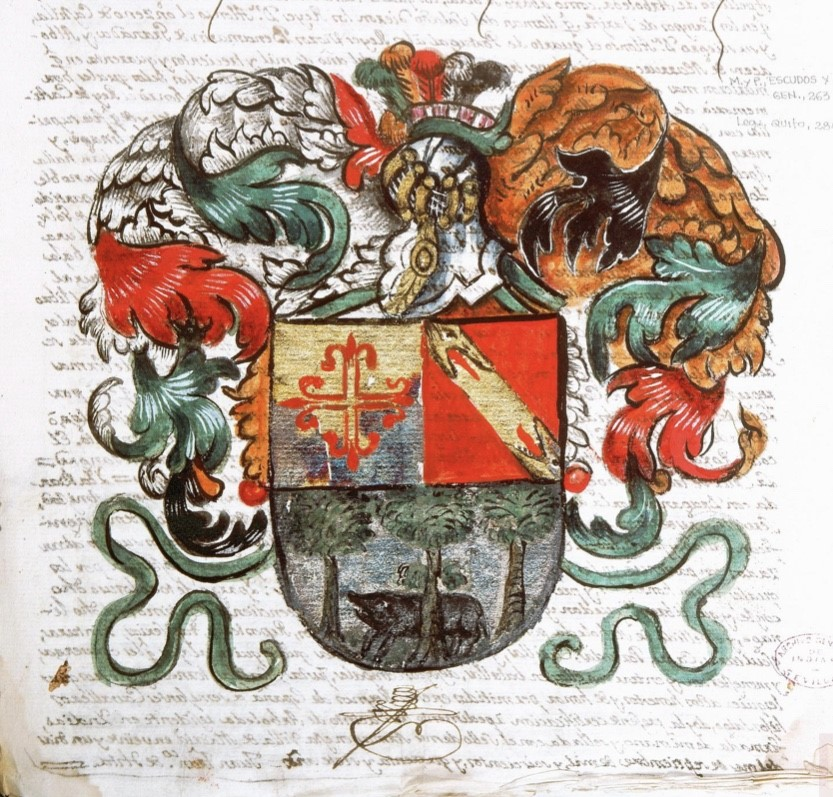
- Coat of arms of the Arboleda surname granted by King Philip IV to Jacinto de Arboleda y Ortiz (General Archive of the Indies, Seville, Spain)

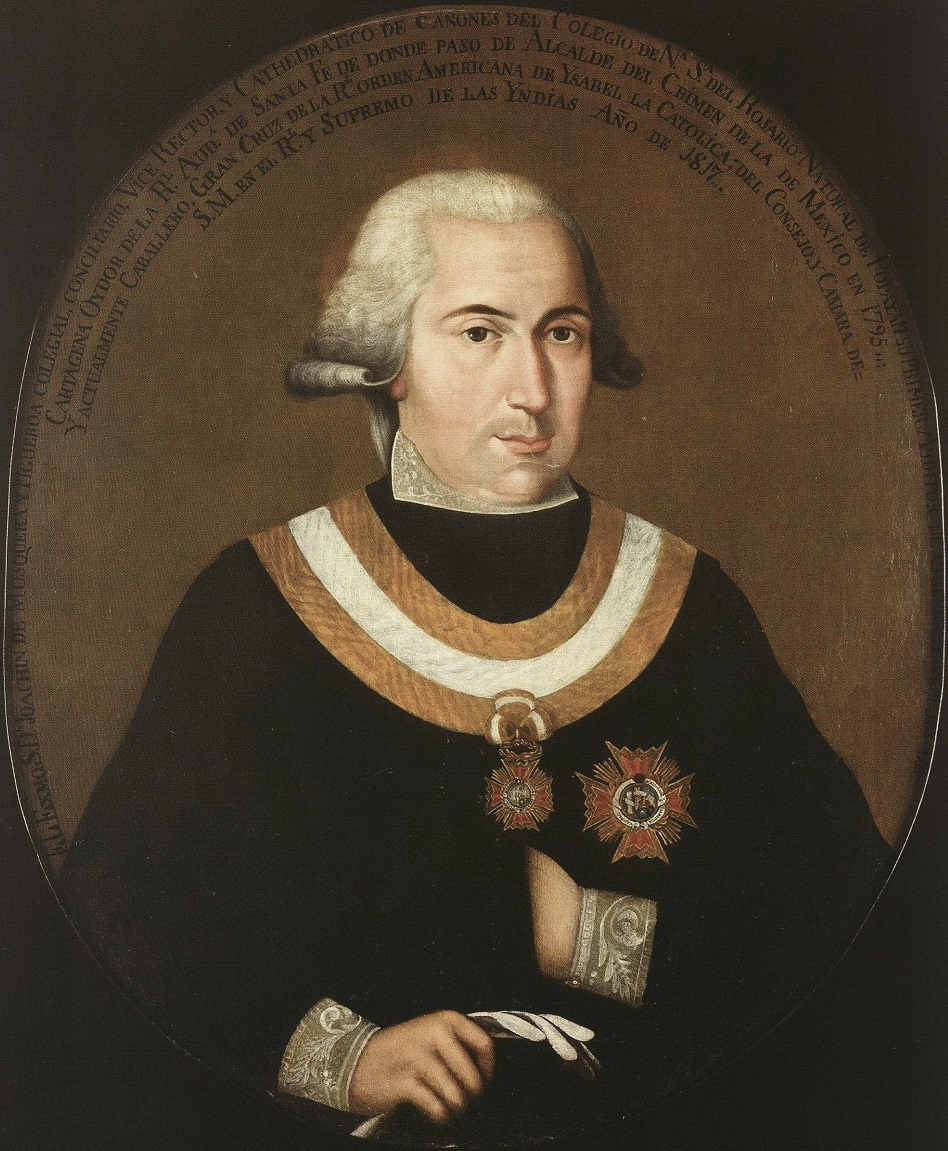
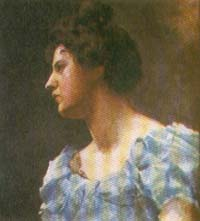
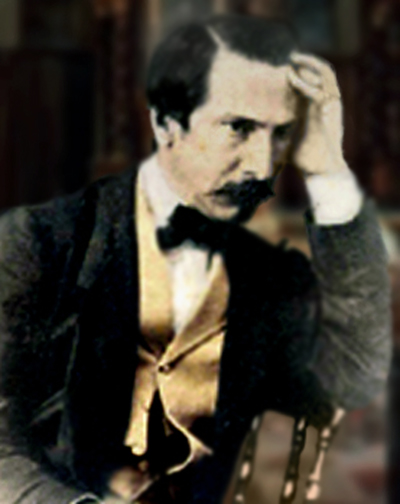
- Joaquín Mosquera Cecilia Arboleda Mosquera Julio Arboleda Pombo
- Current region: Spain, Colombia, United States
- Earlier spellings: Arboleya in Asturian
- Origin: Arboleya, Asturias, Spain
- Founded: (1605–1671)
- Connected families: Arroyo family Holguín family Mosquera family Pombo family Valencia Family; Vergara family
- Traditions: Roman Catholicism
- Estate: Arboleda historic house in Popayán

The Arboleda family is Colombian political and aristrocratic family originally from the city of Popayán, which had its period of greatest influence between the 17th and 20th centuries in the South American country and whose origins date back to the Arboleya region in Asturias, Spain.

Among its numerous and influential members are poets, businessmen, writers, musicians and politicians, including three presidents of Colombia and a fourth president associated with the family by marriage ties.

== Origin ==
The common trunk of the Arboleda tree comes from a French constable who fought against the Moors and participated in the Battle of Las Navas de Tolosa in 1212.

In 1647, King Philip IV of Spain granted the coat of arms to Captain Jacinto de Arboleda y Ortiz, a native of Granada, the first member of this family to start lineage in the Americas, after initially settling in Anserma, Caldas and later in Popayán, a city to which the family has been historically linked ever since.

== Important locations ==
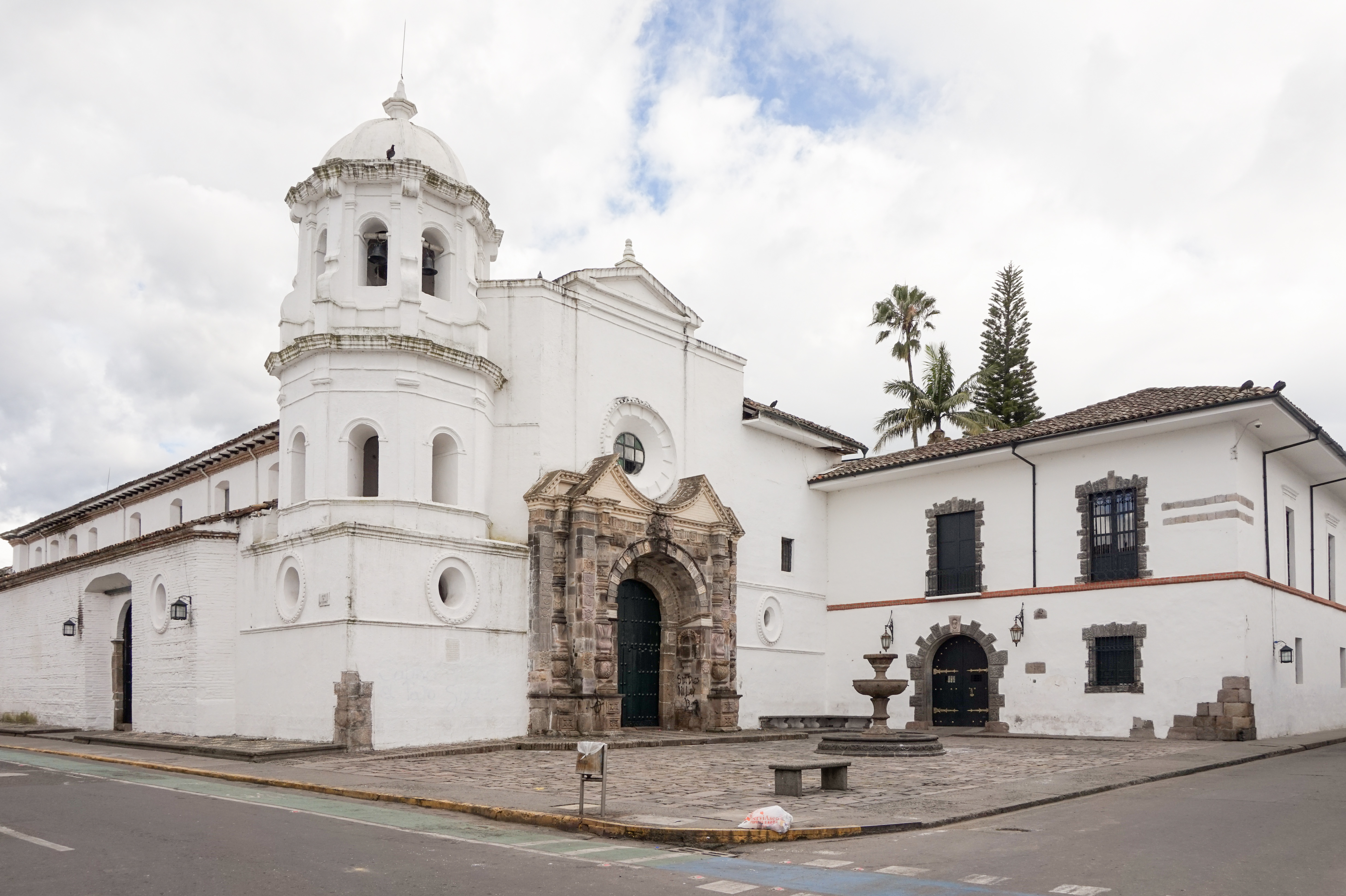
Church of Santo Domingo, Popayán

Some of the places most closely linked to the history of the family are the Church of Santo Domingo in Popayán, whose construction and endowment was carried out at the initiative of the Arboleda family, specifically from the brothers Pedro and Francisco Arboleda y Salazar in 1694. Their descendants helped with upkeep.

Another noteworthy location is the Japio Estate, located between Caloto and Santander de Quilichao, acquired by the family at a public auction after the Suppression of the Society of Jesus in 1767. Currently, the estate is home to livestock, crops, and a business center.

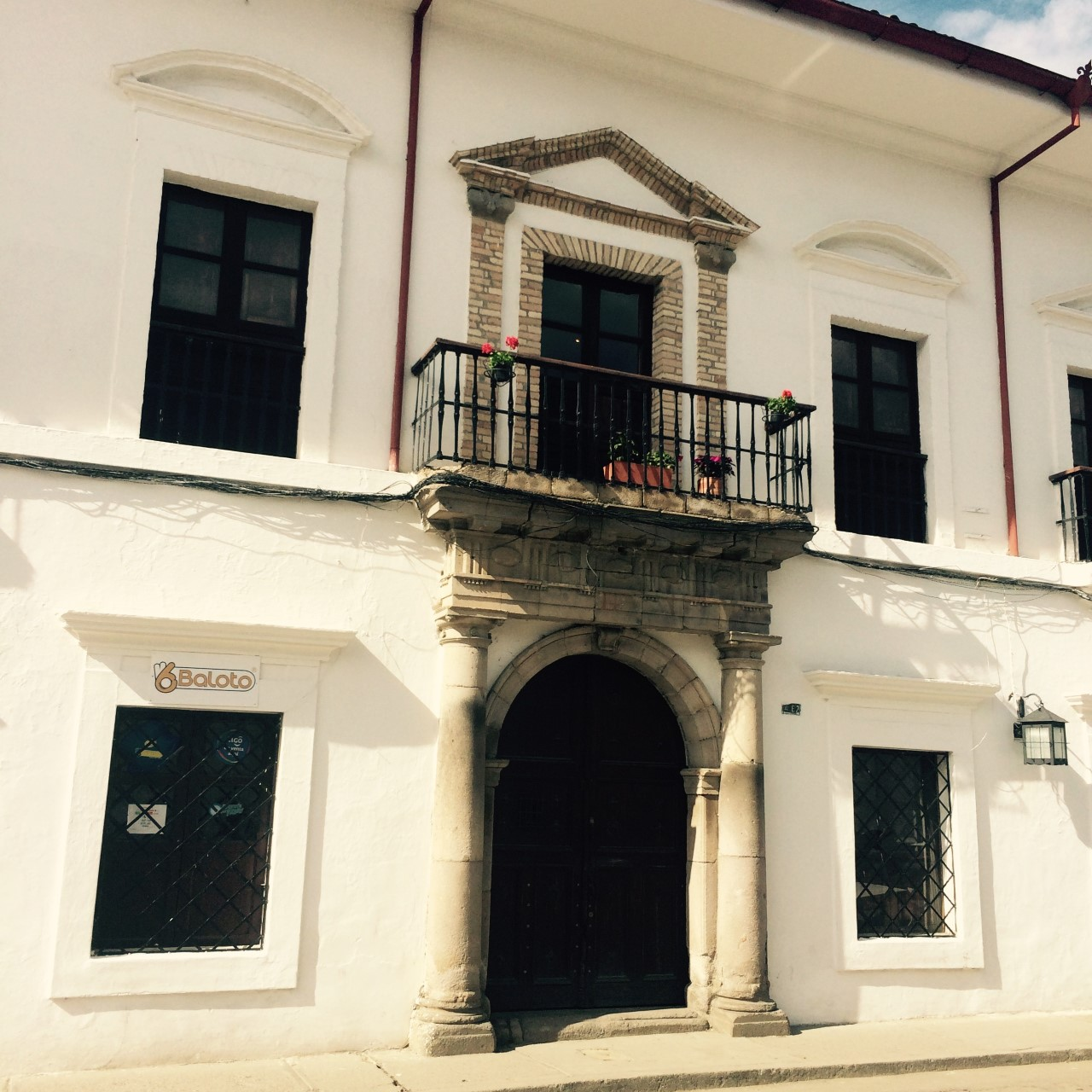
Popayán Archdiocesan Museum of Religious Art

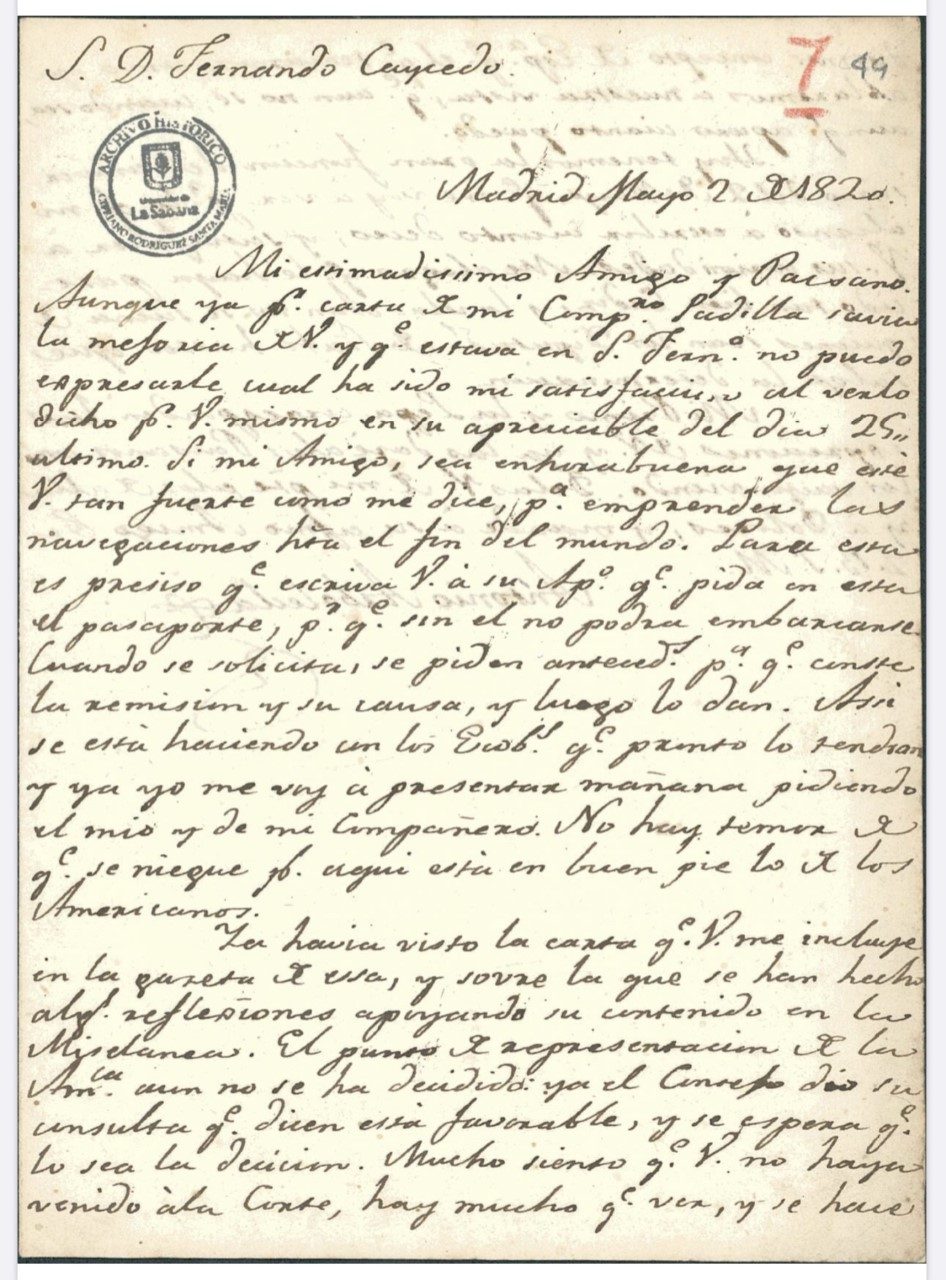
Letter from the Independence fighter Antonio Arboleda y Arrachea addressed from his exile in Madrid to the priest Fernando Caicedo y Flórez, in 1820. (Cipriano Rodríguez Santamaría Historical Archive, University of La Sabana, Chía).

Another property linked to the history of the family is the manor house that belonged to Julián Arboleda Arrachea and Gabriela Pérez de Arroyo y Valencia. It was acquired in the 20th century by the Curia of Popayán. The stately residence was designed by Marcelino Pérez de Arroyo in the second half of the 18th century and was adapted as the headquarters of the Popayán Archdiocesan Museum of Religious Art in 1977. It was declared a National Monuments of Colombia in 1996.

== Historical heritage ==
Most of the extensive documentary collection belonging to the Arboleda family is preserved in the historical archives of several Colombian universities including the University of Cauca, Pontifical Xavierian University, and the University of La Sabana.

Other familial documents are kept in the Luis Ángel Arango Library and the National Library of Colombia in Bogotá. They have been donated over the years by family members Esmeralda Arboleda Cadavid and Andrés Caicedo.

The Venezuelan leader Simón Bolívar, known as The Liberator of America, gave the wedding ring of his wife, María Teresa Rodríguez del Toro y Alaysa (who died 8 months after their wedding) to his friends José Rafael Arboleda Arroyo and Matilde Pombo O'Donnell, the parents of Granadine Confederation President Julio Arboleda Pombo, on his way through Popayán and after staying at the Japio Estate.

== Notable members ==
Several members of the Arboleda family have stood out in the national life of Colombia, including presidents historically associated with the Colombian Conservative Party and the city of Popayán.

=== Presidents ===
Presidents of Colombia in the Arboleda family
Photo	Name	Title	Took office	Left office
	Joaquín Mosquera (1787–1878)	3rd President of Gran Colombia5th President of Gran Colombia	1830 1831	1830 1831
	Tomás Cipriano de Mosquera (1798–1878)	4th President of the Republic of New Granada 3rd President of the Granadine Confederation 1st President of the United States of Colombia4th President of the United States of Colombia	1845 1861 1863 1866	1849 1863 1864 1867
	Julio Arboleda Pombo (1817–1863)	2nd President of the Granadine Confederation Acting President of the Republic of New Granada	1861 1857	1861 1859
	Jorge Holguín (1848–1928; through marriage to Cecilia Arboleda)	10th President of Colombia	1921	1922

=== Other members ===
Other members cover a wide spectrum of professions, with a considerable number of public figures, lawyers, intellectuals, priests and statesmen. Its most notable members include (in chronological order from the 17th century to the present):

- Jacinto de Arboleda y Ortiz (1605–1671), Spanish politician and soldier, ordinary mayor of Anserma, private judge and captain
- Joaquín de Mosquera Figueroa y Arboleda (1748–1830), Spanish politician, military officer and regent, married to María Teresa Arboleda
- Antonio Arboleda y Arrachea (1770–1825), lawyer from New Granada, abolitionist and hero of the Independence of Colombia
- Manuel María Mosquera y Arboleda (1800–1882), Colombian politician and diplomat, Rector of the University of Cauca
- Manuel José Mosquera y Arboleda (1800–1853), Colombian Catholic Priest, Archbishop of Bogotá
- Sergio Arboleda Pombo (1822–1888), Colombian politician and writer, Rector of the University of Cauca
- Simón Arboleda Arboleda (1824–1883), Colombian politician, military officer and diplomat, Minister of the Interior
- Lubin Bonilla Arboleda (1866–1930), Colombian lawyer, professor, politician, and Director of the Center for Criminal Investigations, Bogota, Colombia.
- Manuel Antonio Arboleda Scarpetta (1870–1923), Colombian Vincentian priest and theologian, Archbishop of Popayán
- Francisco José Urrutia Olano (1870–1950), Colombian politician, diplomat and jurist, Minister of Foreign Affairs, married to Elena Holguín Arboleda.
- Gustavo Arboleda Restrepo (1881–1938), Colombian writer, diplomat, historian and genealogist
- José María Arboleda Llorente (1886–1969), Colombian historian, paleographer and archivist, creator of the Historical Research Center of the University of Cauca
- Rosa Cadavid Medina (1899–1996), Colombian florist, patron, and socialite
- Miguel Antonio Arroyo Arboleda (1900–1966), Colombian writer, historian and politician, Mayor of Popayán
- Manuel Antonio Arboleda Arboleda (1905–1936), Colombian politician and intellectual
- José Rafael Arboleda Cabrera (1916–1992), Colombian Jesuit priest and anthropologist, member of the Colombian Academy of History, pioneer of library science in Colombia
- Diego Castrillón Arboleda (1920–2009), Colombian historian, writer and professor, member of the Colombian Academy of History and the Colombian Academy of Language
- Fernando Arboleda López, Colombian politician and firefighter, Commander of the Popayán Volunteer Fire Department, Mayor of Popayán
- Esmeralda Arboleda Cadavid (1921–1997), Colombian politician and suffragist, pioneer of women's rights, first female Senator of Colombia
- Julio Arboleda Valencia (1922–2020), Colombian politician and intellectual, Governor of Valle del Cauca Department
- Violeta Arboleda (1926–2018), Colombian-American periodontist, wife of fellow periodontist Irving Glickman
- Mireya Arboleda (1928–2021), Colombian classical pianist
- Soffy Arboleda de Vega (1930–2018), Colombian musician, art historian, collector, gastronome, philanthropist and cultural manager.
- Norman Maurice Armitage (b. 1945), Colombian businessman, politician, and philanthropist, former Mayor of Cali
- Carlos Felipe Castrillón Muñoz (b. 1950), VI Marquess of San Juan de Rivera, lawyer and former Spanish diplomat
- Andrés Caicedo (1951–1977), Colombian writer, short story writer, screenwriter and literary critic
- Adriana Arboleda (b. 1978), Colombian model and fashion designer
