= Timeline of the COVID-19 pandemic in Colombia =

Timeline of the ongoing COVID-19 viral pandemic in Colombia

The following is a timeline of the COVID-19 pandemic in Colombia.

== Summary ==
The COVID-19 pandemic in Colombia was a part of the pandemic of coronavirus disease 2019 (COVID-19) caused by severe acute respiratory syndrome coronavirus 2 (SARS-CoV-2). The virus was confirmed to have reached Colombia on 6 March 2020.

Up to January 2022, four waves affected Colombia: Infections and deaths peaked in August 2020, again in January 2021 following the Christmas holidays, reached new highs between April and June 2021, and a fourth wave was confirmed in late December 2021 following the arrival of the Omicron variant of SARS-CoV-2.

"Confirmed COVID-19" was the primary cause of death in Colombia in 2020, where the virus caused over 50,000 fatalities by the end of the calendar year. An additional 13,000 deaths in Colombia that year were suspected to be caused by COVID-19, making "suspected COVID-19" the third most common cause of death. The "confirmed COVID-19" death toll doubled during the first half of 2021, reaching 100,000 before the end of June (including all deaths from the beginning of the pandemic).

== Timeline ==
Cases

Deaths

=== 2020 ===
==== March ====
On 6 March 2020, the Ministry of Health and Social Protection confirmed Colombia's first case of coronavirus, a 19-year-old female patient who had recently travelled to Milan, Italy.

On 9 March, two more cases were confirmed.

On 11 March, six more cases were confirmed, three in Medellín, two in Bogotá and one in Cartagena. Later on the same day, three more cases were confirmed, bringing the total to 9.

On 12 March, four more cases were confirmed, two in Bogotá and two in Neiva. Authorities declared a health emergency, suspending all public events involving more than 500 people, as well as implementing measures intended to keep cruise ships from docking in any national port.

On 13 March, three new cases were reported, one in Bogotá, one in Palmira and the other in Villavicencio. President Iván Duque announced that as of 16 March, entry to Colombia will be restricted for visitors who have been in Europe or Asia within the past 14 days. Colombian citizens and residents who have been in Europe or Asia can be admitted into the country, but must undergo a 14-day self-quarantine as a precaution.

Additionally, Duque announced Colombia would shut down all of its border crossings with Venezuela, effective as of 14 March. Associated Press reported that experts are worried that the Venezuelan refugee crisis could boost the spread of the virus.

On the night of 15 March, the Health Ministry announced 11 new cases, bringing the total up to 45. Of those 11, 6 were in Bogotá, 4 in Neiva and 1 in the town of Facatativá. Additionally, President Iván Duque, along with the Ministries of Health and Education, announced suspension of classes for all public and private schools and universities in the country.

On the morning of 16 March, nine new cases were reported in Bogotá. Later that same day, three additional cases were also reported in Bogotá, bringing the total to 57. President Iván Duque declared all land and sea borders be closed in conjunction with the governments of Ecuador, Peru and Brazil. Córdoba, Meta and Santander Departments issued curfews to avoid the spread of the virus.

On the morning of 17 March, Colombia's Health Ministry confirmed 8 more cases. Later the same day, they confirmed another 10 cases, bringing the total to 75. Cartagena's mayor extended the curfew, which previously applied only to the tourist city center from 10:00 p.m. to 4:00 am, to the whole city from 6:00 p.m. to 4:00 a.m. during weekdays, and for 24 hours during weekends. Bogotá mayor Claudia López, announced a mandatory isolation drill for the extended weekend, from 20 to 23 March. The Bogotá drill allowed exceptions for the elderly and disabled and delivery personnel to move around. Pet owners were authorized to take animals outside for 20 minutes and one person per family could leave to purchase supplies.

On 17 March, at 9:00 pm local time (UTC–5), President Iván Duque spoke to the Colombians and declared a state of emergency, announcing that he would take economic measures that were announced the following day. The first measure taken seeking the protection of the elderly was to decree mandatory isolation from 7:00 am on 20 March to 31 May for all adults over 70 years of age. They had to stay in their residences except to stock up on food or access health or financial services. Government entities were instructed to make it easier for them to receive their pensions, medicines, healthcare or food at home.

On the evening of 20 March, President Iván Duque announced a 19-day nationwide quarantine, starting on 24 March at midnight and ending on 12 April at midnight.

On 21 March, the Ministry of Health confirmed the first death from coronavirus in Colombia, a 58-year-old man who worked as a taxi driver in Cartagena who died on 16 March and reportedly carried Italian tourists on his taxi on 4 March. According to authorities, the person started presenting symptoms two days later. Initially, COVID-19 had been dismissed as the cause of his death as he had tested negative for coronavirus, however, his sister had tested positive for the disease. After the patient's decease, the National Health Institute (INS) analyzed two tests from him, both of which were negative with one of those being taken improperly, but decided to keep the investigation open owing to his sister's condition. Eventually, the INS concluded that the taxi driver was her only possible source of contagion, therefore attributing his death to the new virus in spite of the laboratory evidence stating otherwise.

On 22 March, the Ministry of Health confirmed the second death linked to the virus, a 70-year-old woman from Yumbo whose daughter had returned from Cuba on 2 March and reported to have had contact with two people from the United States, one of which had tested positive for coronavirus. In addition to this, 21 new cases were reported, bringing the total up to 231.

On 26 March, only 21 new positive cases were confirmed, which represented a decrease from previous days when over 90 positive cases were reported. According to the INS, this decrease was due to damage to the machine that prepared the samples for processing and subsequent diagnosis of COVID-19, which affected the speed at which results were being produced.

==== April ====
On 6 April, President Iván Duque announced in his daily broadcast an extension of the nationwide lockdown until 27 April to curtail further transmission of the coronavirus. During said broadcast Health Minister Fernando Ruíz revealed that infection numbers were lower than initially expected. While the country was expected to have over 5,700 cases by 4 April according to initial estimates, the actual number by that day was just over 1,400. At the same time it was announced that businesses affected by the lockdown would benefit from up to COP 12 trillion (US$2.9 billion) in credits.

On 9 April, Bogotá mayor Claudia López announced gender-based quarantine measures, known as Pico y género, to reduce circulation of the population. Under this rule, women can go out for essential tasks, like grocery shopping, on even-numbered days, while men can go out on odd-numbered days. The rule explicitly allows for self-designation of gender identity where it mentions the existence of transgender people; nonetheless, the rule has had a harmful impact on the transgender community. Informal workers who rely on daily labor for wages have also been harmed by the quarantine. In other departments and municipalities, transit-restriction measures such as Pico y cédula, which allow people to go out for essential tasks on specific days of the week according to the last digit of their ID (cédula) were implemented.

On 10 April, INPEC reported the first death of a prisoner by COVID-19: a 63-year-old man who had been held in the Villavicencio prison until 1 April and died six days later at the city's local hospital. The following day, a 78-year-old inmate at the same prison died as well and another one was confirmed to have tested positive for coronavirus, who would die on 17 April. That same day, 13 inmates and seven guards were reported to be active COVID-19 cases. By 23 April, the outbreak at Villavicencio prison was reported to have extended to 109 cases.

On 20 April, President Iván Duque announced a further extension of the nationwide lockdown until 11 May, but allowed the construction and manufacturing sectors to reopen starting from 27 April, under specific protocols. International and domestic commercial flights would remain suspended until the end of May, as would inter-municipal transport. On the other hand, public transport within cities was required to operate at a maximum of 35% capacity. Individual exercise was also allowed.

==== May ====
On 5 May, President Iván Duque announced a further extension of the nationwide lockdown for two weeks, until 25 May at midnight. He also announced that more economic sectors would be allowed to re-open under strict protocols starting from 11 May: automobile, furniture, and clothing manufacturing industries, wholesale trade and certain retailers such as laundries, bookstores and stationeries. Children aged 6–17 would be allowed to go outside three times a week for 30 minutes, with those aged 14 and under required to be accompanied by an adult who does not belong to a high-risk group (people over 70 years old or with underlying medical conditions). In addition to that, municipalities without confirmed COVID-19 cases would also be able to start re-opening their economic sectors, in coordination with mayors, governors and the national government. Bars, dine-in restaurants, gyms, and clubs would remain closed, and massive events would remain forbidden.

On 8 May, Bogotá mayor Claudia López announced new measures regarding the planned reactivation of the economy. All permitted construction works with safety protocols in place could resume by 11 May, working from 10 a.m. to 7 pm. Manufacturing companies with safety protocols in place could request permission to resume operations as early as 18 May, between 10 a.m and 5 a.m. (for this sector, which may have more than one work shift, business hours will depend on the size of the company), while wholesale traders and retailers may resume beginning 25 May, from noon to midnight. As the economic reactivation would make the pico y género measure unworkable, given that more people would need to leave their homes to go to work regardless of gender, this restriction was lifted on 11 May. An "orange alert" was declared for some neighborhoods in Kennedy, the locality with the most COVID-19 cases in the city. Residents of those sectors would be subject to a strict quarantine, only able to go out for essential tasks. Street sales and outside physical activity were prohibited in the area. These zones were to be monitored by health authorities for two weeks.

That same day, the National Health Institute reported 595 new confirmed cases on its daily report, raising the total of confirmed cases to 10,051. Bogotá was the region with the highest number of new cases, with 225. 21 new deaths were reported, raising the total to 228, and 2,424 people had recovered. Moreover, the institution reported that 4,387 tests were processed that day, and over 123,700 tests had been processed since the start of the outbreak in March.

With Mother's Day in Colombia being celebrated on the second Sunday of May (10 May in 2020) and given that the holiday is considered a critical one by authorities due to the high consumption of alcohol, gatherings and brawls, several departments and municipalities decreed curfews and prohibition of the sale and distribution of alcoholic beverages (ley seca) within their jurisdictions for the weekend between Friday night and Monday morning to prevent further spread of coronavirus as well.

On 14 May the National Government, through a decree issued by the Ministry of Interior, ordered the governor of the Amazonas Department as well as the mayor of Leticia the closure of every opened economic activity in the municipality and the department except for the ones strictly necessary for health, supply and essential services and declared a lockdown for that specific zone of the country until 30 May. This decision was reached due to the fast spread of coronavirus in the Amazonas Department since the confirmation of the first positive case in the department on 17 April, with 924 confirmed cases and 90 out of every 10,000 inhabitants being diagnosed with COVID-19. According to the reports by the INS, it was the highest rate in the country, ahead of Bogotá with 5.5 infected people per 10,000 inhabitants as of that day.

On 17 May, a humanitarian flight arrived in Colombia with 366 Colombian nationals. Due to travel restrictions, they had been stranded in other countries on four continents. Upon returning to Colombia, they were required to isolate for 14 days.

On 19 May, President Iván Duque announced a fourth extension of the national lockdown until 31 May, as well as the extension of the national health emergency until 31 August. Starting from 1 June, the country would enter a new stage in which reactivation of museums, libraries and domestic service activities would be evaluated, schools and universities were confirmed to continue under the modality of virtual education until August, when universities would be allowed to reopen under a model of alternation between classroom and virtual classes. People over 70 would have to remain isolated until 30 June.

On 23 May, the INS reported a total of 20,177 confirmed cases of COVID-19 and 1,046 new cases on its daily report, being this the first time the country reported over 1,000 infected people in 24 hours since the confirmation of the first case on 6 March.

On 28 May, a further extension of the national lockdown in place since March until 1 July was announced. At the same time, more businesses such as hairdressers and barbers, as well as malls would be allowed to reopen from 1 June, at the discretion of local mayors, while allowing more freedom of movement in some parts of the country. However, local authorities of cities with high rates of infection such as Bogotá, Cali (where an "orange alert" was declared), Barranquilla and Cartagena had already announced that movement restrictions would remain in place and reopening of economic activities would be delayed for at least two more weeks.

On 30 May, Bogotá mayor Claudia López announced a total lockdown for the Kennedy locality for two weeks starting from 1 June and extending to 14 June at midnight. The decision was reached given that the zone had over 2,000 positive cases for COVID-19, the highest number of cases in the city. All exemptions to leave the locality were rescinded, except for essential tasks. All economic sectors that had resumed activities in Kennedy were also suspended, as well as every outside physical activity.

==== June ====
On 2 June Colombia reported 40 new deaths, with which the country exceeded the figure of 1,000 deaths from COVID-19, reaching a total of 1,009. Up to that day, Bogotá reported the highest number of total deaths with 258. On the evening of that day, the Ministry of Education issued guidelines to regional and local education authorities as well as private schools and kindergartens stating that students would remain studying from home until 31 July, and inviting them to arrange for protocols for the gradual return of students to classrooms under a model of alternation starting from 1 August, in coordination with health authorities. This announcement was not well received by parents, who expressed their concerns over the health of their children. On 16 June, associations of private schools stated their intention to not return to classroom classes and finish the school year with virtual education.

In its daily report for 7 June, the Health Ministry confirmed the first positive case in the Guaviare Department, with which every department of Colombia has reported at least one case of COVID-19.

On 15 June, Bogotá mayor Claudia López declared an "orange alert" for the city's hospital system, considering that occupation of intensive care units in the city had surpassed 54%. The alert meant that, starting from 16 June, the District through its Regulatory Center for Urgencies and Emergencies (CRUE in Spanish) would officially take over administration and control of all ICU units in both public and private hospitals, and would refer COVID-19 patients requiring a unit to them according to proximity and availability criteria. López also announced the introduction of the Pico y cédula measure to control access to commercial and service establishments, such as banks, supermarkets, and notaries, as well as a two-week total lockdown for zones in the Ciudad Bolívar, Suba, Engativá, and Bosa localities. In Barranquilla, an "orange alert" with similar measures for the city's hospital system was declared by mayor Jaime Pumarejo due to the steady increase of positive cases in the city, which reported 798 new cases on 15 June, over twice the number of new cases recorded in Bogotá that day.

On 16 June, it became known that a group of twenty-five personalities over the age of 70, led by former Minister of Finance Rudolf Hommes, former Minister of Interior and Vice-president Humberto De la Calle, former Minister for Employment and acting mayor of Bogotá Clara López Obregón and politician Álvaro Leyva, as well as former mayor of Cali Maurice Armitage, nicknamed the Rebelión de las canas ("Gray hair rebellion"), lodged a tutelage action against the National Government as they considered their fundamental rights were being violated by the mobility restrictions set in place for the elderly population during the pandemic. They also argued they were being discriminated by the Government by being singled out as a special group and protecting them against their own will, thus negating their autonomy to make decisions regarding their own protection. In response to that, President Iván Duque stated that they were not being discriminated, and that the measures in place were aimed at taking care of them and protecting their lives.

On 21 June, the Health Ministry reported 111 deaths in the last 24 hours, being the first time Colombia recorded 100 daily deaths since the start of the pandemic. By that day, over half of the municipalities in the country (575 out of 1,122) had reported cases of COVID-19 compared to only 196 in April, meaning that each day six new municipalities were reporting positive cases. Five municipalities concentrated 65.2% of all positive cases: Bogotá, Barranquilla, Cartagena, Cali, and Soledad in the Atlántico Department, while that department as well as San Andrés had reported cases in all of their municipalities. On the other hand, 129 municipalities were already without active cases, those having either recovered or died. During the previous week, the pandemic had accelerated with the country reporting 10,000 cases in just four days, having taken two months to report that same amount at the start of the pandemic. Moreover, the case fatality rate per million inhabitants increased fourfold from 8 May, going from 9 to 39.

On 23 June, President Iván Duque announced a sixth extension of the nationwide lockdown until 15 July, with the same restrictions and exceptions that were in place up to that moment. The reopening of economic sectors would still be subject to the discretion of local authorities, while pilot programs to test the reopening of additional sectors such as restaurants and places of religious worship were announced to be held in municipalities with low numbers of coronavirus infections.

==== July ====
On 1 July the Ministry of Health reported 4,163 new cases out of 18,054 processed samples, with which Colombia exceeded the figure of 100,000 positive cases for COVID-19, reaching a total of 102,009. 136 deaths and 1,334 recoveries were also reported on that day, for a total of 3,470 and 43,407, respectively.

On 3 July it was revealed that a judge of Bogotá ruled in favour of the tutelage action lodged by the "Rebelión de las canas" group, ordering the Government to allow the elderly population to leave their homes for outdoor physical exercise two hours every day instead of an hour thrice a week as they were being allowed. In response to this ruling, President Iván Duque said that he would comply with the ruling, but exhorted the elderly population to stay at home on account of the evidence of the lethality of the virus in this segment of the population. Based on this, he announced that the Government would lodge an appeal against the ruling.

On 7 July, a further extension of the nationwide lockdown until 1 August was announced by President Iván Duque, who also confirmed that municipalities with no coronavirus infections or with low infection rates would be allowed to open restaurants, theaters and gyms under strict protocols at the request of mayors. According to the President, as of that day 490 out of the country's 1,122 municipalities had not reported any COVID-19 cases, while 100 had low infection rates and a further 295 had not reported cases in the last three weeks. It was also announced that a pilot for reactivation of domestic flights was authorized to be carried out in the route between Bucaramanga and Cúcuta, with the date for the first flight to be decided by mutual agreement with the authorities of both cities. On 16 July, Duque confirmed that this first pilot would be held on 21 July.

On 9 July, mayor of Cali Jorge Iván Ospina announced that ivermectin would start being used experimentally to treat patients with COVID-19 in the city who are in the early stages of the disease with the aim of preventing the symptoms from worsening and curtail the viral load, thus reducing the number of severe cases that would require admission to intensive care units. The medication, primarily used to treat parasite infestations, was reported to have been used in Ecuador, Peru, and Cuba with positive results. Despite having pointed out that there was no scientific evidence on the effectiveness of ivermectin to treat patients with COVID-19, the National Institute for Food and Drug Surveillance (Invima) greenlit the conduct of a clinical study in Cali with 400 patients for 28 days to determine its effectiveness as a treatment. After the announcement by mayor Ospina, it was reported that citizens in Cali headed to drugstores to buy ivermectin, leading authorities and health experts to tell citizens to not self-medicate themselves.

On 10 July, mayor of Bogotá Claudia López announced a series of 14-day sectorized lockdowns to be enforced from 13 July as a measure to cope with the peak of the pandemic, which was expected to occur in the city by early August. Fifteen out of the city's 20 localities were split into three groups, with the first of those comprising the Ciudad Bolívar, San Cristóbal, Rafael Uribe Uribe, Chapinero, Santa Fe, Usme, Los Mártires and Tunjuelito localities being under lockdown from 13 to 26 July. The second group, comprising the Bosa, Kennedy, Puente Aranda and Fontibón localities, would be under lockdown from 27 July to 9 August, while the last group, comprising the Suba, Engativá and Barrios Unidos localities would be under lockdown from 10 to 23 August.

On 13 July, and due to the steady increase of COVID-19 cases in Medellín and the Antioquia Department, mayor of Medellín Daniel Quintero declared a "state of total care" (Estado de cuidado total) in coordination with department and national governments. The declaration implied that strict lockdowns would be enforced in Medellín and the other municipalities making up the Metropolitan Area of the Aburrá Valley every weekend, with four days of opening and three days (Friday, Saturday, Sunday) of closure per week. In case of a holiday falling on Monday, that day would also be included in the periods of closure. Mayor Quintero would confirm on 28 July that he had tested positive for the disease, being asymptomatic.

By 16 July, and despite the expansion of hospital capacity that had been carried out since the onset of the pandemic to strengthen the country's health system, several cities were already reporting high percentages of ICU occupancy: 91% in Bogotá, 86% in Medellín, 95% in Cali, and 82% in Montería, while Riohacha and Quibdó reported less than 10 units still available in each city. In Barranquilla, where an orange alert was declared in mid-June and had ICU occupancy peak at 90%, occupancy was reported to have lowered to 73%.

On 28 July, Health Minister Fernando Ruiz stated in an interview with W Radio that Colombia had signed confidentiality agreements with two pharmaceutical companies for the acquisition of a vaccine for COVID-19. The companies with which those agreements had been signed were reported to be Pfizer and AstraZeneca, which at the time was developing a vaccine along with the University of Oxford. According to the minister's estimate, six million people were expected to be vaccinated in a first stage, and in addition to those two agreements, Ruiz stated that the country would be looking to reach agreements with at least three other companies. That same day, the daily number of new positive cases surpassed 10,000 for the first time since the onset of the pandemic, with 10,284 new cases being reported by the National Health Institute. During his daily broadcast, President Iván Duque announced a further extension of the nationwide lockdown for one month until 30 August, stating that municipalities with none or low COVID-19 infections would continue with the reopening of economic sectors avoiding large gatherings, while areas with high infection rates would continue under more stringent restrictions.

==== August ====
On 5 August, former President of Colombia Álvaro Uribe was confirmed to have tested positive for COVID-19, being asymptomatic. His two sons Tomás and Jerónimo were also reported to have tested positive.

On 11 August, it was announced that the Ministries of Health and the Interior greenlit pilot plans for operation of six routes from José María Córdova International Airport in Rionegro, which serves Medellín. The routes authorized to operate, starting from 18 August, were the ones from Rionegro to Bucaramanga, Cúcuta, Pereira, Manizales, Armenia, and San Andrés Island. By 13 August, it was confirmed that 15 airports had been enabled to resume operations with pilot flights: in addition to Bucaramanga, Cúcuta and Rionegro, Palmira (serving Cali), Soledad (serving Barranquilla), Cartagena, Santa Marta, Armenia, Pereira, Manizales, Medellín, Montería, Bogotá, Chachagüí (serving Pasto) and San Andrés were all approved to resume operations upon agreement between local authorities of their respective cities, with Villavicencio also expected to present a proposal for resumption of flights to and from said city. Mayor of Bogotá Claudia López stated that flight operation from Bogotá would be resumed as of 1 September with flights to Cartagena, Leticia and San Andrés, destinations approved by the Ministry of Health considering that by then they would have passed the peak of the pandemic and that, in addition, meet epidemiological criteria. Additionally, it was announced that a negative COVID-19 test would be required to enter San Andrés Island, which travellers would have to take two days before the flight.

On 12 August the authorities of Caquetá Department and its capital Florencia made a decision to put the entire department under lockdown for 10 days starting on 15 August and ending on 25 August due to the exponential growth of COVID-19 cases, which saw the number of total cases in the department go up from 300 to 2,794 in the three most recent weeks. After an analysis by the Caquetá branch of the Colombian Medical College, a strict quarantine was seen as a possible efficient measure to lower both the contagion curve as well as the pressure on the medical services of the department, with ICU occupation surpassing 90% and delays of up to 10 days in the delivery of test results.

On 13 August, mayor of Bogotá Claudia López announced that over 1.2 million people living in the localities of Usaquén, Chapinero, Santa Fe, La Candelaria, Teusaquillo, Puente Aranda, and Antonio Nariño would be under a two-week lockdown from 16 to 30 August as these zones still had high speed of virus transmission and affectation. While Puente Aranda, Chapinero, Santa Fe, and Antonio Nariño had already experienced the sectorized lockdown model, those zones were once again quarantined since the aforementioned factors had not been lowered. This announcement was met with mixed reactions: while citizens from some of the localities to go under lockdown praised the decision, other citizens, as well as traders and entrepreneurs voiced their disagreement and staged protests against the measure.

On 20 August, an outbreak at a nursing home in Manizales was discovered with 74 elderly people testing positive for COVID-19 following an index case detected on 17 August, with the ensuing epidemiological fence and quick tests also confirming 11 residents testing negative, 12 positive cases among the place's workers, and nine others pending a result. One of the infected adults had to be taken to an intensive care unit while others had to be isolated in hotels at the city.

On 24 August, President Iván Duque announced that the lockdown that was in force in the country since March would end on 1 September, and starting from that day and for at least one month, the country would enter into a new stage named "selective isolation", aimed at isolating only specific cases of people infected or suspected to be infected with the virus and their inner circle while also lifting most restrictions on mobility for the remainder of the population. According to the Colombian government, this decision was reached since most of the country's main cities were experiencing a plateau in their contagion curves and some others had already started a downwards trend in their numbers of new cases and deaths, which would allow to accelerate the economic reactivation of the country. Concerts, sporting events, and others that can cause massive crowds of people would remain forbidden, as well as the consumption of alcohol in public places, while local rulers would be able to retain the power to maintain some control measures, mainly in the cities with the greatest impact. However, President Duque pointed out that the health emergency which was also in place in the country would be extended until 30 November.

That same day, Health Minister Fernando Ruiz confirmed the participation of Colombian volunteers in the Phase III trials of the Ad26.COV2.S vaccine, developed by Janssen Pharmaceuticals. The clinical trials were scheduled to take place in September 2020, once the report on the previous stages of the vaccine was available. In this announcement, Ruiz added that a confidentiality agreement to allow the country access to the vaccine had already been signed.

On 26 August, a new decree in Bogotá specifically prohibited indoor entertainment including bars, dance clubs, gambling casinos, and video game arcades. It remained unclear whether outdoor amusement parks would be legally permitted. The Colombian Association of Attractions and Amusement Parks (Acolap), which has six open-air parks in Bogotá, planned to reopen.

==== September ====
On 8 September, it was revealed that a 41-year man who had traveled from Bogotá to Cartagena by plane on 2 September on business matters, and had passed all screening and biosafety filters at both airports died of COVID-19. The passenger started showing symptoms in the evening of the same day of the trip, and was admitted to a hospital three days later as his condition worsened, testing positive and passing away shortly afterwards. Following the discovery, health authorities in Cartagena proceeded to track all passengers of the flight as well as all possible close contacts who might have been within 2 metres of the patient to perform an epidemiological fence and further tests if required.

By that day, there was a sharp drop in the number of confirmed daily infections, despite the fact that the average number of daily tests carried out was maintained (between 20,000 and 25,000 PCR and between 7,000 and 10,000 antigen ones), with the health authority reporting on 7 September 5,327 new infections in the last 24 hours, after 21,856 PCR tests and 8,760 antigen tests were processed, while in the previous three days over 8,000 infections were reported on average, thus signaling a decreasing trend. Daily deaths also dropped, going down to 203 that day and going back to levels reached one or two months prior.

On 10 September, Health Minister Fernando Ruiz made an analysis of the situation of the pandemic in the country six months after its onset. According to Ruiz, the pandemic had developed in the country in a similar way to that of the rest of the world, and identified four moments according to the degree of affectation of the different cities of the country. A first moment, with a very quick, high and severe impact was experienced in Leticia, with affectation in said city being more similar to the situation in Brazil, and later a second moment in coastal cities such as Barranquilla, Cartagena, Buenaventura and Tumaco, as well as Quibdó. The third wave, which was being experienced at the moment, involved peaks in the main cities such as Bogotá, Medellín, and Cali, while a fourth wave was being expected in middle cities such as Bucaramanga, Cúcuta, Popayán, Pasto and others with a slower growth of cases such as Manizales in which positive cases were already starting to spike. Finally, there would be a last moment involving very dispersed areas of the country as well as small municipalities where the impact had been very low until then.

In mid-September, it was known that Senator Carlos Fernando Motoa petitioned the National Institute of Health to explain the reasons for the decline on the number of daily tests taken, which were sharply decreasing in the most recent weeks in spite of the fact that the country had the capability to perform 50,000 daily tests. In response to this petition, INS director Martha Ospina explained, in a document sent to the Senate's Seventh Commission, that processing by laboratories was not being delayed as they were reading all samples and releasing results within 30 hours, with some of them within 9 hours, and that the decrease in the number of tests was due to several factors including the decrease in the number of hospitalized and ICU patients due to COVID-19, changes in testing guidelines, decrease in massive screening, non-compliance of some laboratories with the rate defined by decree for tests, and refusal of people to take the test.

On 21 September, mayor of Bogotá Claudia López announced the lifting of several restrictions that were in place in the city to be able to mobilize or access commercial products and services which were part of the measures implemented to contain the pandemic, such as the pico y cédula, which restricted access to commercial establishments, while also allowing restaurants and other economic sectors to open every day, instead of some days per week as it was being enforced. The only restrictions that were left in place were those regarding entry times by sectors, to prevent thousands of people from converging in the city's public transport system at peak hours.

On 28 September, President Iván Duque announced the extension of the selective isolation stage in force since 1 September until the end of October, keeping the restrictions that were in place for such stage.

==== October ====
On 2 October, it was known that three people arriving by humanitarian flights from Madrid, Lima and Mexico City in the evening of 30 September entered the country while being positive for COVID-19. According to Migración Colombia, the passengers were allowed to board the flights despite showing the positive tests and after doing the same upon arrival to Colombia, the biosecurity protocol was activated and the three citizens were isolated. In addition to that, the other passengers of those flights were now compelled to isolate and test themselves. It was also reported that in the evening of 4 October a woman with her baby, both also positive for COVID-19, entered the country from Cancún, Mexico in a flight operated by the airline Wingo.

On 5 October, in a flight from Medellín to Bogotá operated by Avianca, a group of musicians of the Medellín Philharmonic Orchestra offered a concert to the passengers using wind instruments such as trumpets, which generated widespread criticism against the airline for breaching biosecurity protocols as those instruments have been considered by experts to help spread the virus in closed spaces such as an aircraft cabin. The following day, Migración Colombia director Juan Francisco Espinoza informed that up to that day, 70 passengers had been refused entry into the country for failing to present a negative PCR test result, while the Civil Aeronautics announced the opening of investigations against both Wingo and Avianca in response to the incidents involving both airlines.

On 7 October, the Phase III clinical trials of the vaccine developed by Janssen Pharmaceutica began, with the application of the first dose to a volunteer in Floridablanca. The trials of this vaccine were being carried out in 10 medical centers throughout the country, however, on 12 October Johnson & Johnson announced it would pause temporarily the trials since one volunteer became ill with "an unexplained disease".

On 19 October, the Colombian government reported that 242 medical teams were attacked between January and September 2020, a 63 percent increase over 2019. Attacks ranged from threats and discrimination to injuries to health personnel. According to the Health Ministry of Colombia, about 38 per cent of the cases of aggression against health workers occurred in a context related to the pandemic, with nurses, doctors, ambulance drivers, technicians and assistants being accused of medical negligence or discriminated against for being considered a source of contagion.

On 20 October, the Colombian government announced a ban on public Halloween celebrations on 31 October. According to Health Minister Fernando Ruiz, the decision was reached since there was scientific evidence that parties and gatherings have been the main cause of new COVID-19 infections in Europe, while the high rate of population at risk in the country did not allow to make way for situations in which their lives could be endangered. Moreover, candy-picking tours on streets and shopping malls were deemed to generate supercontagators, spreading the virus as they go from door to door. Lastly, the country was on a downwards yet still fragile trend in the epidemic curve, and celebrations such as Halloween could cause troubles to keep said trend. In addition to this, territorial entities were free to set curfews for the weekend, with several departamental capital cities and intermediate towns such as Bucaramanga, Ibagué, Tunja, Manizales, Armenia, Pereira and Neiva applying the measure.

On 23 October, Vice-president Marta Lucía Ramírez was confirmed to have tested positive for COVID-19, albeit asymptomatic and in good health. The Colombian government stated she had taken the test on Thursday ahead of a planned conference with local governors, and that she was carrying out the corresponding isolation. President Iván Duque, who had her appear on his nightly television broadcast on Monday, was also tested on Thursday, with the result being negative.

On 24 October the country reached 1 million confirmed coronavirus cases, becoming the second country in Latin America to report that number in less than a week, after Argentina, as well as the eighth country in the world to have reached that number. On that day, 8,769 new cases, 198 new deaths, and 5,727 new recoveries were reported for a total of 1,007,711 confirmed cases, 30,000 deaths and 907,379 recoveries.

On 28 October, President Iván Duque announced the extension of the selective isolation stage until 30 November, with the same permissions and restrictions being kept in place through November.

==== November ====
A poll conducted from 9 November to 10 December by the National Administrative Department of Statistics (Dane) found that only half of Colombians wanted to be vaccinated against coronavirus. In Quibdó, 72 percent said they wanted the vaccine, but in Cali, only 43 percent wanted it. Among those who said they did not want the vaccine, most said they feared side effects.

On 25 November, President Iván Duque extended the state of health emergency for 90 additional days until 28 February 2021. The decision was reached since Tunja and cities in the Coffee Axis such as Manizales and Pereira were still going through their first peak of infection, and prevention measures needed to be reinforced ahead of the start of December. The extension of the health emergency also implied the extension of the selective isolation stage for the same period of time, with its involved restrictions.

On 28 November, the National Health Institute (INS) released the preliminary findings of its seroprevalence study aimed at determining a more accurate estimate on the percentage of Colombian population that had already had contact with the novel coronavirus, with or without symptoms. The study was being performed in 10 cities through strategies such as mass, random sampling and blood test analysis on over 20,000 people, with the first findings revealing that nearly 60% of screened people in Leticia (59%) and Barranquilla (57%) had developed coronavirus antibodies, which could indicate they could have already been infected, while in Medellín antibodies were found in nearly one in three people (27%). While those results showed that the country has taken steps heading to a potential herd immunity given that the seroprevalence findings were higher than in other countries, it was also evident that the proportion of the population still susceptible to infection was still high and the containment strategies of the virus were not the best.

==== December ====
On 2 December, former senator Juan José García Romero died of COVID-19 at age 76.

On 18 December, the Colombian government announced the plan for COVID-19 vaccination to be carried out during 2021, after having secured 40 million doses from Pfizer and AstraZeneca. According to the schedule presented by the government, mass vaccination would begin in February and would be divided into five stages. The first stage will cover all front-line health and support workers, as well as people aged over 80, who are considered the segment of the population at the highest risk. The second stage will cover health workers in the second and third lines of attention, as well as people aged 60 to 79, while the third stage will cover inhabitants aged 16 to 60 with comorbidities as well as the entirety of elementary and high school teachers, to ensure the return of students to face-to-face classes. The first three stages will make up the first phase, in which the objective will be reducing mortality and severe case incidence rates from COVID-19, as well as protecting health workers. The second phase, comprising the last two stages, will be aimed at reducing infection rates to reach herd immunity and will cover institutional caregivers and population involved in risky occupations and situations, as well as the people aged 16 and 60 without comorbidities. To achieve herd immunity, the government expects to vaccinate roughly 70% of the Colombian population, or 35,734,649 people. People who have already suffered the disease, nearly 1.5 million as of that day, will not be included in the vaccination plan, nor will be children under 16 as vaccine tests performed until now have not covered that segment of the population. In all, around 34 million Colombians will be eligible to be vaccinated.

On 21 December, the National Health Institute (INS) released additional findings of its seroprevalence study in five cities, where about one-third of sampled residents had developed coronavirus antibodies: Bogotá (30%), Bucaramanga (32%), Cúcuta (40%) and Villavicencio (34%). Out of the 10 cities chosen by the INS to carry out this study, the results for Cali, Ipiales, and Guapi were still to be reported. An additional study performed by the University of Córdoba found a 59% seroprevalence in Montería. Considering the seroprevalence reports for these cities, along with the findings for Leticia, Barranquilla, and Medellín that were reported in late November, an estimate of 4.6 million Colombians could have already been infected by coronavirus, half of those in Bogotá and thrice more than the cases found by testing and official records.

=== 2021 ===
==== January ====
While there had been 5,539 intensive care beds in Colombia at the beginning of 2019, by the beginning of 2021 hospitals had increased this to 11,905 beds specifically to address the expected needs of COVID-19 patients. In January 2021, three-quarters of these intensive-care beds were occupied. The department of Quindío, with 74% occupancy, was representative of the national average. Bogotá had a higher rate (92% overall occupancy, and 93% occupancy of the beds designated for COVID patients).

On 20 January, a spokesperson for OPS said that Colombia was in the first group of eligible countries for vaccine distribution through the COVAX strategy as it met the criteria for inclusion due to its preparation and readiness, with distribution likely starting from the first week of February.

On 21 January, the total number of confirmed deaths in Colombia during the pandemic reached 50,000, with the number of confirmed cases surpassing 2 million two days later.

On 28 January, Colombia's response to the pandemic was described as the third worst out of a group of 98 countries according to the Lowy Institute, an independent think tank in Australia, only ahead of Brazil and Mexico.

On 29 January, President Iván Duque announced that the process of mass vaccination in Colombia would begin on 20 February, and also signed the decree for the National Plan of Vaccination which had been announced in December as the country's guideline for mass vaccination. Duque also confirmed the purchase of 10 million doses of the Moderna vaccine and 2.5 million doses of the vaccine by Sinovac, which added to 10 million doses from Pfizer–BioNTech, 10 million doses from Oxford–AstraZeneca, 9 million doses from Janssen, and 10 million doses through COVAX would be able to cover the 34 million Colombians eligible for vaccination.

On 30 January, the National Institute of Health confirmed the detection of the new P.1 variant of SARS-CoV-2 (later to be known under the name "Gamma") which had already been identified in Brazil, in a 24-year-old patient from Tabatinga, Amazonas state of Brazil who crossed the border to seek medical care in Leticia. As a preventive measure to avoid the spread of that new strain into the country, starting from 29 January passenger flights to and from Leticia were suspended for 15 days while flights between Colombia and Brazil were suspended for 30 days. An older adult in Bogotá had already died of COVID-19 caused by P.1 on 28 January, though this was not reported until weeks later.

==== February ====
On 11 February, Bogotá's District government announced that the temporary policy initiative of "cielo abierto" (open-air operating businesses) would be made permanent. To achieve this, the city will consider adjusting existing restrictions on the use of public space.

Two hundred international tourists were trapped in Leticia after the highly-contagious Brazilian variant of COVID-19 virus was discovered in the city on 30 January. Two weeks later the Colombian government agreed to fly the tourists out of Alfredo Vásquez Cobo International Airport if the individuals were willing to pay. Regularly scheduled flights to and from the city were due to resume on 2 March.

On 15 February, the first batch of COVID-19 vaccines manufactured by Pfizer and BioNTech, containing 50,000 doses, arrived at El Dorado International Airport in Bogotá where it was received by President Iván Duque, Vice President Marta Lucía Ramírez, and Minister of Health Fernando Ruiz. Duque said that this first batch of vaccines will be destined for front-line health and support personnel, while also confirming that the Colombian government expected the arrival of 1,600,000 additional doses within the following 30 days. That same day, Minister Ruiz confirmed that an intensive care nurse from Sincelejo's University Hospital and another nurse from the National Cancerology Institute in Bogotá would be the first two people to be vaccinated in the country, on 17 February.

As announced by Minister of Health Fernando Ruiz, the Colombian vaccination plan started in the city of Sincelejo on the morning of 17 February with the vaccination of intensive care nurse Verónica Machado, under widespread media coverage.

On 19 February, the Ministry of Health confirmed that at least 45,000 doses out of the first shipment of 192,000 doses of the vaccine by Sinovac, which were expected to arrive to the country the following day, would be sent to the municipalities of Leticia, Puerto Nariño, Mitú, and Inírida in the departments of Amazonas, Vaupés, and Guainía to immunize the entirety of the population aged over 18. With this decision, the Colombian government intended to build in those three departments, which border Brazil, an epidemiological blockade to contain the Brazilian variant and prevent its arrival in other areas of the country. This exceptional measure did not cover pregnant women nor people with a COVID-19 positive test result earlier than 90 days.

On 25 February, President Iván Duque announced on his daily broadcast a further extension of the state of health emergency for three months until 31 May 2021. The health emergency was slated to expire on 28 February.

==== March ====
During the first two weeks of the vaccination program, 191,480 first doses were administered. Public health expert Luis Jorge Hernández said the distribution was operating under a scarcity mentality given that only 509,724 doses had arrived in Colombia (including the ones already administered), whereas the Health Ministry had expected to have 850,000 by that point.

President Duque announced that new curfews would be implemented beginning 26 March. Areas where ICU occupancy was over 50% would have a midnight curfew, and, where the ICU occupancy was over 70%, the curfew would begin two hours earlier. The government was most concerned about the regions of Magdalena, Antioquia, Valle del Cauca, and Atlántico, all of which had occupancy rates of 70–79%.

==== April ====
On 4 April, the Colombian government issued new measures aimed at curtailing the third wave of the pandemic as well as the increase of new cases in several cities of the country. Starting from 5 April and until 19 April, the government instructed mayors to implement night curfews in cities with ICU occupancy over 50%, with start times varying depending on the occupancy rate of ICUs. Cities with ICU occupancy above 85% should start their curfew at 6:00 pm, cities with occupancy between 80% and 84% should start at 8:00 pm, the ones with occupancy between 70% and 79% should start at 10:00 pm, while the ones with ICU occupancy ranging from 50% to 69% should begin at midnight. For all cases, curfews will end at 5:00 a.m. the following day. The government also suggested the implementation of the pico y cédula measure to restrict individual mobility, with hotels, restaurants, and parks being exempted from the measure. Medellín and Barranquilla, which had ICU occupancy around 90%, additionally planned to implement prohibition. Police in Cali broke up dozens of parties on 10 April, one of which was attended by over 200 people.

Bogotá's mayor announced on 13 April that, since the city's ICU occupancy had risen to 75%, quarantine rules would be stricter than originally planned through 19 April and would also be in effect during the weekend of 23–26 April.

On 16 April, the National Health Institute confirmed the detection of the Alpha variant of SARS-CoV-2, finding it in two out of the 637 virus genomes sequenced up to that date, which were confirmed to come from samples taken in the Caldas Department. That variant, still of non-predominant circulation in the country, is considered to be more transmissible than the original versions of the SARS-CoV-2 virus but no more lethal than those. The next day, the Public Health Laboratory of Bogotá and the University of Los Andes confirmed the circulation of that variant as well as the Gamma one in the capital, finding six genomes corresponding to the Alpha variant and five genomes to the Gamma variant.

Martha Ospina, director of the National Institute of Health (INS), gave several reasons for the April 2021 wave which by the end of the month already showed an increase in mortality. According to the official, people had relaxed their personal biosecurity habits and begun to gather again; many people, especially in Bogotá and Medellín, had never been infected and were thus more susceptible to infection; and extra risk was posed by new SARS-CoV-2 variants including B.1.111 (the second most common type in Colombia, which was a more infectious type) and recent detection of the Gamma (P.1) and Alpha (B.1.1.7) variants.

==== May ====
By the second week of May, 96% of the ICU beds in Bogotá were full. Mayor Claudia López warned that the hospital system was near collapse due to the occupancy rate. She identified Suba, Engativá, Kennedy, Bosa, and Barrios Unidos as the most contagious areas of the city at that time. On 14 May, López confirmed she had tested positive for COVID-19 and appointed Bogotá's Health Secretary Alejandro Gómez as deputy District Mayor for the duration of her period of isolation.

With nearly 15,000 confirmed deaths and over 500,000 new COVID-19 cases, May 2021 became the deadliest month of the pandemic in Colombia as the third wave that came from the Holy Week holidays in April was considered to have reached a plateau and extended into May with a daily average of 20,000 new cases and 500 deaths during that month. With ICU occupancy in the main cities around 95%, the Colombian Association of Emergency Specialists (Asociación Colombiana de Especialistas en Urgencias y Emergencias - ACEM) warned about shortages of oxygen, medicines and supplies for the care of critical patients. According to ACEM, emergency rooms were also under heavy pressure, with occupancy over 160%.

The 2021 Colombian protests, which started on 28 April, were also believed to be a factor that could have influenced the steady increase of new cases in May, with the week between 10 and 16 May (two weeks after the first demonstrations) presenting 115,668 infections (6% increase from the previous week) and 3,446 deaths (9% increase). In the following two weeks, the number of new cases was 114,000 and 150,823, while deaths remained above 3,400 per week (3,424 and 3,558). According to experts such as PhD in Public Health Luis Jorge Hernández, the pandemic curve did not start going down in the second half of May for several reasons: the impact of crowding at demonstrations during the ongoing social unrest in the country, the circulation of variants of concern, the poor results of the testing and tracing strategy (Prass) and the increase of positivity levels which reached 30–40%, as well as the still low pace of the vaccination process.

==== June ====
On 2 June, the Ministry of Health issued Resolution 777 by which criteria for the economic reactivation of the country were established. While self-care measures continued being encouraged as a general guideline, municipalities with ICU occupancy below 85% were authorized to open nightclubs and dance venues as well as holding mass events to 25% capacity. Moreover, municipalities with vaccination stage coverage above 70% would be able to increase capacity in events to 50% and could later move up to 75% depending on their epidemiological index scores. It was also announced that students will return to schools and universities once teachers receive their second vaccine dose, which was estimated to happen around 15 July according to the schedule of the national plan of vaccination, as well as the removal of the requirement of a negative PCR test to enter the country and the CoronApp application for domestic flights.

==== July ====
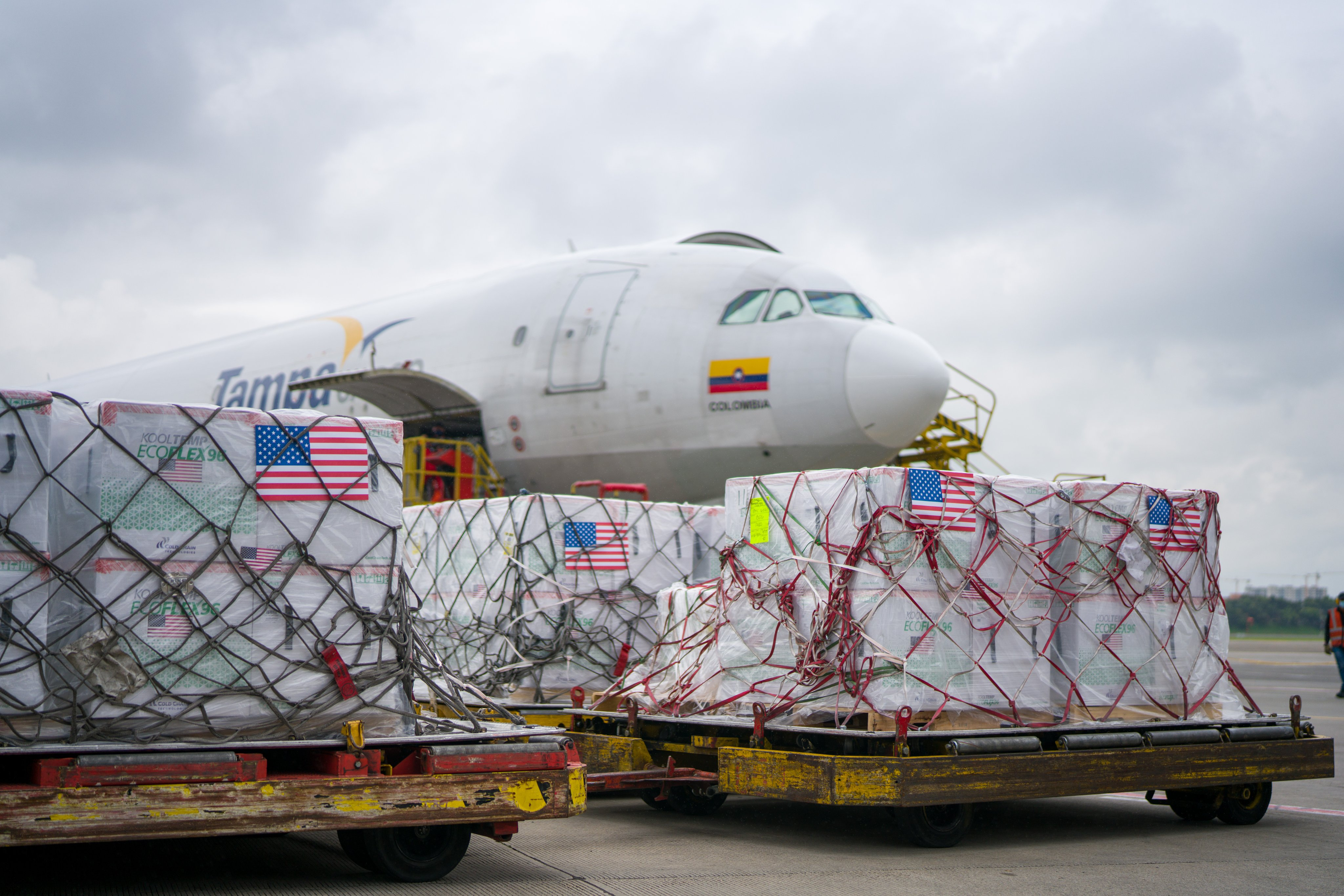
The US delivers Moderna COVID-19 vaccines to Colombia as part of the COVAX program in 2021.

On the morning of 24 July President Iván Duque confirmed the detection of the Delta variant of SARS-CoV-2, in a patient in the city of Cali who had travelled to the United States and presented symptoms after returning to the country. The patient was confirmed positive for COVID-19 following a PCR test and was reported to be in isolation and in good health condition.

==== August ====
By 10 August, the Delta variant of SARS-CoV-2 was confirmed to have been detected in Bogotá as well as the departments of Valle del Cauca and Santander. Four cases were confirmed in the Colombian capital on 4 August while in Bucaramanga, capital city of the Santander Department, the city's Health Secretary confirmed another one the next day. The Delta variant further extended to Antioquia, with four confirmed cases in Medellín, one in Segovia, and two in Envigado, as well as the Huila Department.

On 30 August, the World Health Organization (WHO) named lineage B.1.621 Mu variant and designated it as a variant of interest (VOI). Mu was first detected in Colombia in January 2021 and was also the most extended variant in the country, accounting for 39% of sequences identified and 53% of infections according to the National Health Institute (INS).

==== October ====
On 26 October 2021, the WHO announced the launch of its Solidarity Vaccine Trial, cosponsored by the governments of Colombia, Mali and the Philippines. The two vaccine candidates in this trial are "a protein subunit vaccine from Medigen, and a DNA vaccine encoding the spike protein from Inovio." More countries are expected to join the program.

==== December ====
The first cases of the Omicron variant were reported by the government on 20 December. The carriers had recently traveled from the United States and Spain. Over the next several days, new cases and active cases in Bogotá sharply increased, though the city had not yet officially confirmed an Omicron case. Bogotá did not have tests that could detect Omicron. Luis Ernesto Gómez, Bogotá's acting mayor while Mayor Claudia López had COVID for the second time, said before Christmas that the public should assume and behave as if Omicron were already spreading in Bogotá.

By 30 December, Omicron was officially confirmed to be circulating in Bogotá with 15 cases, and the Antioquia department with one case. Moreover, Health Minister Fernando Ruiz stated that the country was entering a fourth wave of infections, with positive cases spiking in the four most important cities: Bogotá, Medellín, Cali, and Barranquilla.

=== 2022 ===
==== January ====
By the start of the year, Omicron was already nearly the most common variant in the country. It was officially confirmed as the dominant variant by Minister of Health Fernando Ruiz on 6 January, stating that Omicron accounted for 60% of Colombia's genomic surveilliance map by 2 January.

On 28 January, the antiviral medication Molnupiravir was granted an emergency use authorization (EUA) by the National Institute for Food and Drug Surveillance (Invima) to treat those infected with COVID-19, under special conditions. According to Invima, the drug should be used for treatment of mild to moderate disease in patients with COVID-19 diagnosis confirmed by PCR or antigen test, as well as unvaccinated older adults who have not been previously infected by the virus but have at least one risk factor to develop severe COVID, such as obesity, heart conditions, chronic kidney disease or cancer. However, the use of Molnupiravir was not recommended for patients who require hospitalization, nor patients who begin treatment five days after the onset of symptoms. Likewise, it should not be used for longer than five days nor in patients who had previously presented the disease.

==== February ====
On 23 February, the Colombian government announced that municipalities with at least 70% of their population fully vaccinated (not counting booster doses) would no longer require mandatory use of face masks in open spaces, starting immediately. As of that day, 451 municipalities, including the capital Bogotá as well as Medellín and Barranquilla, met the 70% coverage threshold. This measure did not extend to public transportation systems, offices, classrooms and other closed spaces gathering several people without an adequate ventilation, where people would still have to use face masks.
