= Healing of periapical lesions =

Apical periodontitis is typically the body's defense response to the threat of microbial invasion from the root canal. Primary among the members of the host defense mechanism is the polymorphonuclear leukocyte, otherwise known as the neutrophil. The task of the neutrophil is to locate and destroy microbes that intrude into the body – anywhere in the body – and they represent the hallmark of acute inflammation.

== The body's response to microbial invasion ==
Tooth #5, the upper right second premolar, after extraction. The two single-headed arrows point to the CEJ, which is the line separating the crown (in this case, heavily decayed) and the roots. The double headed arrow (bottom right) shows the extent of the abscess that surrounds the apex of the palatal root.

In response to tissue injury, neutrophils leave the circulatory system in great numbers and gather at the site of tissue injury. They are drawn to the site by chemotaxis, following a concentration gradient of chemotactic molecules until they reach the site of greatest concentration: the site of injury and microbial presence. Once there, the antimicrobial action of superoxide and hydrogen peroxide, derived from the metabolic processes of the neutrophils, act to combat the microbial invasion. While primarily mobilized to kill the invading microorganisms, the neutrophils actually cause a significant amount of host tissue damage as well. Although the neutrophils themselves rarely remain alive for more than a few days, the excessive accumulation of dead neutrophils and the enzymes they released is a major cause of tissue breakdown in the acute phases of apical periodontitis.

Soon after inflammation has been initiated, macrophages enter the scene and, if not controlled by the initial ambush of neutrophils and their tactics, the microbial invasion is faced with a second strike consisting of these leukocytes, along with lymphocytes. Together, the cells of this second strike compose the bulk of the apical periodontitis lesion and serve an important role in the subsequent chronic phase of inflammation of apical periodontitis, as they can live for many months. Some researchers posit that it must not be macrophages that are involved, as they could not appropriately discriminate between the varied array of opsonized entities as necessary, and that, in reality, the properties ascribed to the macrophage in the initiation phase of the inflammatory response actually belong to the lymphatic dendritic cell. It is unclear, however, if the latter is a distinct population of cells or if it is merely a particularly specialized strain of macrophage.

When infections such as these occur elsewhere in the body, the host defense system, able to travel the body via the circulatory system, is, more often than not, capable of appropriately gaining access to the site of infection in order to mount a proper and successful retaliation. Dental pulp, which is a richly vascularized and innervated tissue, is enclosed by tissues, such as dentin, which are incapable of expanding. It has terminal blood flow and possesses only small-gauge circulatory access at the apical foramen. All of these characteristics severely constrain the defensive capacity of the pulp tissue when faced with the different aggressions to which it may be subjected. As a result, necrotic tissue located within the pulp chamber and canals provide nutrients for pathogenic bacteria to grow and form a periapical lesion; the infected tooth serves as a biochemically and physiologically ideal location for bacterial growth and maturation, and, in essence, acts as a refuge from which bacterial reinforcements can mobilize to the periapical lesion. It is this concept that serves as the basis for conventional endodontic therapy; both chemical and mechanical debridement procedures are essential in effectively disrupting and removing the microbial ecosystem that is associated with the disease process. Thus, whenever a pulp is removed and the canal treated and filled in a manner that is compatible with or favorable to a physiologic reaction, we may expect a satisfactory percentage of endodontic success.

== Breakthrough in bacteriology ==
In 1890, W.D. Miller, considered the father of oral microbiology, was the first to associate pulpal disease with the presence of bacteria. This was confirmed by Kakehashi, who, in 1965, proved that bacteria were the cause of pulpal and periradicular disease in studies using animal models; pulpal exposures were initiated in both normal and germ-free rats, and while no pathologic changes were exhibited in the mouths of the germ-free rats, introduction of the normal oral microbial flora produced pulpal necrosis and led to periradicular lesion formation in the normal rats. The germ-free rats healed regardless of the severity of pulpal exposure, demonstrating that the presence or absence of bacteria was the determinant for pulpal and periapical disease.

Moreover, it has since been discovered that endodontic infections are polymicrobial. In fact, the bacteria present within endodontic infections are thoroughly similar to the bacteria that are involved in periodontal disease. It has also been shown that certain enzymes produced by bacteria are detrimental to the host, and can work in concert with the destructive capability of the enzymes released by dying neutrophils. Recent studies have revealed that the gene for collagenases could be detected in stains of Porphyromonas gingivalis, one of the many endodontic infective agents that are also involved in periodontal disease.

Additionally, it has been proven that a positive correlation exists between the number of bacteria in an infected root canal and the size of the resultant periradicular radiolucency.

In attempting to resolve a periapical lesion of endodontic origin, it is essential to be conscious of these principles in order to effectively combat the infection. Without proper consideration for the causes, the pulpal and periapical infection cannot be suitably treated, for effective patient management requires the correct diagnosis and removal of the cause of the infection of endodontic origin to correct the associated periapical lesion. Because periapical disease is almost inevitably preceded by pulp disease, proper chemomechanical debridement of the infected root canals, together with incision and drainage of associated periradicular swellings, will usually allow for rapid improvement in patient signs and symptoms. The same end can be accomplished by extracting the involved tooth.

== Source of infection ==
Although periapical changes will be in response to pulpal changes the majority of the time, it is still important to determine the disease process sequence. When the disease process is of pulpal origin, the pulpal infection and necrosis may drain not only through the apical foramen, but also through an accessory canal, which may present radiographically as a periradicular or furcation radiolucency. This may further lead to furcal involvement through loss of clinical attachment and alveolar bone. A cursory clinical examination and radiographic analysis can easily lead the clinician off the right course and pulpal involvement might be overlooked when the tooth is asymptomatic. Similarly, a periodontal abscess may very well appear to be pulpal in origin, when in fact it is not. Notwithstanding the tissue of origin, though, when it is determined that there is a pulpal involvement to the periodontal lesion, the endodontic infection should be controlled prior to beginning definitive management of the periodontal lesion, especially when regenerative or bone grafting techniques are planned.

== Focusing on proper procedure ==
To achieve healing of the periapical lesion, one must obtain and maintain a decontaminated root canal system. System is to be emphasized, because the root canal system does not merely consist of tapering cone-shaped canals from orifice to apex, but rather, can and often is an intricate labyrinth of canals that diverge and weave to form an elaborate web of anastomosing passages. It is precisely because of this reality that “it is important to appreciate that files produce shape, but it is essential to understand that irrigants clean [the] root canal system. Copious amounts of sodium hypochlorite are necessary to utterly dissolve all remnants of pulp tissue as well as completely destroy all microorganisms. The tooth stability does not undergo major changes after surgery comparated with the initial value which was determined before establishing any kind of treatment.

=== Conventional therapy ===
Many authoritative clinicians and researchers advise completing endodontic therapy as soon as possible, especially in situations necessitating incision and drainage, in order to remove the cause of infection without delay. Recent studies have shown, however, that intracanal application of certain medicaments prior to the completion of endodontic therapy may produce highly favorable results when followed by conventional therapy, even when the periapical area is very large. The use of chlorhexidine gluconate and calcium hydroxide for infection control was shown to lead to substantial healing of a large periapical lesion.

The traditional thought that it is necessary to complete endodontic therapy as quickly as possible may be related only to the initial steps of therapy, namely, a thorough instrumentation, thus ensuring a proper biomechanical preparation. While completion of the procedure with immediate obturation might secure the decontaminated root canal system, delaying this step in order to allow for application of medicaments has been shown to be beneficial. Periodic application and renewal of calcium hydroxide over a year's time (four applications over a 12-month period), has been shown to represent a nonsurgical approach to resolving even extensive inflammatory periapical lesions.

=== Antibiotic coverage ===
The use of adjunctive antibiotics is usually uncalled for when proper debridement procedures can be executed in a conventional periapical lesion of endodontic origin; however, they can be centrally important to the treatment of a progressive or persistent infection. It has been proposed, however, that disinfection of the root canal by means of an antibacterial agent, such as propolis or otosporin, can lead to improved healing by reducing and controlling pulpal and periapical inflammatory reactions. This would, in turn, promote the healing process as well as provide for better control, prevention and reduction of post-treatment pain and discomfort.

== Biologic mediators ==
There are a number of active biologic mediators that have been implicated in promoting apical resorption. Matrix metalloproteinases (MMPs), which are endogenous zinc-dependent catabolic enzymes, are primarily responsible for the degradation of much of the tissue matrices built on such architecturally important substances as collagen and proteoglycan core proteins. Their biologic activities have been extensively researched and reviewed, and their importance in the pathogenesis of apical periodontitis is obvious. Furthermore, concentrations of IgG antibodies have been found to be nearly five times higher in lesions of apical periodontitis than in uninflamed oral mucosa.

Prostaglandins, specifically PGE2 and PGI2, are important in inflammation and have been implicated in promoting apical resorption. This is because neutrophils, which are rich sources of PGE2, are present when the majority of rapid bone loss occurs during the initial stages of apical periodontitis. It has been illustrated clinically that parenteral administration of indomethacin, an inhibitor of cyclooxygenase, can act to suppress resorption of apical hard tissue.

The predominant mechanism of bone resorption in a periapical lesion, as in the rest of the body, is the performed by osteoclasts. In the periapical lesion, mediators that are normally produced primarily only by osteoblasts are released by many other cells as well, overstimulating proosteoclasts. As a result, these begin to proliferate and several cells fuse to form multinucleated giant cells capable of spreading over the infected, injured site and cause resorption of the periapical alveolar bone.

== Endodontic success and failure ==
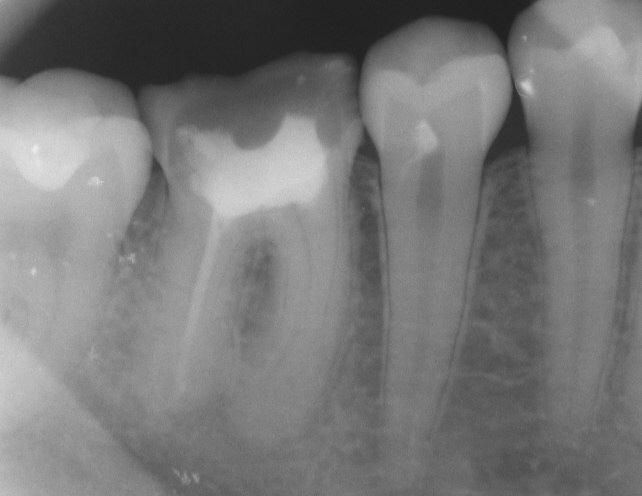
Tooth #30, the lower right first molar, with incomplete endodontic therapy: the mesial roots were left untreated, as can be evidences by the lack of gutta percha in the canals. This tooth requires retreatment to prevent a future infection from the non-treated canals.

It is possible that after conventional endodontic therapy has been completed, little to no resolution of the periapical lesion occurs over a considerable amount of time; there is a great deal of current research that discusses the possible reasons for this outcome and suggests possible treatment options. For example, it has been demonstrated that there is an association between nonresolving apical periodontitis lesions and the presence of cholesterol clefts within the periapical lesion; in fact, an incidence of up to 44% has been reported! It was shown that macrophages joined to form multinucleated giant cells and then produced a well-circumscribed area of tissue reaction, not unlike the granulomatous tissue reactions of a typical foreign body reaction, and persisted for up to 8 months. Similarly, endodontic materials as well as food debris may also be the cause of persistent periapical lesions. It was once shown that contaminated gutta percha resulted in a persistent periapical lesion for more than a decade!

== Non-surgical endodontic retreatment therapy ==
For retreatment of a non-healing lesion, there is really no magical method that can be employed; the course of action is merely to achieve what was supposed to have been achieved the first time. Keeping in mind the notion that endodontic retreatment is a problem-solving exploit will substantially increase its success.

After endodontic therapy has been executed, or re-executed, successfully, and the canals can no longer provide a nutrient-rich habitat for microbes, the issue of bone healing comes into focus. Ostensibly, then, for regeneration to occur, the root canal system must have been decontaminated and further access to microbial invasion must be prohibited. Regeneration of the bone has been demonstrated to occur, on average, at a rate of 3.2 mm² per month, and studies suggest that 71% of lesions have achieved complete resolution one year post-operatively.

Situations in which a surgical form of retreatment had been selected and in which apical resolution has still not occurred may still benefit from additional surgical intervention. A comparison of the outcome of periradicular surgery in teeth that had previously undergone surgical treatment versus teeth that were undergoing a surgical procedure for the first time showed that, after 5 years, 86% of surgically treated teeth healed with complete bone filling of the surgical cavity while only 59% of resurgically treated teeth healed with complete bone filling. It has thus been demonstrated that surgical retreatment of teeth previously treated with surgery is a valid alternative to extraction.

However, a combination of three antibiotics (metronidazole, ciprofloxacin, and minocycline) in a paste has been used successfully to treat these lesions non-surgically.
