= Lindhe =

Lindhe is a surname. Notable people with the surname include:

- Jan Lindhe (born 1935), Swedish periodontist
