= Tufts University School of Dental Medicine =

Private college in Boston, Massachusetts, US

Coordinates: 42.350°N 71.063°W

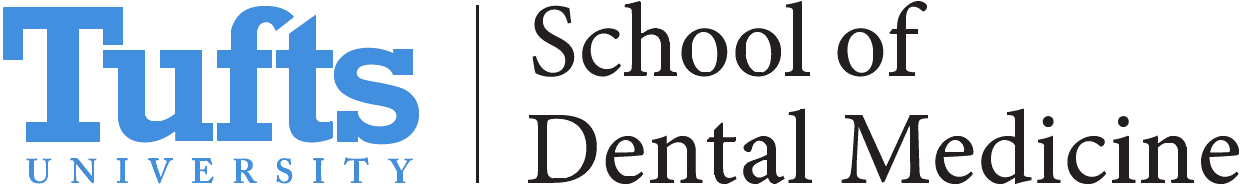
- Motto: Pax et Lux (Peace and Light)
- Type: Private
- Established: 1868
- Dean: Dr. Nadeem Karimbux
- Students: 703
- Location: Boston, Massachusetts, U.S.
- Campus: Urban
- Colors: Brown, Blue
- Website: dental.tufts.edu

Tufts University School of Dental Medicine (TUSDM) is a private, American dental school located in the Chinatown neighborhood of Boston, Massachusetts, and is connected to Tufts Medical Center. It is one of the 8 graduate schools that comprise Tufts University. Founded in 1868 as Boston Dental College by Dr. Isaac J. Wetherbee, the university is the second oldest dental school in the city, and one of the oldest in the country.

Acceptance to Tufts Dental Medicine is highly competitive. In the year 2023, Tufts University School of Dental Medicine had one of the lowest acceptance rates among all dental schools in the United States with an acceptance rate of 5%.

Tufts Dental Medicine, the Harvard School of Dental Medicine, and the Henry M. Goldman School of Dental Medicine at Boston University comprise the three schools of dental medicine in the Boston metropolitan area.

TUSDM educates both pre-doctoral and post-doctoral students. The majority of students pursue a Doctor of Dental Medicine (DMD) degree. In addition to the DMD degree, TUSDM offers combined DMD/MS (Master of Science in Dental Research) and DMD/MPH (Master of Public Health) degrees. Post-doctoral students, who have already obtained a DMD or DDS degree, can specialize in Oral and Maxillofacial Surgery, Endodontics, Periodontics, Orthodontics, Pediatric Dentistry, Prosthodontics and Implant Dentistry, as well as certificate programs in Craniomandibular Disorders and Orofacial Pain, Advanced Dental Technology and Research Program, Implant Dentistry Fellowship, and Advanced Education in Esthetic Dentistry.

In 2011, Dr. Huw F. Thomas, formerly Dean of the University of Alabama School of Dentistry was named the 16th Dean of TUSDM. That same year, TUSDM was nationally recognized for leadership in teaching, research, community service, and diversity by the American Dental Education Association (ADEA) Gies Foundation with the 2011 William J. Gies Award for Outstanding Achievement by an Academic Dental Institution.

== History ==
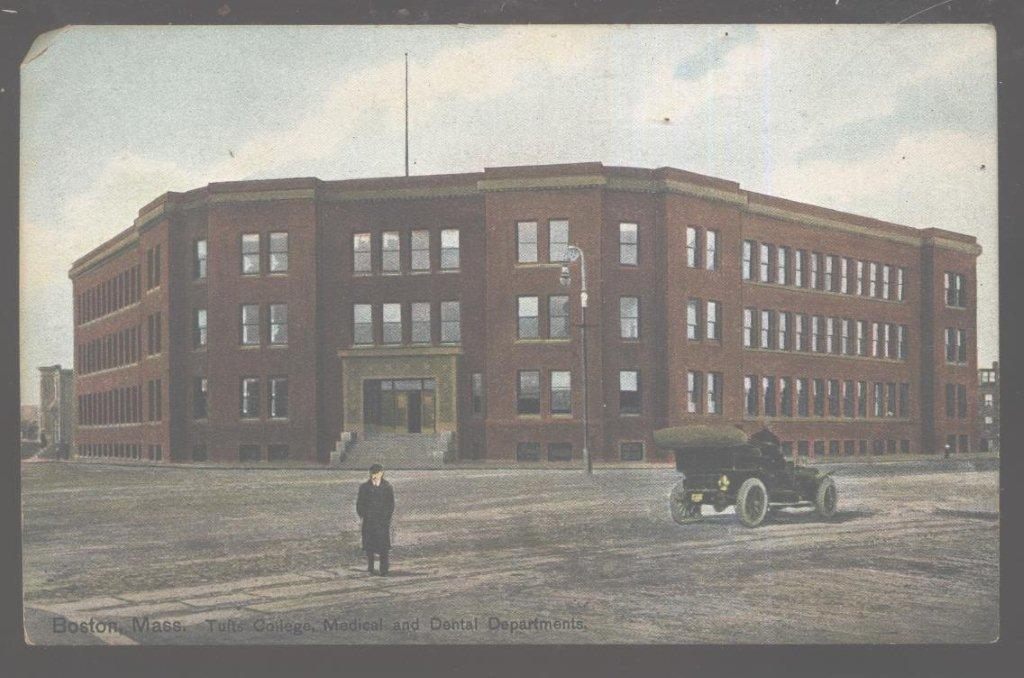
Tufts College Dental and Medical Building 1907

TUSDM was founded on June 3, 1868, as Boston Dental College by Dr. Isaac J. Wetherbee, a graduate of Baltimore College of Dental Surgery. The college was incorporated into Tufts College in 1899 and was located at 416 Huntington Avenue in Boston. By 1929, Tufts Medical and Dental College began an affiliation with the Boston Floating Hospital for Infants and Children, as well as the Boston Dispensary. This merger resulted in the creation of an association known as the New England Medical Center (NEMC), which would be the name of the hospital attached to the current day Tufts Dental School until the 1990s. The union was partially caused by the fire, and subsequent destruction of the USS Boston Floating Hospital (ID # 2366), a mobile hospital for sick children on Boston Harbor. In 1948, Tufts Medical and Dental College sold the Huntington Avenue buildings to Northeastern University, and relocated closer to NEMC at 136 Harrison Avenue. In 1954, Tufts Dental College became the "Tufts University School of Dental Medicine". The school would remain at the Harrison Avenue location until 1971, when it was moved to its current location of 1 Kneeland Street. The building was only 10 floors in height, but was designed with future expansion in mind. In 2009, the building was vertically expanded by 5 floors, and the design won multiple architectural awards. In 2013, the university announced plans to refurbish the third and fourth clinical floors, to match the newly renovated second floor.

== Admissions ==
For the 2018–2019 application cycle, 4,094 applications were received for the 202 seats available in the Class of 2023. The DAT Academic Average was 20, and the Total Science was 20.

While in the past international applicants were considered for admission to the School of Dental Medicine, for the 2012–2013 application cycle those applicants without US citizenship or permanent residency will not be considered for the DMD program.

== Student class profile ==
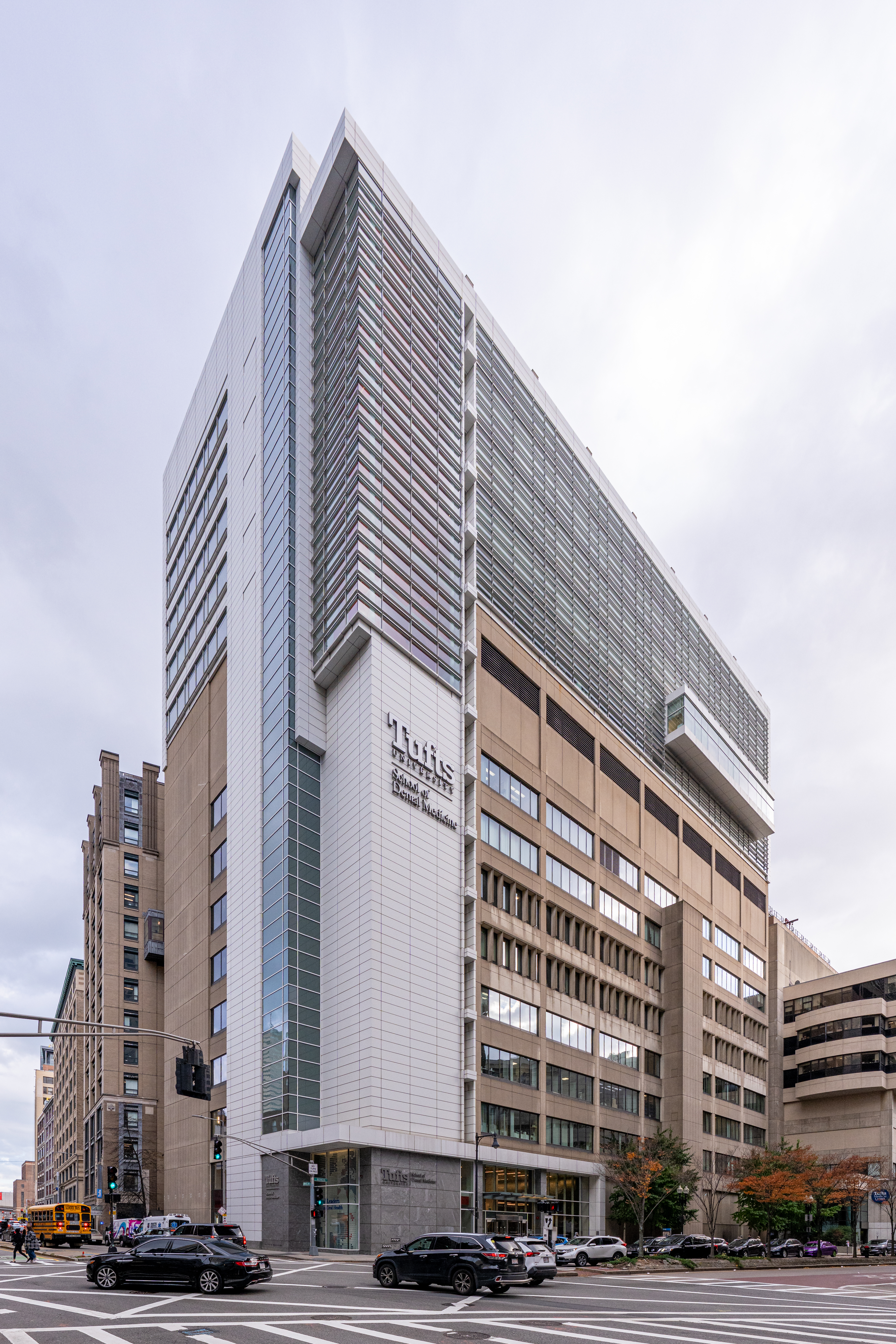
As seen from Stuart Street (2025)

There are approximately 4000 applicants each year and roughly 200 students enrolled per class, making it the second largest dental school in the United States. The Class of 2015 had an average age of 24; ranging from 21 to 38. The class was composed of students from 29 states.

The School has over 7,000 alumni composed of individuals from all fifty states and thirty-nine countries. Nearly half of the Class of 2015 identifies as Asian (45%) and 49% of the Class is female.

== Curriculum ==
The curriculum of Tufts University School of Dental Medicine (TUSDM) is a competency based curriculum. The D.M.D. program, which extends over a four-year period, consists of a series of:

1. didactic (lecture and seminar)
2. patient simulation (patient simulation clinic, introductory clinical experience, and workshop)
3. clinical (group practice, rotations and Community Service Learning Externship) experiences.

== Facilities ==
In 2009, Tufts Dental completed a $68 million, five-floor vertical expansion. The vertical expansion houses two new clinical patient floors, a new 108-chair simulation lab and teaching facilities for students, as well as a Continuing Education conference center and administrative offices.

Tufts University School of Dental Medicine pre-clinical simulation laboratory

The design for the five-story expansion, by ARC/Architectural Resources Cambridge, integrates contemporary forms and materials within the framework of the existing building. In contrast to the heavier forms of the existing structure, the vertical addition uses a glass and aluminum curtain wall system and white metal panels, which is extended to the street level. The existing egress stair at the corner of the building has also been transformed into a glass beacon that marks the gateway to the Tufts Health Sciences Boston Campus.

The project includes updates to the entire building's infrastructure, incorporating new elevators and updated life safety systems, as well as a new generator.

Additionally, the expansion has helped different departments work together more effectively with the use of two internal stairs, one connecting the clinical floors and a second connecting the administrative and Continuing Education departments.[15]

In January 2012, the school dedicated the periodontology library to Dr. Irving Glickman, who paved the way for the study of periodontology.

== Research ==
Areas of research at Tufts Dental include Bone Remodeling, Sjögren's Syndrome: Dry Mouth and Dry Eye, Dental Materials, Division of Public Health Research and Oral Medicine, Public Health and Community Service, Craniofacial and Molecular Genetics, Integrated Tissue Engineering, Biostatistics, Prosthodontics and Operative Dentistry, TMD and Orofacial Pain.

== Student organizations ==
The School of Dental Medicine has over 40 student organizations. Some of the organizations present at Tufts Dental include: Delta Sigma Delta (DSD), American Student Dental Association (ASDA), and the Bates Student Research Group.

American Student Dental Association (ASDA)

The American Student Dental Association was established in 1971 to represent, serve and support the needs and interests of dental students. As a national professional organization, ASDA provides a forum for expression of dental student concerns. ASDA currently has more than 14,000 predoctoral members at each of the 55 U.S. dental school chapters.

Bates-Student Research Group

The Bates Student Research Group (SRG) is a student-run organization that promotes student research in dentistry and its related disciplines. Our main purpose is to foster an environment whereby students interested in enriching their dental education through research are encouraged to do so.

== Dean of the School of Dental Medicine ==
Dr. Nadeem Karimbux was named the 17th Dean of the Tufts University School of Dental Medicine in July 2019. Dr. Karimbux previously had been the associate dean for academic affairs and a professor of periodontology at the School of Dental Medicine since 2012. Born in Nakuru, Kenya, Karimbux received his undergraduate degree from the University of Massachusetts at Amherst and his Doctor of Dental Medicine from Harvard School of Dental Medicine. He also earned a Masters of Medical Science in oral biology and Graduate Certificate in periodontology from Harvard School of Dental Medicine.
