= Popayán Archdiocesan Museum of Religious Art =

- Museo de Arte Religioso Arquidiocesano de Popayán
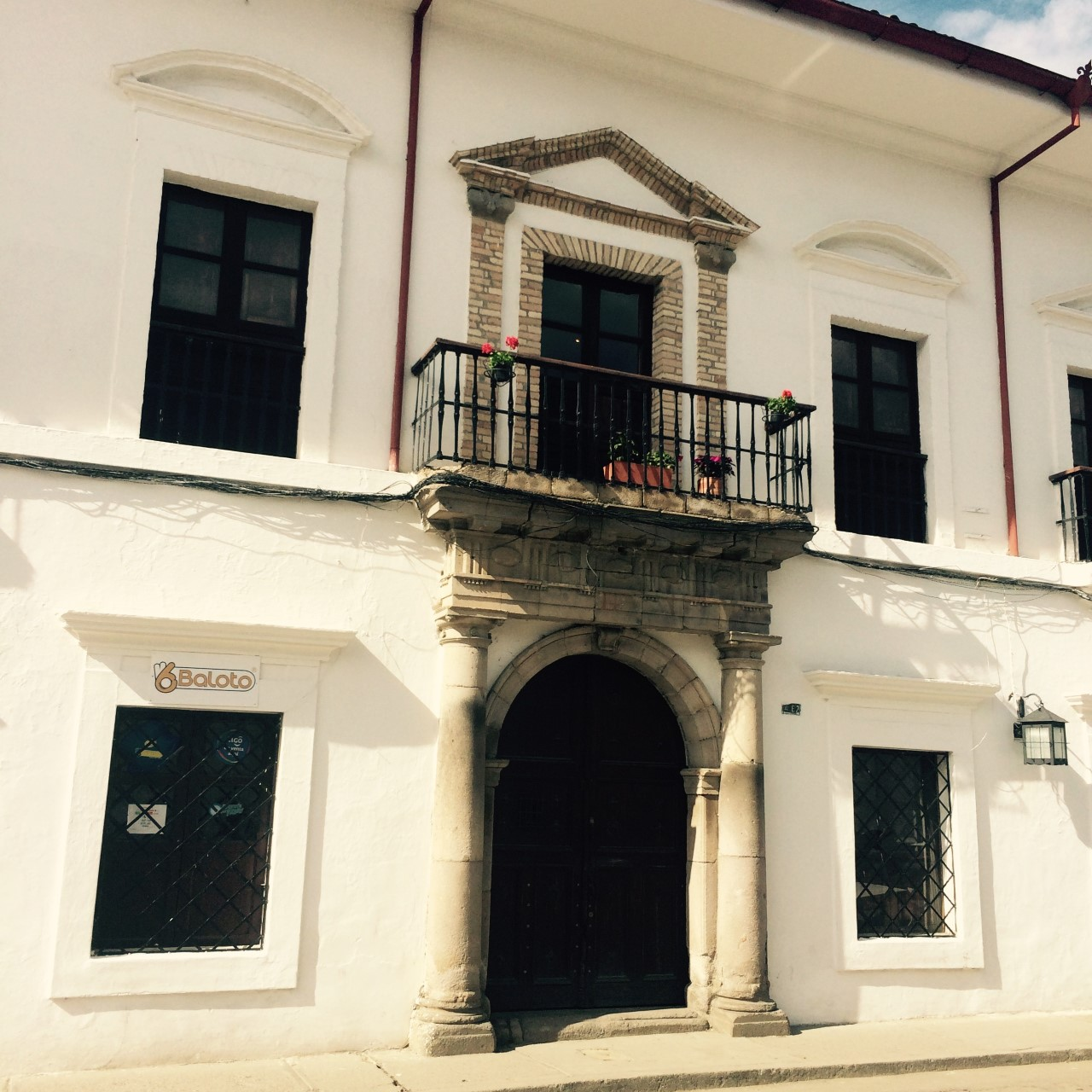
- Established: 1972
- Location: Popayán, Colombia
- Coordinates: 2.441819°N 76.604386°W
- Type: Religious Art Museum

The Popayán Archdiocesan Museum of Religious Art (Spanish: Museo de Arte Religioso Arquidiocesano de Popayán) is a museum located in the capital of the department of Cauca, Colombia. The museum is mainly dedicated to exhibit sacred art.

== History ==
The building where the museum is located used to be a house of the Arboleda family. The museum was founded in 1972 by Archbishop Miguel Angel Arce. After the 1983 Popayán Earthquake, the museum building suffered serious damage, part of the museum's collections were recovered and preserved in the Bank of the Republic. The museum is part of the List of Properties declared of Cultural Interest in the National Area (Spanish: Lista de Bienes declarados Bien de Interés Cultural de Ámbito Nacional) as of decree 2248 of December 11, 1996. In 2013, thieves stole several religious items from the museum, including archbishop's rings.

== Collections ==
The museum's collections include sculptures, jewelry, liturgical pieces, altars and paintings dating from the 17th to 18th centuries. The museum also conserves monstrances and ciboriums. The museum contains religious art by Quito artists from colonial times. The museum has a canvas of the Last Supper by the Ecuadorian artist Bernando Rodriguez. The museum contains two specimens of "Inmaculadas Legardianas". The museum contains a silver almoner, the painting of this almoner, elaborated on copper sheet, represents a saint Ecce Homo.
