= Alejandro Eder =

Colombian politician (born 1975)

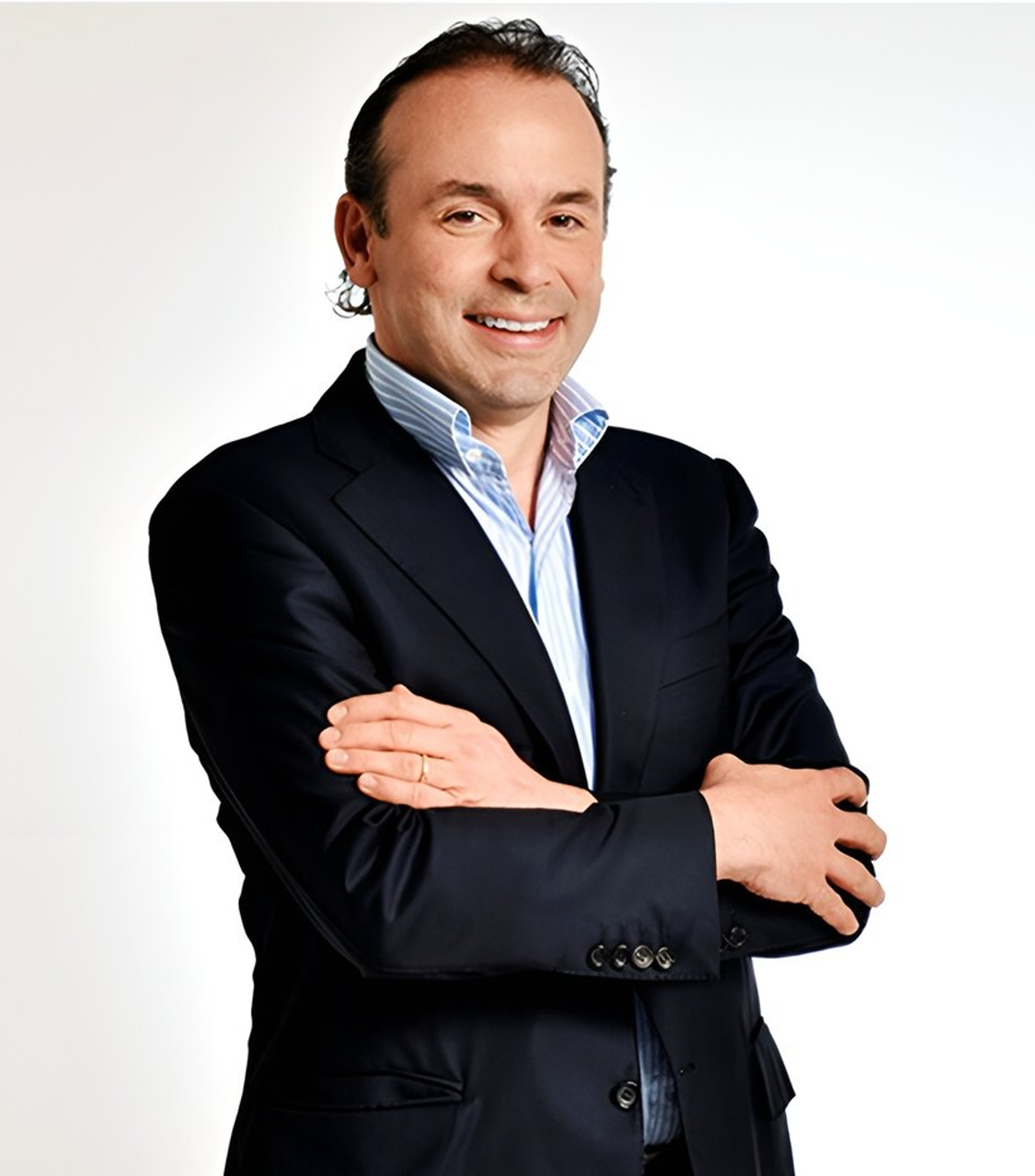

Mayor of Cali
- Incumbent
- Assumed office 1 January 2024
- Preceded by: Jorge Iván Ospina

Senior Presidential Advisor for Reintegration
- In office 21 September 2010 – 23 October 2014
- President: Juan Manuel Santos
- Preceded by: Position established
- Succeeded by: Camilo Granada

Personal details
- Born: Álvaro Alejandro Eder Garcés; 1 December 1975 (age 50) Washington, D.C., U.S.
- Spouse: Taliana Vargas (m. 2015)
- Children: 2
- Education: Columbia University (BSP); Columbia University (MIA)
- Occupation: Politician

Álvaro Alejandro Eder Garcés (born 1 December 1975) is a Colombian politician and specialist in international security policies. He was elected Mayor of Cali in October 2023 and assumed office on 1 January 2024. From 2010 to 2014 he served as Senior Presidential Advisor for Reintegration.

He is part of the fifth generation of the Eder family in Colombia as a descendant of James Martin Eder as well as Henry James Eder, a former Mayor of Cali.

In the 2023 mayoral election, his candidacy was backed by the Conservador, Cambio Radical, Colombia Justa Libres, Nuevo Liberalismo and Colombia Renaciente parties. Many Dignidad y Compromiso voters and Centro Democrático leaders also supported him. He is a strong critic of President Gustavo Petro. In 2024 he appointed activist Johana Caicedo Sinisterra as Secretary of Peace.

== Biography ==
=== Early Years and Family ===
He was born on 1 December 1975 in the city of Washington D. C. (United States), and is the son of Henry Eder, who was mayor of Cali for the period 1986-1988, and the grandson of Harold Eder, founder of Ingenios Manuelita S.A. and the first kidnap victim of the FARC-EP in 1965, who died when his captors deprived him of medical attention. The M-19 attempted to kidnap his mother and later kidnapped an aunt.

He completed his secondary education at the Colegio Bolívar in Cali. He studied Philosophy and International Relations at Hamilton College, and specialised in the Politics of International Security and Conflict Resolution, obtaining a Master's degree in International Relations from Columbia University.

On August 15, 2015 he married the model and actress Taliana Vargas. The wedding took place in Palmira in the Valle del Cauca Department, at the Ingenio Manuelita, and the couple have two children

Party political offices
Preceded by New political movement	Let's revive Cali nominee for Mayor of Cali; 2023	Incumbent
Political offices
Preceded by Jorge Iván Ospina	Mayor of Cali; 2024-2027	Incumbent
