= Johana Caicedo Sinisterra =

Colombian politician (born 1980)

Secretary for Peace and Social Welfare
- In office 2024–2026
- Appointed by: Alejandro Eder
- Constituency: Cali

Personal details
- Born: 1980 (age 45–46) Guapi, Cauca
- Spouse: Sami Arizabaleta (2020-present)
- Education: University of Valle BA in philosophy, MA in education
- Occupation: Activist, educator

Johana Caicedo Sinisterra (born 1980) is an Afro-Colombian politician and human rights activist. She stands against racist, sexist and homophobic discrimination and uses education as a way to promote tolerance and reconciliation in tense urban areas. She was Secretary for Peace and Social Welfare in the city of Cali from 2024 to 2026 and pursued a doctorate in social science.

== Biography ==
=== Early life ===
Johana Caicedo Sinisterra was born in 1980 in Guapi to Mayimbú and Aurora, who had a mattress-making company. She was living with 53 other children, 9 of whom were her siblings. She was 16 when her mother Aurora first encouraged her to leave Guapi to pursue education. In 2003, when she was 23, she moved to Medellín where she encountered racism for the first time : she was mocked and assaulted.

In 2004, Caicedo left Medellín for Cali and applied to the University of Valle in political science. She wasn't accepted in her chosen subject but was allowed to start an undergraduate degree in philosophy. As her family couldn't help her financially she found a low-paying job that put her in dire straits. To earn more and live better, Caicedo launched a small business on campus: a sandwich shop called Chuzo. The shop was a success and became an employer of poor students like Caicedo herself. Later in life, she said that women who want to live in a better world must build it themselves.

=== Building a home in Cali ===
Once she could find a steady job and live more comfortably in Cali, she donated Chuzo to new students who struggled to find employment. By her own admission, Johana Caicedo Sinisterra does not care for money and, rather, wants to create opportunities for other underprivileged people.

In 2009 she came out as a lesbian on campus, in response to rumors regarding her sexuality. She claimed she was the target of racist, sexist and homophobic discrimination. In her work, she has an intersectional approach to conflict analysis and resolution.

In 2011, she met Sami Arizabaleta and they married in 2020. They have two children.

After she earned her bachelor's degree in philosophy, she went on to get a master's degree in education. In 2019 she was pursuing a PhD in social science.

== Politics and activism ==
=== Early career : 2004-2015 ===
Johana Caicedo Sinisterra started her activist career in University when she became a student's representative on the Academic Board. As such, she made the University lower tuition fees for students of african descent. She founded Somos Identidad, an association whose goal is to protect student's LGBTQ rights. She also launched the ENEUA Meeting : Encuentro Nacional de Estudiantes Universitarios Afrocolombianos (transl. Afro-columbian Students National Conference).

As a young graduate, she started working with citizen groups from the Aguablanca neighborhood to promote tolerance. She was motivated by the possibility of workng and living together with people who don't share the same culture or aspirations. She then worked with the International Organization for Migration and for ACDI/VOCA, where she saw how social change and peace could be built by collective work.

As an educator and activist, Caicedo traveled to The Hague in order to mediate conflicts between Revolutionary Armed Forces of Colombia and the columbian government.

=== Civil service ===
In 2016, Caicedo became a public servant under Cali's mayor Maurice Armitage. She led the Jóvenes en Acción workshop (transl. youth in action) and was a council member for the Secretary of Peace and Social Affairs. In 2019, she became Undersecretary for Gender Equality in Cali and fought for better ways to support victims of domestic abuse. She also created funding schemes for entrepreneurs, boosted the education of women and raised awareness about violence towards women.

In 2024, Mayor Alejandro Eder appointed Johana Caicedo Sinisterra as Secretary of Peace and Urban Culture for Cali. As such, she worked on social harmony between communities, human rights and social issues within the city. When she first came into office, she estimated her biggest challenge would be preventing gangs from forcefully enrolling children. Cali's population is divided and exposed to urban violence, Caicedo's goal was "reconciliation", in her own words. To achieve that goal, she promoted dialogue and mediated conflict between communities using participatory democracy tools and practice. 9 billion pesos were budgeted for this objective alone in 2025. Some of that money was used to erect the Carpa de la Paz (transl. tent of peace) in the Potrerogrande neighborhood in order to make the people participate in cultural and artistic activities, mentoring and mental health counselling. In the end, urban violence did decrease.

In 2026, Caicedo put an end to her public service career in order to focus on research. She resigned as Secretary of Peace while the entire mayoral team was being shuffled and re-appointed.
