= Irving Glickman =

American periodontist (1914-1972)

Doctor Irving Glickman
- Born: January 17, 1914; Williamsburg, New York, U.S.
- Died: October 2, 1972 (aged 58); Boston, Massachusetts, U.S.
- Education: Tufts University School of Dental Medicine
- Occupation: Periodontist
- Years active: 1941–1972
- Spouse: Violeta Arboleda (m. 1954)
- Children: 2

Irving Glickman (January 17, 1914 – October 2, 1972) was an American clinical researcher described as "the father of periodontology" and an author. He was one of the first to classify furcation defects and the role of occlusal trauma on periodontal disease.

== Career ==
In 1941, Glickman joined the Tufts University faculty and became chair of the Department of Periodontology in 1948.

In the 1950s, Glickman developed the bone factor concept about the factors that determine the severity of periodontal destruction, and developed a classification system for furcation involvement

In 1965, Glickman proposed a theory involving the relation of occlusal trauma to periodontal disease which led to further research in animal models.

=== Philanthropy ===
Glickman served as the chairman of the Combined Jewish Philanthropies (CJP) of Boston.

== Personal life and death ==
In 1954, Glickman married his student, Violeta Arboleda. Violeta had five sisters including Esmeralda, and Mireya. Glickman and Arboleda had a son, Alan, and a daughter, Denise.

He died on October 2, 1972 at Tufts–New England Medical Center in Boston.

=== Legacy ===
In January 2012, Tufts University School of Dental Medicine dedicated the periodontology library to Glickman, naming it in his honor.

== Selected works ==
- Clinical Periodontology (originally published as Glickman's Clinical Periodontology, the Fifth Edition was dedicated to his memory. The book continued to be published under the editorship of Fermin A. Carranza, and the title changed to Carranza's Clinical Periodontology )
