= Jorge Iván Ospina =

Colombian politician (born 1965)

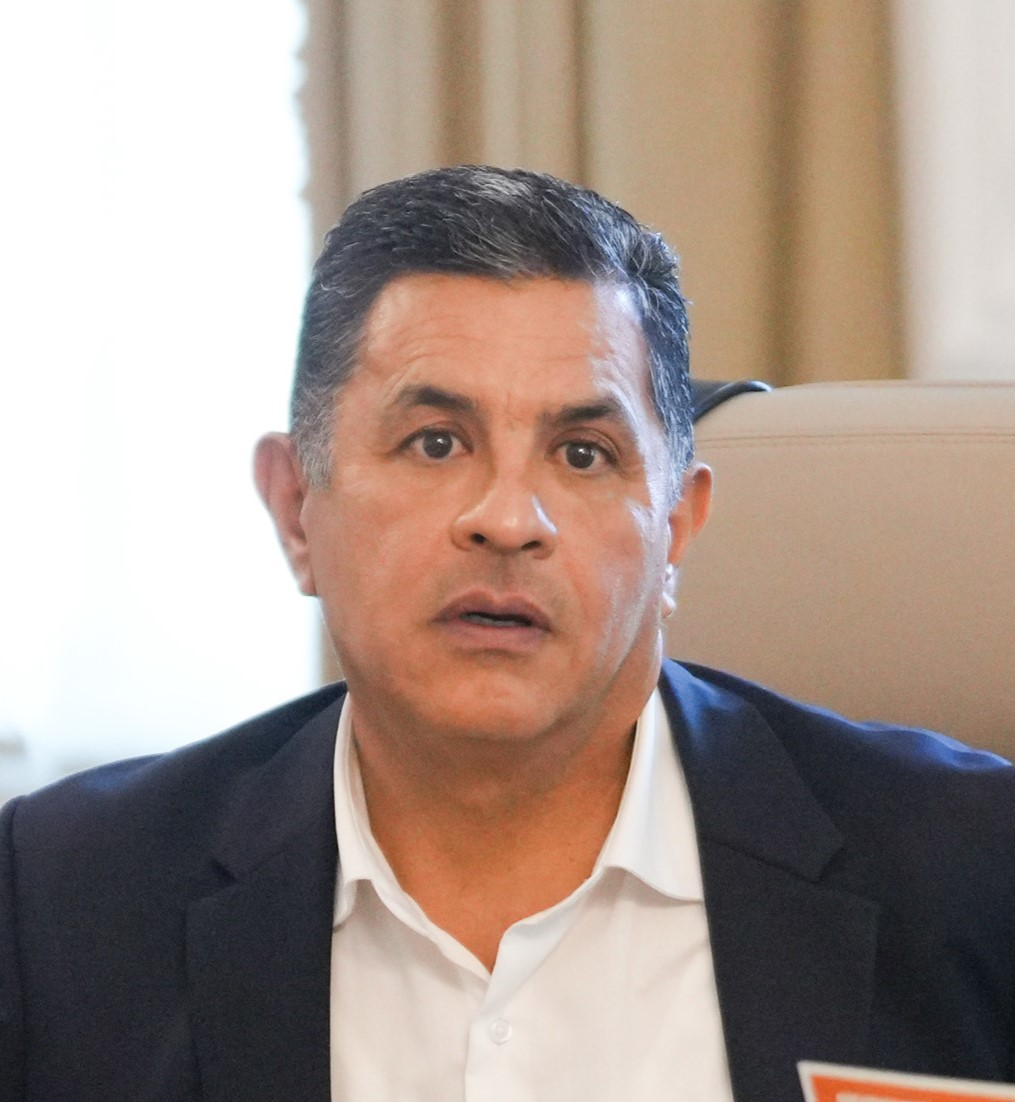

Colombian Ambassador to Palestine
- In office 26 May 2025 – 7 August 2026
- President: Gustavo Petro
- Preceded by: Position established

Mayor of Cali
- In office 1 January 2020 – 31 December 2023
- Preceded by: Maurice Armitage
- Succeeded by: Alejandro Eder
- In office 1 January 2008 – 31 December 2011
- Preceded by: Sabas Tafur
- Succeeded by: Rodrigo Guerrero

Senator of Colombia
- In office 20 July 2014 – 15 May 2019

Personal details
- Born: Jorge Iván Ospina Gómez; 1 October 1965 (age 61) Cali, Cauca Valley, Colombia
- Party: Green Alliance
- Education: University of Havana
- Profession: Surgeon; politician

Jorge Iván Ospina Gómez (born 1 October 1965) is a former Colombian Senator and former mayor of Santiago de Cali, the third-largest city in Colombia and the economic hub for Southwestern Colombia. Ospina is also a doctor who has worked in the hospital of the University of Valle, known as the Hospital Universitario del Valle Evaristo Garcia. Ospina's father, Ivan Marino Ospina, was a guerrilla fighter and co-founder of the revolutionary group 19th of April Movement (M-19). Ospina was sworn in as mayor on 1 January 2019 and stayed in position until 31 December 2023.

== Election ==
Ospina defeated Francisco Lloreda in the 2007 Colombian regional and municipal elections, which were held on 28 October. Ospina won with 44% of the vote, leaving Lloreda with 39%, and the remaining 17% being distributed amongst the other 6 candidates.

Political offices
Preceded by Sabas Tafur	Mayor of Cali; 2008–2011	Succeeded by Rodrigo Guerrero
Preceded by Maurice Armitage	Mayor of Cali; 2020–2023	Succeeded by Alejandro Eder
