= Mireya Arboleda =

Colombian classical pianist (1928–2021)

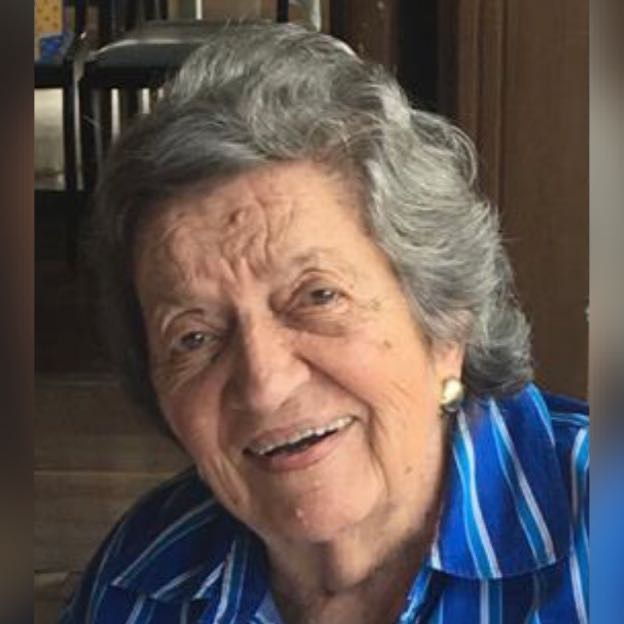
- Born: María Mireya Arboleda Cadavid; July 1, 1928; Palmira, Valle del Cauca, Colombia
- Died: February 21, 2021 (aged 92); Bogotá, D.C., Colombia
- Occupation: Classical pianist
- Spouse: Flavio Cruz Dominguez
- Children: 2

María Mireya Arboleda Cadavid (July 1, 1928 – February 21, 2021) was a Colombian classical pianist and teacher.

== Early career and education ==
Maria Mireya Arboleda Cadavid was born in Palmira, Valle del Cauca, Colombia on July 1, 1928, to Fernando Arboleda López, the mayor of Palmira and Rosa Cadavid Medina along with five other sisters, Esmeralda, Pubenza, Fabiola, Violeta, and Soffy. She was named after the poem Mireya by Frédéric Mistral.

Arboleda began studying music when she was 6 years old at the Antonio María Valencia de Cali Conservatory. There, she received her diploma in Higher Studies. She went on to study at the New England Conservatory of Music in Boston, a very prestigious music school. At the conservatory, Arboleda received her Title in Music and Artistic Diploma in 1957 under the tutelage of Hungarian pianist Miklos Schwalb. Also in 1957, Arboleda participated in the International Piano Competition in Rio de Janeiro which inspired her to move to Paris and earn a Masters of Piano Studies at the Conservatoire de Paris, another very prestigious music school. At the conservatory, Arboleda became the protegé of critically acclaimed pianists such as French musician Nadia Boulanger and French-Lithuanian musician Vlado Perlemuter.

Arboleda's return to Colombia following her studying abroad was "a revelation for those who still doubted women's abilities".

== Career ==
As a concert pianist, Arboleda performed recitals and concerts in international venues such as the Isabella Stewart Gardner Museum in Boston, The Town Hall in New York City, the Teresa Carreño Cultural Complex in Caracas, and the Centre for Fine Arts in Brussels. She also performed many times in her home-country of Colombia such as concerts at the Luis Ángel Arango Library in Bogotá, and the León de Greiff Library in Medellín. Arboleda later became a head music professor at the National University of Colombia, spending around 30 years of her life in teaching altogether.

== Personal life ==
Arboleda was married to Flavio Cruz Domínguez, a lawyer, who later died. The couple had two children, Santiago and José Antonio. On February 21, 2021, Arboleda died at age 92 in Bogotá.

She is first cousins with former Cali Mayor Maurice Armitage.
