= Norman Maurice Armitage =

Colombian politician (born 1945)

Maurice Armitage
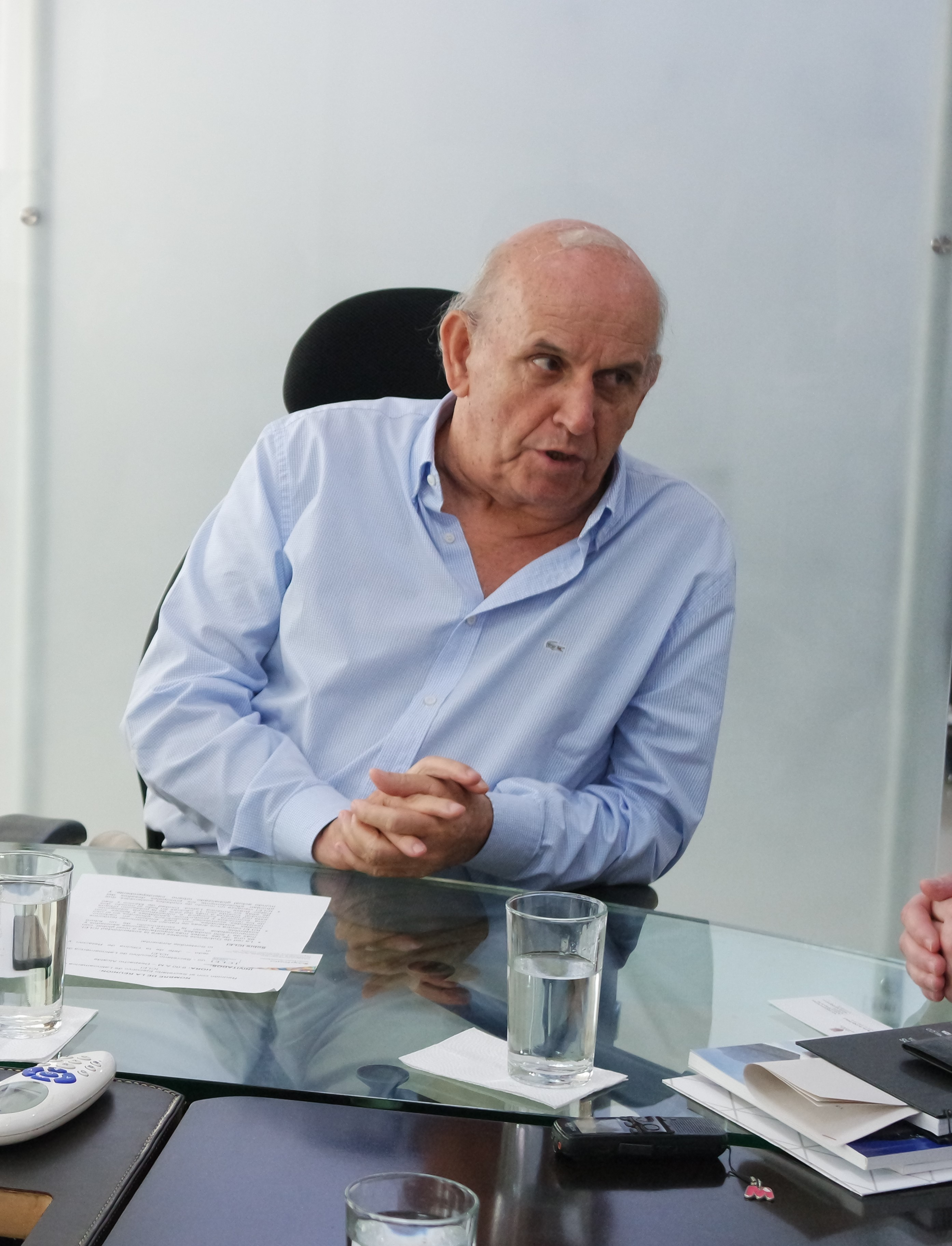
- Armitage in 2018

Mayor of Cali
- In office 1 January 2016 – 31 December 2019
- Preceded by: Rodriguo Gerrero
- Succeeded by: Jorge Iván Ospina

Personal details
- Born: Norman Maurice Armitage; 13 June 1945 (age 81) Cali, Cauca Valley, Colombia
- Party: Independent
- Spouse: Patricia Tella Doronsorro
- Education: University of Valle; University San Buenaventura
- Profession: Entrepreneur; politician
- Website: Maurice Armitage

Norman Maurice Armitage (born 13 June 1945) is a Colombian businessman, politician, and philanthropist who served as the mayor of Cali, the third-largest city in Colombia and the economic hub of Southwestern Colombia from 2016 to 2019.

== Education and early career ==
Armitage studied law at the university and then went to work in steel mining. He bought his first company SIDOC (Siderúrgica de Occidente) which he still owns. Armitage also owns Ingenio de Occidente which is an Agribusiness company whose main product is refined sugar and owns 3,000 hectares of land used for production. Armitage is also a shareholder of Cementos San Marcos and is a part of the board of directors of the Cali Chamber of Commerce and Fenalco Valle.

=== Social Work ===
Armitage is well known for his philanthropy and social work in the suburbs, such as Siloé. He endorsed the peace process to end the armed conflict in Colombia and volunteered to put his foundation to use to help destroy weapons when the (M19) demobilised. All of the companies owned by Armitage split a share of the profits with their employees every 3 months and he advocates paying more than the standard minimum wage to his workers.

== Mayor of Cali (2016-2019) ==
=== Peace in Colombia ===
Due to his past experiences, including the experience of being kidnapped, Armitage became more involved in charitable causes and organizations that sought to bring peace to Colombia. Subsequently when President Juan Manuel Santos announced to the world and to the Colombian people that he was holding peace talks with the FARC in Havana, Cuba, Maurice Armitage formed part of a group of victims who travelled to Havana to take part in the peace talks and help the Government.

== Personal life ==
Armitage is married to Patricia Tello Dorronsoro and they have two daughters. Armitage's father was English and his mother was from Antioquia. Armitage was a cousin of former Colombian senator and politician Esmeralda Arboleda Cadavid, as well as Arboleda's sister, Mireya Arboleda, a classical pianist.
