= Jan Lindhe =

Swedish periodontist

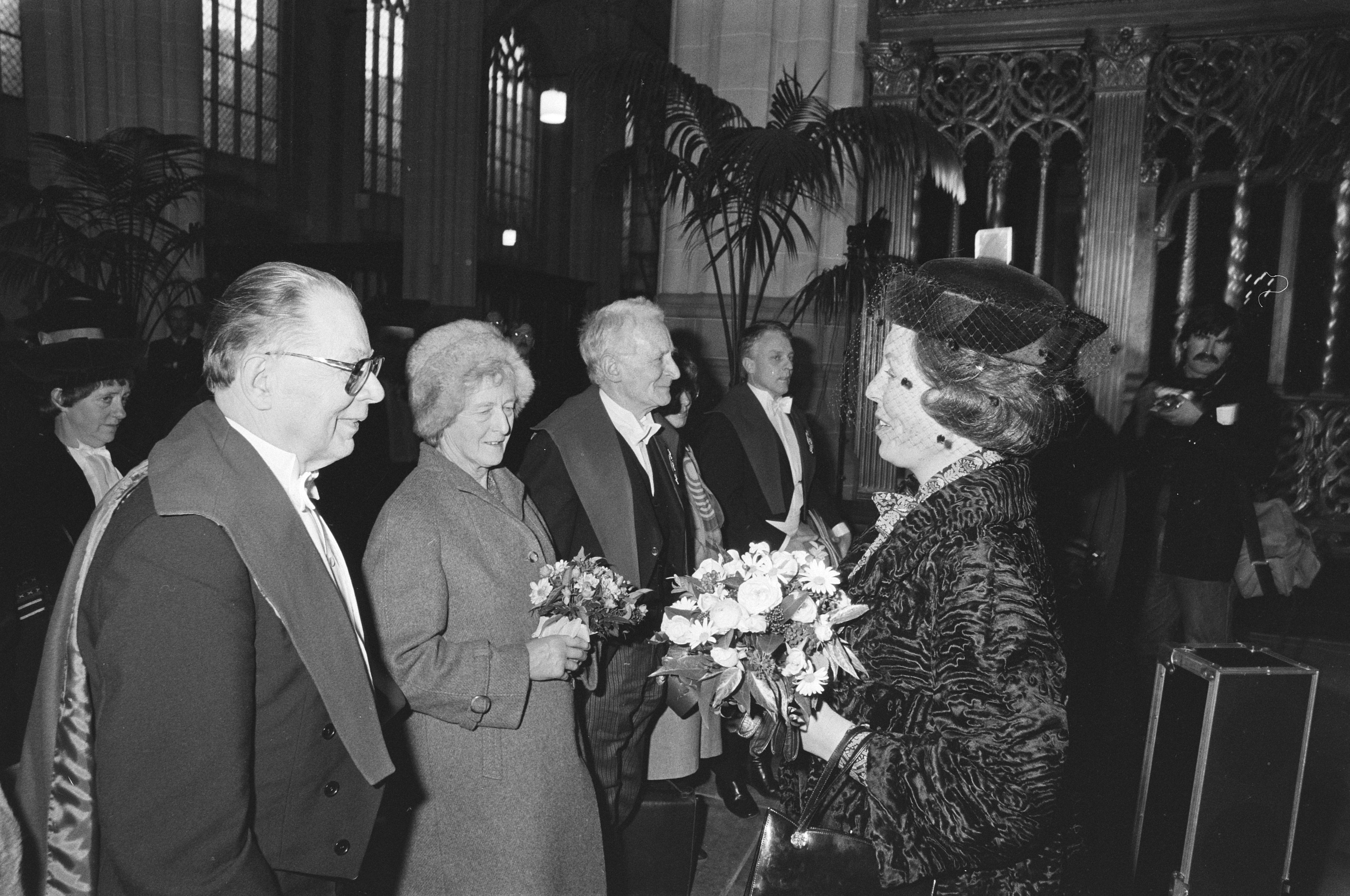
- Lindhe (centre right) receiving an honorary doctorate in Amsterdam (1982)
- Born: 1935 (age 90–91); Helsingborg
- Spouse: Annalena Lindhe-Rosenqvist
- Children: 3
- Scientific career
- Fields: Periodontology

Jan Lindhe (born 1935) is a Swedish periodontist and a clinical research scientist specializing in periodontology.

== Education & career ==
Lindhe graduated from the Royal School of Dentistry in Malmö, Sweden. He completed specialty training in oral surgery and periodontology at the University of Lund. He began his career as a professor of roentgenology (now referred to as oral and maxillofacial radiology) in 1957 at Lund. The title of his 1964 doctoral thesis at Lund was Orthogonal cutting of dentine: a methodological study. He then became assistant professor of periodontology in 1964. In 1967, after spending 6 years studying oral radiology, oral surgery and periodontology, he moved to the University of Umeå to become associate professor and chair of periodontics. In 1969, he became professor and chair of periodontics at the University of Gothenburg, remaining there until 2001. Lindhe was elected dean of the School of Dentistry by the faculty at the University of Gothenburg in 1977.

Lindhe became dean at the School of Dental Medicine at the University of Pennsylvania in 1983. He returned to the University of Gothenburg in 1988. He keeps close ties to periodontology programs in the United States such as the University of Southern California.

Lindhe was inducted as an honorary member of the American Academy of Periodontology in 1982 for his outstanding contributions to the art and science of periodontology. He was also awarded the William J. Gies award in 2008.

== Personal life ==
He is married to Annalena Lindhe-Rosenqvist and together, they have three children: Pär, Anna-Maria and Anna-Karin.
