= Tadea Álvarez Lozano =

María Tadea Álvarez y Lozano
- Born: Santa Fe de Bogotá, Viceroyalty of New Granada
- Occupations: Aristocrat, philanthropist
- Known for: Prominent figure in the Neogranadine independence movement; member of the Álvarez family
- Spouse: Juan María Pardo y Pardo
- Parent: Manuel de Bernardo Álvarez (father)
- Relatives: Jorge Miguel Lozano de Peralta (grandfather); Antonio Nariño (first cousin); Antonio Ricaurte (first cousin); José María Vergara y Lozano (first cousin)
- Family: Marquesses of San Jorge

María Tadea Álvarez y Lozano was a neogranadine aristocrat, known for being one of the most distinguished women in Santa Fe (present-day-Bogotá) in the viceroyalty of New Granada and the beginnings of Gran Colombia.

Tadea was the daughter of prominent politician Manuel de Bernardo Álvarez del Casal, Governor President of the State of Cundinamarca, who was sentenced and executed by Pablo Morillo during the reconquest of New Granada. And a descendant of Spanish nobility, more specifically with the Marquis of San Jorge, Jorge Miguel Lozano de Peralta, this marquis was the last nobleman officially recognized by the Spanish Crown in New Granada and is now an iconic character in Colombian history. She was placed at the heart of the independence events because all her family was involved (Álvarez family, Nariño family, and Lozano family). She married Juan María Pardo y Pardo, a criollo physician and politician, who was a signatory of the Act of Independence on July 20, 1810, in Santafé de Bogotá, making him a founding father of Colombia. She had several children and descendants who had notable careers in politics and public service, even today.

Álvarez Lozano was a first cousin of several renowned independence leaders and founding fathers of Colombia, including Antonio Nariño, Antonio Ricaurte, and José María Vergara.
