= Nariño (disambiguation) =

Nariño is one of the 32 departments of Colombia.

Nariño may also refer to:

== People ==
- Antonio Nariño (1765–1824), early Colombian political and military leader

== Colombia ==
- Nariño, Antioquia, a town and municipality
- Nariño, Cundinamarca, a town and municipality
- Nariño, Nariño, a town and municipality
- Nariño (TransMilenio), a bus station in Bogotá
- Nariño culture, a civilization of western Colombia
