= Nariño family =

Colombia, since 18th century

Nariño Family
- Aristocracy Political family
- Country: Colombia
- Current region: Cundinamarca & Americas
- Origin: Galicia, Spain
- Founder: Vicente Nariño y Vásquez
- Members: Antonio Nariño
- Connected families: Álvarez family Dominguez family Ortega family Vásquez family

The Nariño family of Colombia was a prominent political family in the early history of Colombia. The Nariños have their origins in Galicia, Spain. The family grew wealthy in the 18th century. They were considered one of the most important families of the viceroyalty of New Granada.

== History ==
The first person of this lineage moved to New Granada in 1751 as a Spanish royal Accountant of the Matrix Arcs of New Granada. The family brought together a circle of enlightened liberals to discuss various topics, their house was a meeting place for liberals of the time.. Antonio Nariño, a well-known a pro-Colombian independence hailed from this family.

Antonio Nariño founded the influential pro-indepence print shop "La Patriótica" and acquired an license from the government that allowed him to print. This enterprise failed after Nariño was persecuted for his inflammatory Derechos del hombre in 1793. He translated the French Declaration of the Rights of Man from its original into Spanish and printed several copies. He then circulated these pamphlets among friends, families and like-minded people. Copies of the pamphlet created a stirring in the political mentalities of the time. The government soon discovered the material, and any copy that was found was burned. Nariño was arrested on August 29, 1794.

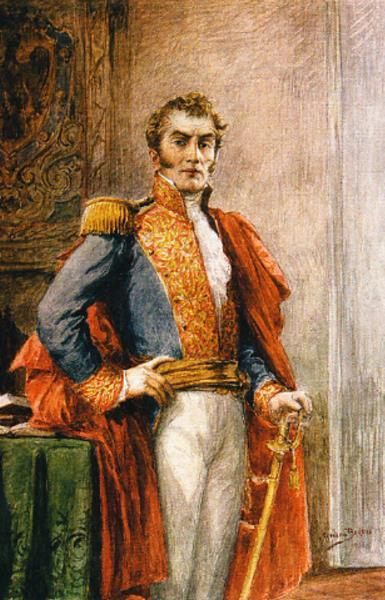
Ricardo Acevedo Bernal (1867-1930) Watercolor of Antonio Nariño. Original located in the Jockey Club, Bogotá, Colombia.

Antonio's family was persecuted by the Peacemaker Pablo Morillo and the royalist reaction against the patriots. It can be said that they participated in the heroic life of Antonio and of many heroes of Independence and each of them contributed their share to the cause and independence efforts.

Later, the Oidor Figueroa raided the family's house in front of the Plaza de las Hierbas, and confiscated their library owned in a house in front of the same square, today the current headquarters of the Jockey Club one of the most traditional and prestigious social institutions in the country, an exclusive club of the Colombian elite.

Vicente Nariño Ortega, to whom Colombia owes the National Library together with its founder Manuel del Socorro Rodriguez, also enriched the nariñista lineage that his father bequeathed to him. In this way, he continued the Library of Nariño confiscated by the judge Mosquera y Figueroa in the house of the Mercado de las Yerbas and as an intellectual and bibliographer he took the first steps for the national library institution that culminated in the Luis angel arango library.

== Toponymy ==
- La Milagrosa Museum built in 1767 devoted to the memory of Antonio Nariño.
- Nariño species of bird.
- Casa de Nariño Official residence and office of the President of Colombia.
- Nariño Department, Colombia.
- Nariño Antioquia, Colombia.
- Nariño Municipality, Nariño Department, Colombia/
- Nariño Municipality, Cundinamarca, Colombia.
- Antonio Nariño University
- Nariño

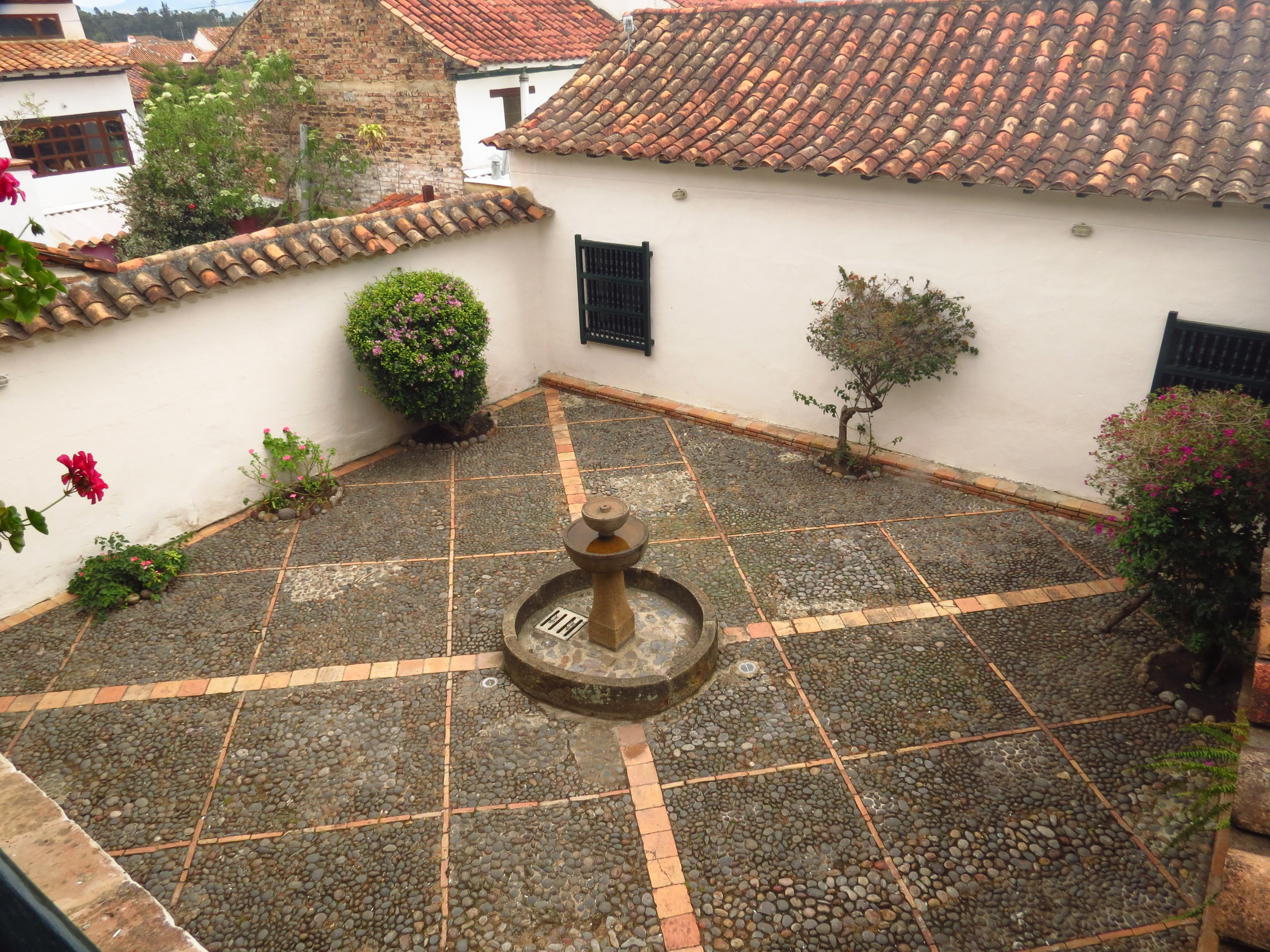
Nariño Monument, Bogotá, Colombia.

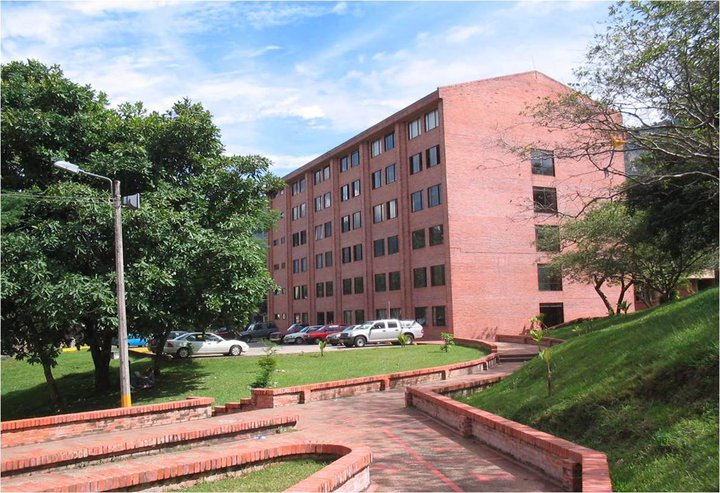
Antonio Narino University, August 2011
