= Los Toros de Fucha =

Spanish-language newspaper

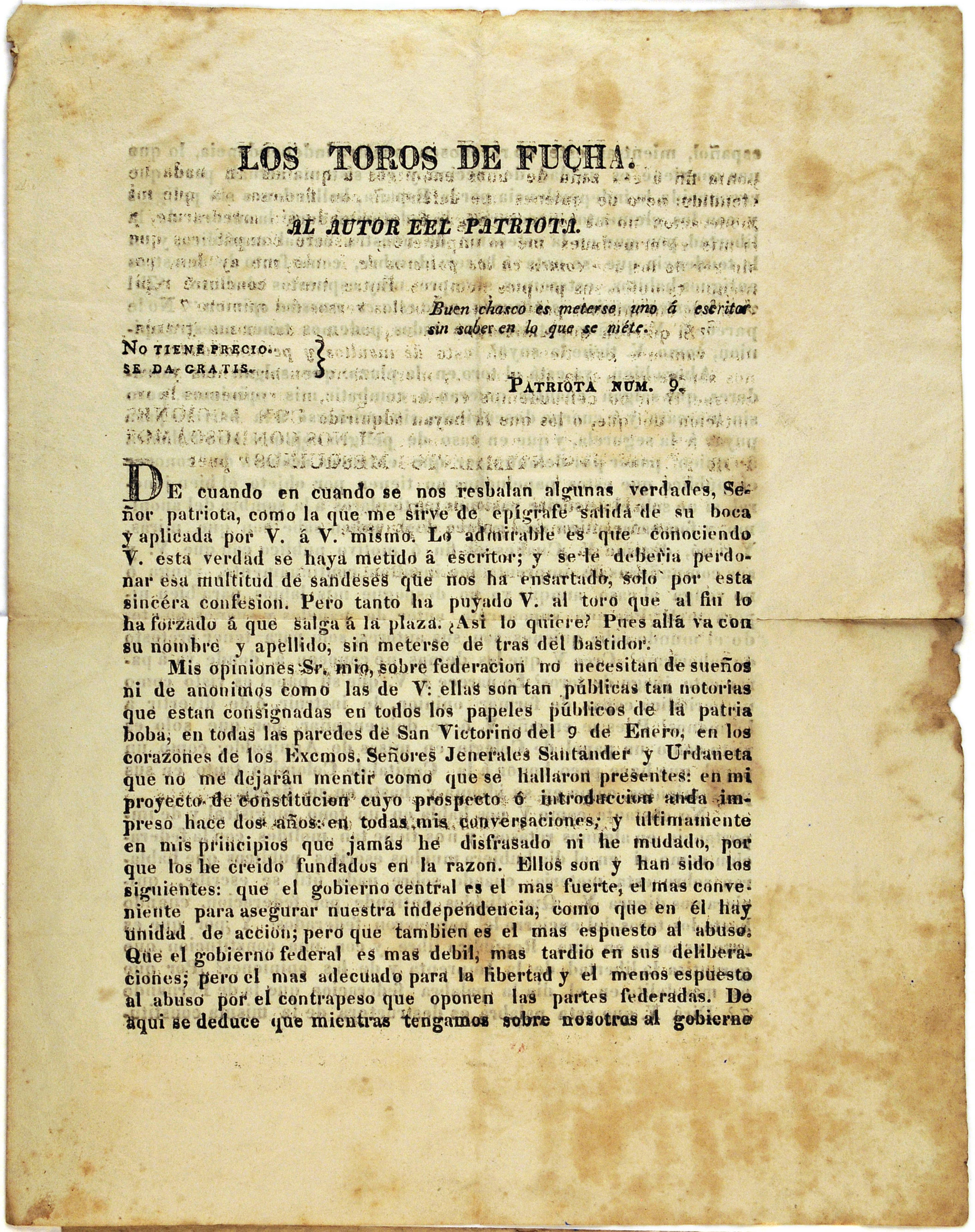
- Front page of the newspaper on 5 March 1823
- Founder: Antonio Nariño
- Founded: March 5, 1823
- Ceased publication: Early April 1823
- Language: Spanish
- Headquarters: Bogotá, Colombia

Los Toros de Fucha was a Spanish language New Granada newspaper founded and directed by the Colombian hero Antonio Nariño in 1823. This publication contains three serial publications directly responding to the patriotic newspaper El Patriota: Primera corrida, Segunda corrida and Tercera corrida. Each edition was produced by Espinosa Printing Office. Although it was a short-lived publication, all editions were widely disseminated and circulated free of charge in the Plaza de Bogotá in order to express opposition to the power Francisco de Paula Santander.
