= Álvarez family =

Prominent family in the early History of Colombia

- Aristocracy, political family
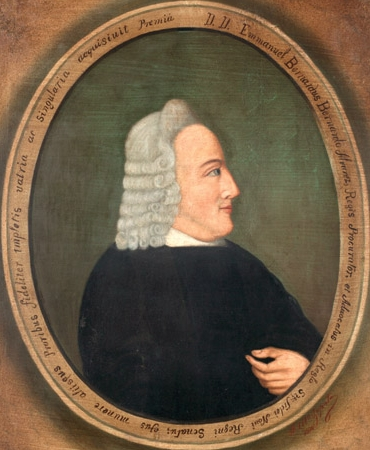
- Country: Colombia
- Current region: Cundinamarca
- Origin: Spain
- Founded: 1730
- Founder: Manuel de Bernardo Álvarez del Casal
- Members: Tadea Álvarez Lozano
- Connected families: Nariño Family; Lozano de Peralta family
- Dissolution: 1810

The Álvarez family was one of the most bureaucratic families of the 18th and 19th centuries in the Kingdom and Republic of New Granada.

== History ==
During the late colonial period of Colombia, regional clans raised to powerful administrative positions to acquire steady income and wealth. The founder of this family was an influential criollo Manuel de Bernardo Álvarez del Casal fiscal of the Royal Audiencia of Bogotá in 1736 to 1755, his sons married aristocrats and important figures involved in the economy and politics starting a "bureaucratic dynasty" from 1730 to 1810. The Spanish kings needed these clans to generate stability in the new American kingdoms.

The family consisted in civil servants tied together through marriage with important regional and local clans to control vitals segments of state and society in New Granada. A family of lawyers that used their networks to get access to many bureaucratic jobs.

== Notable members ==
- Manuel de Bernardo Álvarez del Casal
- Antonio Nariño
