= Brigadier general =

Senior rank in the armed forces

Brigadier general or brigade general is a military rank used in many countries. The rank is usually above a colonel, and below a major general or divisional general. When appointed to a field command, a brigadier general is typically in command of a brigade consisting of around 4,000 troops (two regiments or four battalions).

== Variants ==
=== Brigadier general ===
Brigadier general (Brig. Gen.) is a military rank used in many countries. The rank originates from the Old European System. It is the lowest ranking general officer in some countries, usually sitting between the ranks of colonel and major general. When appointed to a field command, a brigadier general is typically in command of a brigade consisting of around 4,000 troops (four battalions).

In some countries, this rank is given the name of brigadier, which is usually equivalent to brigadier general in the armies of nations that use the rank.

The rank can be traced back to the militaries of Europe where a "brigadier general", or simply a "brigadier", would command a brigade in the field.

In the first quarter of the 20th century, British and Commonwealth armies used the rank of brigadier general as a temporary appointment, or as an honorary appointment on retirement; in the 1920s this practice changed to the use of brigadier, which was not classed as a general officer.

=== Brigade general ===
Brigade general is the rank of a brigade commander in countries where the French Revolutionary System's general officer rank designation is used.

The rank name général de brigade (transl. brigade general) was first used in the French revolutionary armies.

It used both brigadier general and major general because it is used for the designated rank of the general officers that the country stipulates as brigade commanders' class by law.

== By country ==
=== Argentina ===
The Brigadier General was the highest rank in the Argentine Army until 1882, when it was replaced by Lieutenant General. In 1945, the Argentine Air Force was created and Brigadier General was established as its highest rank. Unlike other armed forces of the World, the rank of brigadier general is actually the highest rank in the Air Force. This is due to the use of the rank of brigadier and its derivatives to designate all general officers in the Air Force: brigadier (lowest general officer); brigadier-major (middle); and brigadier-general (highest). The rank of brigadier general is reserved for the Chief General Staff of the Air Force, as well as the Chief of the Joint General Staff if he should be an Air Force officer.

=== Australia ===
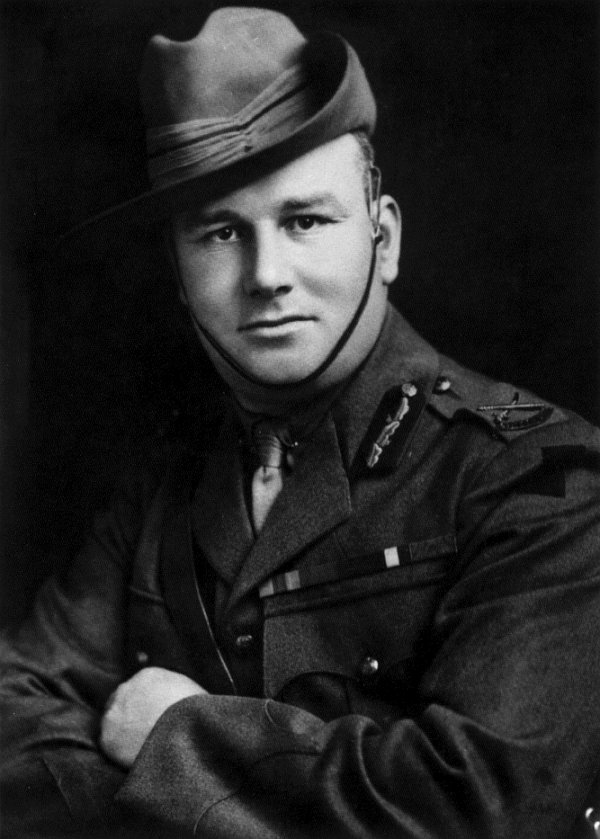
Australian Army Brigadier General Harold "Pompey" Elliott

In the Australian Imperial Force during World War I, the rank of brigadier general was always temporary and held only while the officer was posted to a particular task, typically the command of a brigade. (Until 1915, Australian brigades were commanded by colonels.) When posted elsewhere, the rank would be relinquished and the former rank resumed. This policy prevented an accumulation of high-ranking general officers brought about by the relatively high turnover of brigade commanders. Brigadier general was also used as an honorary rank on retirement.

The rank insignia was like that of the current major general, but without the star/pip. (Note: Australian Army rank insignia for 2LT, LT, CAPT, LTCOL, COL, BRIG, MAJGEN and GEN use the Order of the Bath star, which is commonly referred to as a "pip".) Brigadier generals wore the same gorget patches (a line of gold oak leaf embroidery down the centre), cap badge (crossed sword and baton within a laurel wreath, surmounted by a crown in gold embroidery) and cap visor (two rows of gold oakleaf embroidery) as other generals.

As in the United Kingdom, the rank was later replaced by colonel commandant in 1922 and brigadier in 1928. However, those holding the rank of brigadier general continued to do so throughout the inter-war period, until the last of them retired or was promoted during the Second World War. A brigadier general was a general officer, but brigadiers were not generals, which is shown by the rank insignia being like that of a colonel, but with an extra (third) star/pip, and a brigadier wore the same gorget patches (scarlet cloth with a line of crimson gimp), cap badge (the Royal Crest in gold embroidery), and cap visor (one row of gold oakleaf embroidery) as a colonel.

=== Bangladesh ===
Prior to 2001, the Bangladesh Army rank was known as brigadier, in conformity with the rank structure of the Commonwealth Nations. In 2001, the Bangladesh Army rechristened the rank to brigadier general. It is the lowest flag officer order and classify as a "one-star rank". Brigadier general is equivalent to commodore of the Bangladesh Navy and air commodore of the Bangladesh Air Force.

=== Belgium ===
The Belgian Army uses the rank of général de brigade (French) and brigadegeneraal (Dutch, 'brigade general'). However, in this small military there are no permanent promotions to this rank, and it is only awarded as a temporary promotion to a full colonel who assumes a post requiring the rank, notably in an international context (e.g. as military attaché in a major embassy).

=== Brazil ===
General de brigada (Brigade general) is the lowest rank amongst general officers of the Brazilian Army; i.e. like in most British Commonwealth countries, the lowest general officer rank is a two-star rank, and a general de brigada wears two-star insignia. Hence, it is equivalent to the major general rank of many countries. In the Brazilian Air Force, all the senior ranks include 'brigadeiro'; the two-star rank is brigadeiro (brigadier), the three-star rank is major-brigadeiro (major-brigadier), and the four-star rank is tenente-brigadeiro-do-ar (lieutenant brigadier of the air).

=== Canada ===
Rank insignia

Army shoulder

Air force shoulder

Air force cuff

In the Canadian Forces, the rank of brigadier-general (BGen) (brigadier-général or brigadière-générale in French) is a rank for members who wear army or air force uniform, equal to a commodore for those in navy uniform. A brigadier-general is the lowest rank of general officer. A brigadier-general is senior to a colonel or naval captain, and junior to a major-general or rear-admiral.

The rank title brigadier-general is still used notwithstanding that brigades in the army are now commanded by colonels. Until the late 1990s brigades were commanded by brigadier-generals. In the air force context, brigadier-generals used to command air force groups until these bodies were abolished in the late 1990s.

The rank insignia for a brigadier-general on air force uniforms is a single wide braid on the cuff, as well as a single silver maple leaf beneath crossed sabre and baton, all surmounted by St. Edward's Crown, worn on the shoulder straps of the service dress jacket, and on slip-ons on other uniforms. The rank insignia on army uniforms is a gold maple leaf beneath crossed sword and baton, all surmounted by St. Edward's Crown, on the shoulder straps. On the visor of the service cap are two rows of gold oak leaves; the air force wedge cap features silver braid on the edges of the ear flaps. The cap insignia for a general officer is a modified version of the Canadian Forces insignia. Army brigadier-generals wear gorget patches on the collar of the service dress jacket or the service dress short-sleeved shirt.

Brigadier-generals are initially addressed verbally as "General" and name; thereafter by subordinates as "Sir" or "Ma'am" in English or "mon général" or "ma générale" in French. They are normally entitled to staff cars.

Until unification in 1968 of the Royal Canadian Air Force, Canadian Army, and the Royal Canadian Navy, rank structure and insignia followed the British pattern. This system of rank insignia was reinstated in 2013, but general officers reverted to the 1968 system in 2016. In army usage, the term "brigadier" was used to denote what is now known as a brigadier-general while the air force used the rank of air commodore.

=== Chile ===
Portrait of José María Vergara Lozano (1792–1857), depicted in the uniform of a brigadier general of the Republic of Gran Colombia during the era of Simón Bolívar.

In the Chilean Army, Brigadier is a one-star rank and General de Brigada is the immediately superior two-star rank. While the Chilean Air Force uses Comodoro for its one-star rank, two-star Air Force officers hold the rank of General de Brigada Aérea – literally 'air brigade general'.

=== Colombia ===
The rank of brigadier general was established in 1953 by decree 1325 on the 21st of May. With this decree, the ranks of lieutenant general and general were replaced by brigadier general and lieutenant general establishing brigadier as the first grade for generals. In the 60s these ranks were reformed once again creating a third rank, brigadier general, Major general, and general in the Fuerzas Militares, and the National Police.

=== France ===
France uses the rank of "brigade general" (général de brigade). The rank contrasts with the French sub-officer rank of brigadier. As with all French general officers, a French brigade general is titled "general" without any implication that he is an army general; for instance General Charles de Gaulle never rose higher than brigade general.

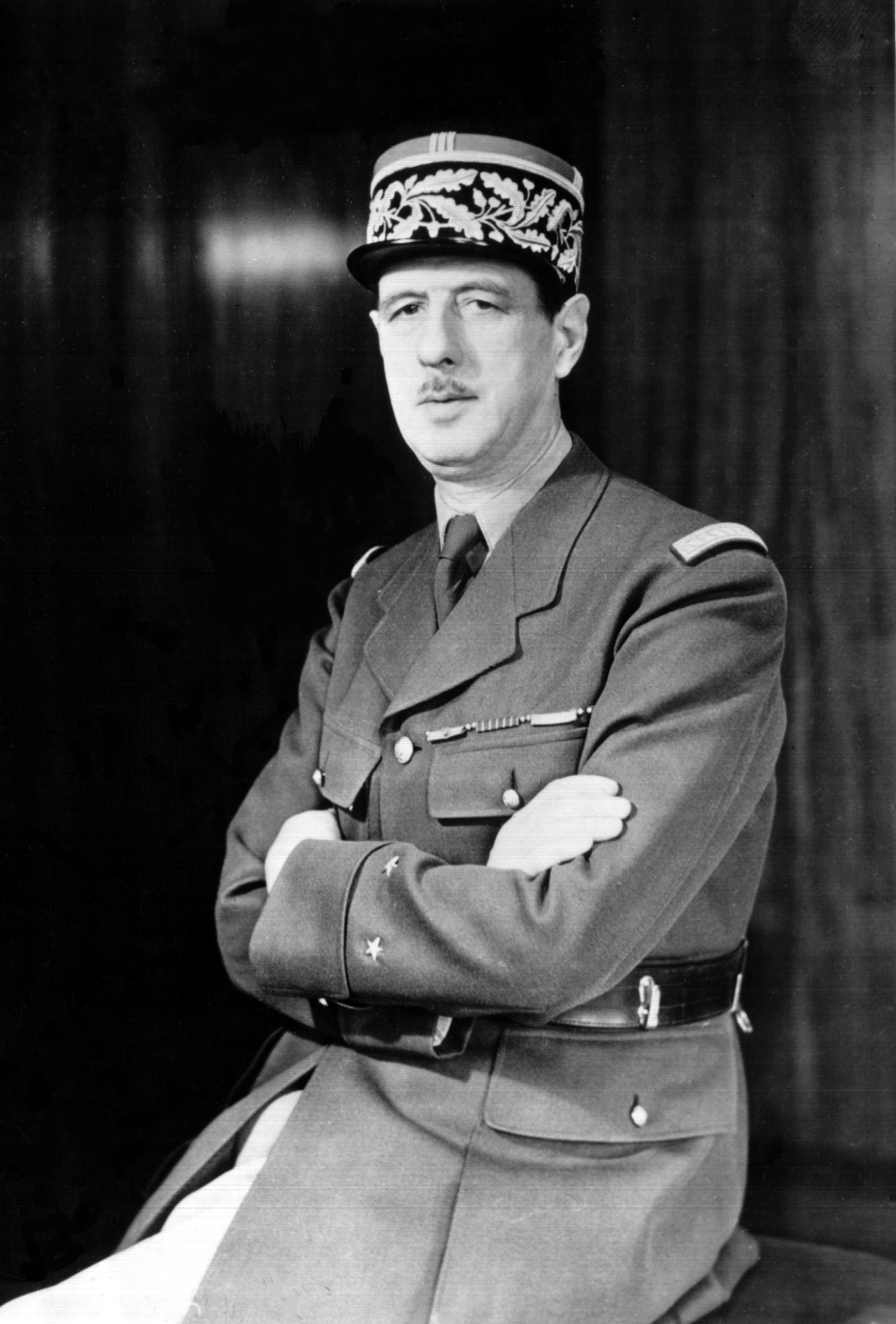
Charles de Gaulle during World War II in his uniform of Général de Brigade

Until 1793, the rank of brigadier des armées ("brigadier of the armies") existed in the French Army, which could be described as a senior colonel or junior brigade commander. The normal brigade command rank was maréchal de camp (literally "camp marshal"). When rank insignia were introduced, brigadier des armées wore one star and a maréchal de camp wore two stars. During the French Revolution, the revolutionaries' drive to rationalise the state led to a change in the system of ranks. The rank of brigadier des armées was abolished and the normal brigade command rank, maréchal de camp, was replaced by brigade general. The rank of brigade general inherited the two stars of the rank of maréchal de camp, explaining the absence since 1793 of a French rank with only one star. For this reason, in France, the rank corresponding to brigade general was changed to brigadier general after NATO was established on April 4, 1949, and before that, it corresponded to major general.

Nowadays, a French général de brigade generally commands a brigade. The rank can also be awarded in an honorary fashion to retiring colonels. The insignia are two stars, worn on the shoulder or at the sleeve of the uniform, depending on the order of dress. Two different kepis are issued: the service kepi sports the two stars, while the formal kepi features a large band of oak leaves (the kepi of a division general has two smaller such bands).

Charles de Gaulle held the rank of brigade general. He was given a temporary promotion to this rank in May 1940 as commander of the 4th Armoured Division (4^{e} division cuirassée). However his initial authority as head of the Free French really came from being the only cabinet member (Under-Secretary of State for National Defence and War) outside occupied France, not from his military rank. As a reminder of his war position, he refused any further promotion.

=== Ireland ===
The country is divided into two areas for administrative and operational reasons, and in each area there is an infantry brigade. The two brigade group structure envisages distinct operational areas of responsibility for each of the brigades and is supported in its responsibilities by the Naval Service and Air Corps. Each of the brigade formations and the Air Corps is commanded by a brigadier general, while the Naval Service is commanded by a commodore.

=== Italy ===
In the Italian Armed Forces the rank has different denominations. In the Army, the rank for combat arms officers is generale di brigata whilst for the logistics and technical corps is called brigadier generale. In 1926, the brigadiere generale and maggior generale in comando di brigata were merged and renamed with their current rank designation.The rank is also present in the other armed forces, police corps and other services of Italy, with different denominations, and it is associated with the lowest level within the government top management.

=== Mexico ===
Within the Mexican Armed Forces, there exists two grades of brigadier general. The lowest general officer is General brigadier, with the second lowest being General de brigada. The general officer rank higher than the two brigadier generals is Divisional general.

=== Philippines ===
In the Philippines, Brigadier General (Philippine Army Philippine Air Force and Philippine Marines)/ Commodore (Philippine Navy and Philippine Coast Guard)/ Chief Superintendent (Bureau of Fire Protection and Bureau of Jail Management and Penology) / Police Brigadier General (Chief Superintendent before) (Philippine National Police) / Gial De Brigada (1890–1902) (Philippine Revolutionary Army) is the lowest rank of generals but already eligible in the promotion to become Chief of Staff of the Armed Forces of the Philippines or PNP Chief of the Philippine National Police surpassing the Major General and Lieutenant General ranks.

=== Poland ===
Brigadier General (Polish: Generał brygady, abbreviated gen. bryg.) is the lowest-ranking general in the Polish Land Forces and Air Force.

=== Portugal ===
In the Portuguese Army and Air Force, brigadeiro-general is a temporary general rank for the colonels that have to exercise a special command. It is the equivalent of the commodore rank in the Portuguese Navy.

The rank was reintroduced in 1999. Before that, simply as brigadeiro, it existed from 1707 to 1864 and again from 1929 to 1947, not being considered a general rank. From 1947 to 1999, brigadeiro become the two-star general rank in the Portuguese Army. As two-star rank, it was substituted by the rank of major-general in 1999.

=== Spain ===
In the Spanish Army, Spanish Air Force, and Spanish Marine Infantry (Infantería de Marina, a branch of the Armada) general de brigada is the lowest rank of general officers. Its equivalent in the Navy (Armada) is contraalmirante.

=== Turkey ===
In the Turkish Army and the Turkish Air Force, the equivalent rank is tuğgeneral (the Turkish Navy equivalent is tuğamiral). The name is derived from tugay, the Turkish word for a brigade. Both tugay and tuğ- as military terms may owe their origins to the older Turkish word tuğ, meaning horsetail, which was used as a symbol of authority and rank in Ottoman and pre-Ottoman times.

=== United Kingdom ===
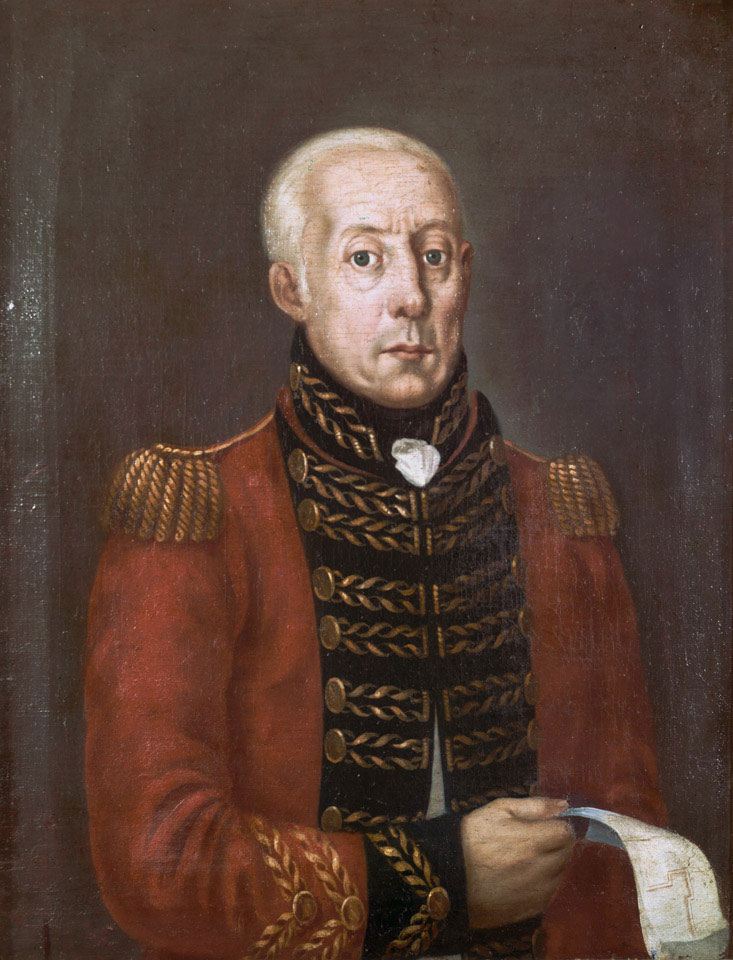
c. 1809 portrait of Hugh Lyle Carmichael in the uniform of a British brigadier general

Brigadier-general was formerly a rank or appointment in the British Army and Royal Marines, and briefly in the Royal Air Force. The appointment was abolished in the Army and the Marines in 1921; the equivalent rank today is Brigadier.

=== United States ===
In the United States Army, United States Air Force, United States Marine Corps, and United States Space Force, a brigadier general is a one-star general officer. It is equivalent to the rank of rear admiral (lower half) in the other uniformed services.

=== Uruguay ===
In the Uruguayan Air Force, a brigadier general is the second highest rank in its hierarchy, behind the air general, and the first of the general officers to be achieved. It is equivalent to the rank of general in the Army and counter admiral in the Navy. Each brigadier general is appointed by the Executive with the approval of the Senate, in accordance with Article 168 of the Constitution of the Republic.

== Insignia ==
=== Army insignia ===
General de brigada
(Argentine Army)

Brigadier general
(Bengali: ব্রিগেডিয়ার জেনারেল, romanized: Brigēḍiẏāra jēnārēla)
(Bangladesh Army)

Brigadier general
(Barbados Regiment)

Brigadier general
(Belize Defence Force)

Général de brigade
(Benin Army)

General de brigada
(Bolivian Army)

Brigadni general
(Bosnian Ground Forces)

General de brigada
(Brazilian Army)

Brigedier jeneral
(Royal Brunei Land Force)

Général de brigade
(Burkina Faso Ground Forces)

Général de brigade
(Kirundi: Jenerai wa birigade)
(Burundi Army)

Général de brigade
(Cameroon Ground Forces)

Brigadier-general
(French: Général de brigade)
(Canadian Army)

Général de brigade
(Central African Ground Forces)

General de brigada
(Chilean Army)

Brigadier general
(Colombian National Army)

Général de brigade
(Land Forces of the DR Congo)

Général de brigade
(Congolese Ground Forces)

General de brigada
(Cuban Revolutionary Army)

Général de brigade
(Djiboutian Army)

General de brigada
(Dominican Army)

General de brigada
(Ecuadorian Army)

General de brigada
(Army of Equatorial Guinea)

ብርጋዴር ጄኔራል
Birigadēri jēnērali
(Ethiopian Ground Forces)

Général de brigade
(French Army)

Général de brigade
(Gabonese Army)

Brigadier general
(Gambian National Army)

General de brigada
(Guatemalan Army)

Général de brigade
(Guinea Ground Forces)

Brigadeir-general
(Army of Guinea-Bissau)

General de brigada
(Honduran Army)

Brigadir jenderal
(Indonesian Army)

Général de brigade
(Ivory Coast Ground Forces)

Gjeneralbrigade
(Kosovo Security Force)

Brigadier general
(Liberian Ground Forces)

Général de brigade
(Madagascar Ground Forces)

Brigedier jeneral
(Malaysian Army)

Général de brigade
(Mali Army)

General brigadier
(Mexican Army)

General de brigada
(Mexican Army)

Бригадын генерал
Brigadyn gyenyeral
(Mongolian Ground Force)

Général de brigade
Arabic: Liwa'
(Royal Moroccan Army)

Brigadier general
(Nepali: सहायक रथी, romanized: Sahaayak rathee)
(Nepalese Army)

General de brigada
(Nicaraguan Army)

Général de brigade
(Niger Army)

Brigadier general
(Nigerian Army)

General de brigada
(Paraguayan Army)

General de brigada
(Peruvian Army)

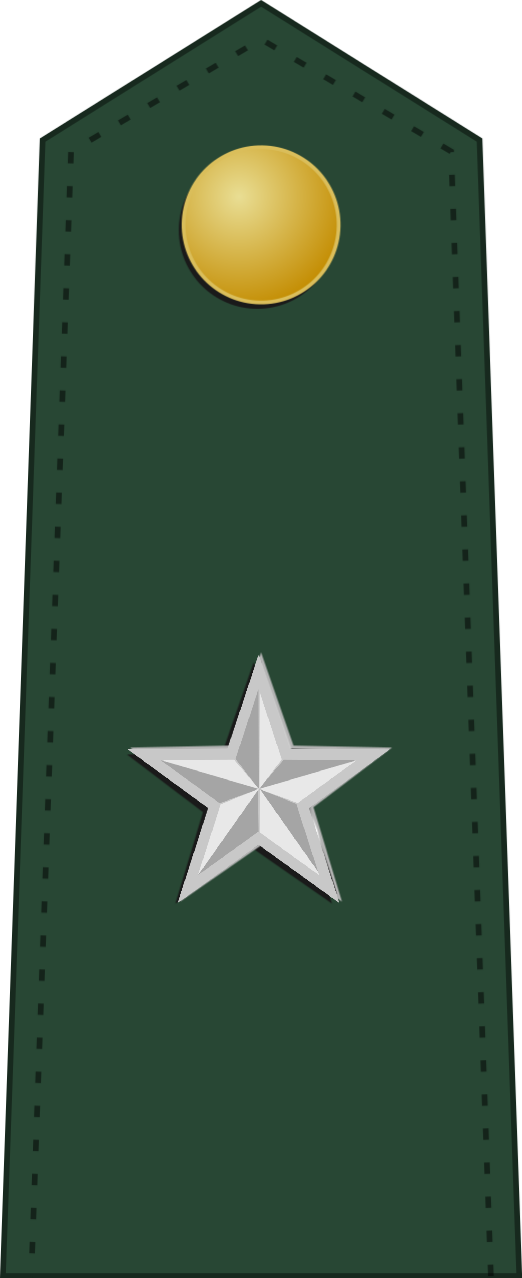
Brigadier general
(Philippine Army)

Generał brygady
(Polish Land Forces)

Brigadier general
(Rwandan Land Forces)

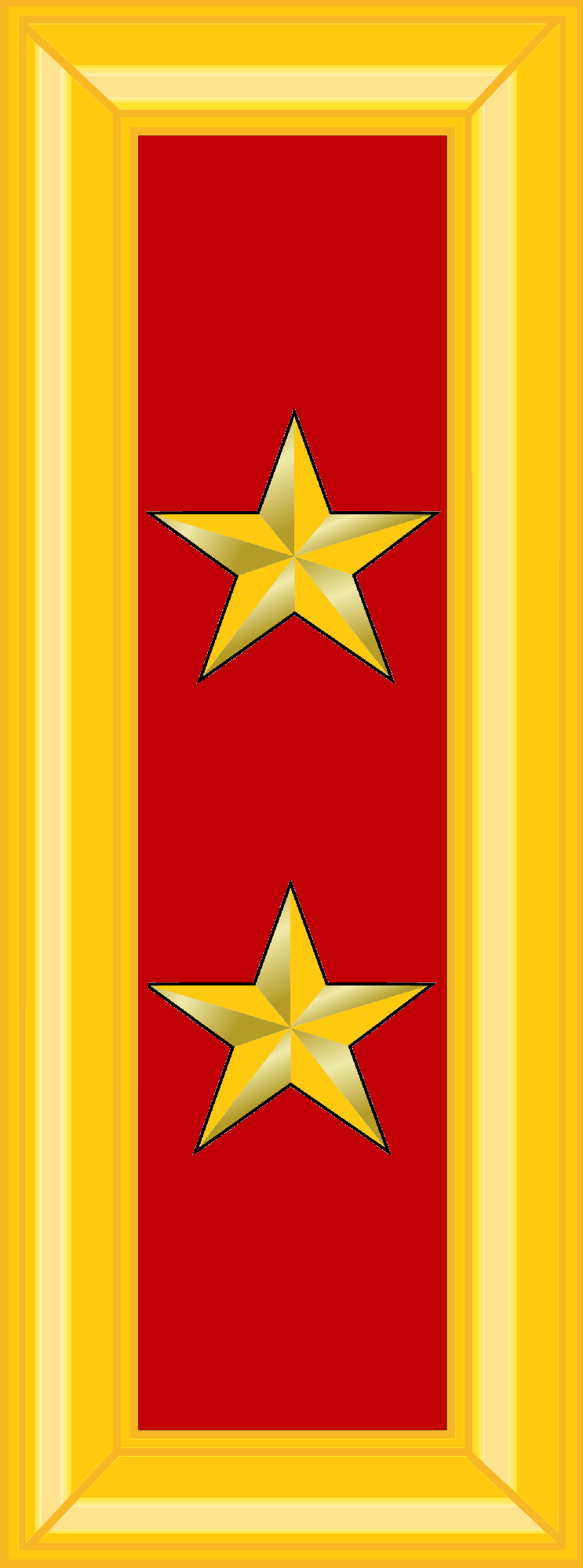
General de brigada
(Salvadoran Army)

Général de brigade
(Senegalese Army)

Brigadier general
(Singapore Army)

Brigadier general
(South African Army)

Brigedia jenerali
(Tanzanian Army)

Brigadeiro-general
(Timor-Leste Army)

Général de brigade
(Togolese Army)

Brigadier general
(Trinidad and Tobago Regiment)

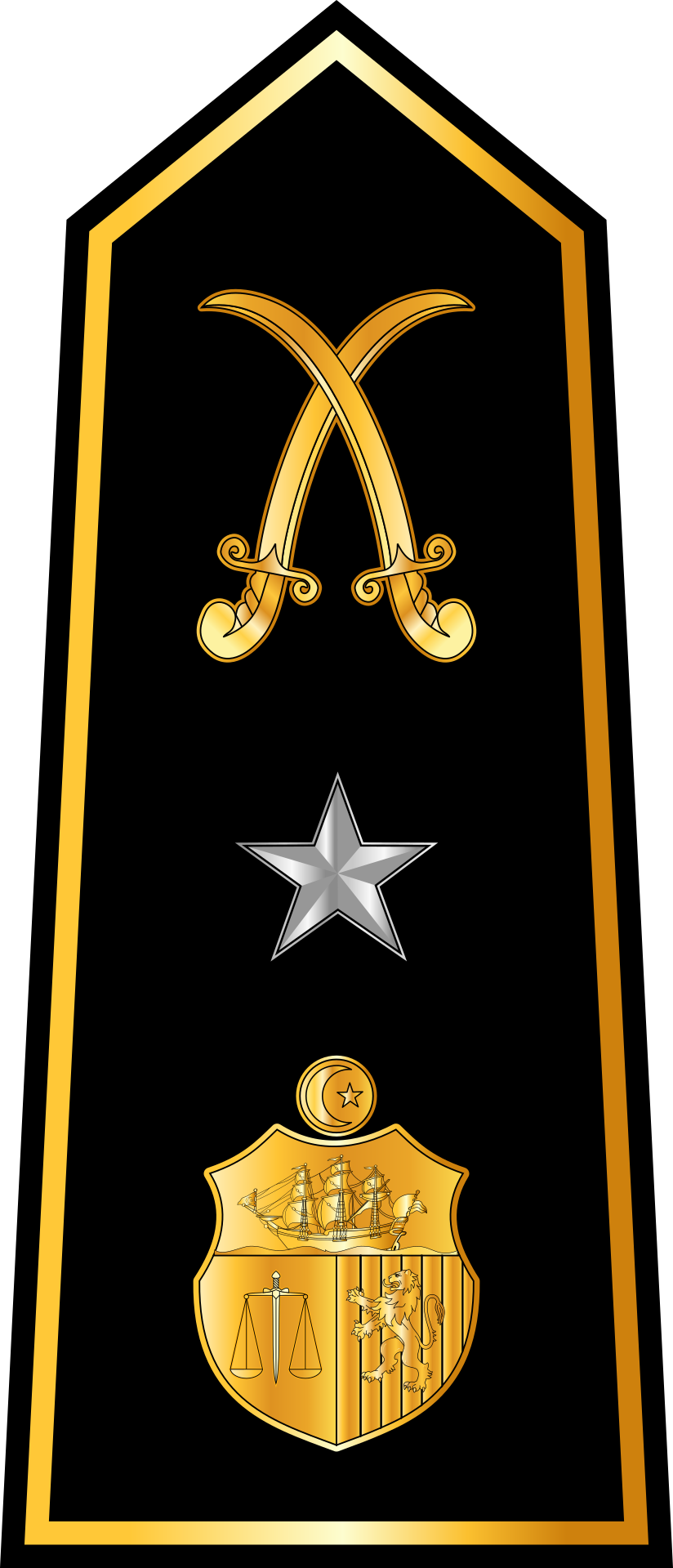
Général de brigade
(Arabic: أمير لواء, romanized: 'amir liwa')
(Tunisian Army)

Brigadier general
(Ugandan Land Forces)

Brigadier general
(United States Army)

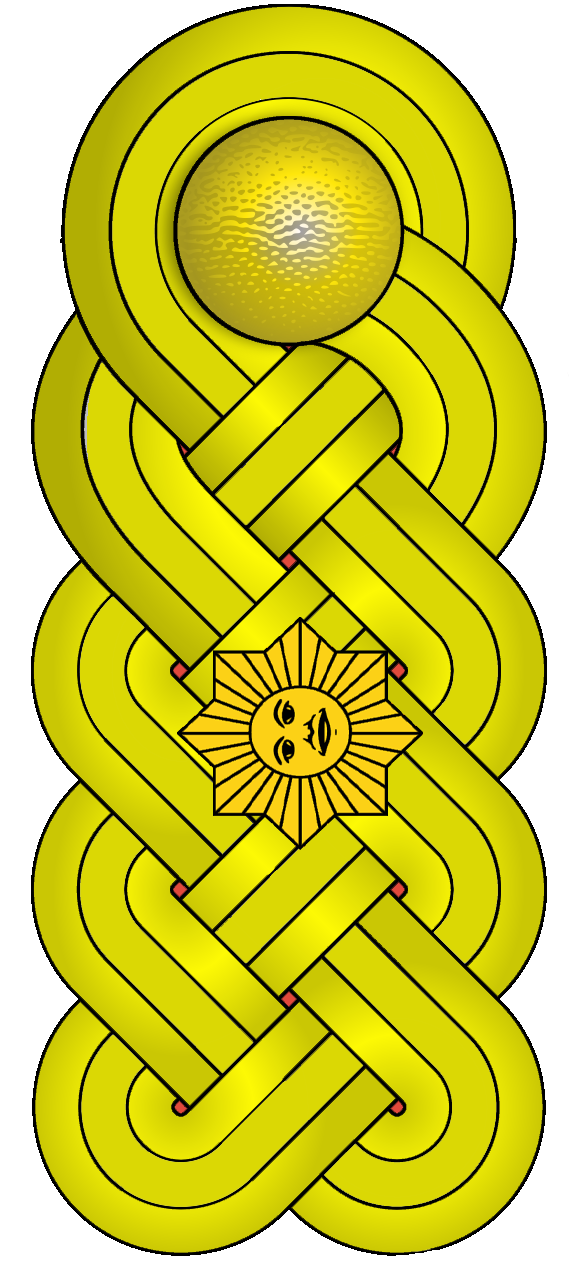
General de brigada
(Venezuelan Army)

Brigadier general
(Zambian Army)

== See also ==
- Brigadier
- British Army officer rank insignia
- Comparative military ranks
- History of Russian military ranks
- Military unit
- NATO Air Force officers
- NATO Army officers
- U.S. Army officer rank insignia
- United Kingdom and United States military ranks compared
