= Lozano de Peralta family =

Colombian aristocratic family

Lozano de Peralta Family
- Noble family & Aristocracy
- Country: Colombia
- Current region: Cundinamarca Colombia
- Founded: Alcalá de HenaresSpain
- Founder: Jorge Miguel Lozano First Marquis
- Final ruler: Jorge Tadeo Lozano
- Titles: Marquisate of San Jorge of Bogotá, Viscount of Pastrana
- Connected families: Álvarez family Gonzalez family Pastrana family Caicedo family Ricaurte family Vergara family
- Distinctions: Marquisate of San Jorge of Bogotá, Majorat of Dehesa of Bogotá
- Properties: House of the Marquis of San Jorge Archaeological Museum, Bogota, Colombia.
- Dissolution: 1824

The Lozano de Peralta family was one of the most aristocratic families of Colombia during the colonial age, well known for being the richest family of the new kingdom of Granada. ln 1771, they acquired the title of Marquises, the only noble title of Colombia. The marquisate of Saint George of Bogotá was a noble title given to Jorge Miguel Lozano de Peralta by the King Carlos III.

== History ==
The family was the richest and most powerful family of the New Kingdom of Granada. Considered one of the oldest families of colonial Colombia. The founder of the lineage was Jorge Miguel Lozano y Peralta (Circa 1650) born in Alcalá de Henares, Spain. Served as mayor of Santafé and Oidor. His son José Antonio Lozano de Peralta y Varáez, born in Sevilla. Illustrious Latinist and theologian of the society of Jesus and lawyer of the Royal court of Santafé. Later, his grandson, Jorge Miguel Lozano de Peralta, born in Santafé de Bogotá, inherited the valuable majorat of the Dehesa de Bogotá, established by his grandfather, and the extremely rich lands of El Novillero, in the Bogotá savannah, which made it in the owner of the greatest fortune in the kingdom. From the age of twenty-five, which he turned in 1756, he was appointed royal lieutenant and as such held at different times the mayor of the city, a position that his grandfather also held. In 1772, by order of the King of Spain, the majorat of the Dehesa de Santafé became a marquisate and its owner became the Marquis of San Jorge and Viscount of Pastrana.

== Marquisate of San Jorge of Bogotá ==
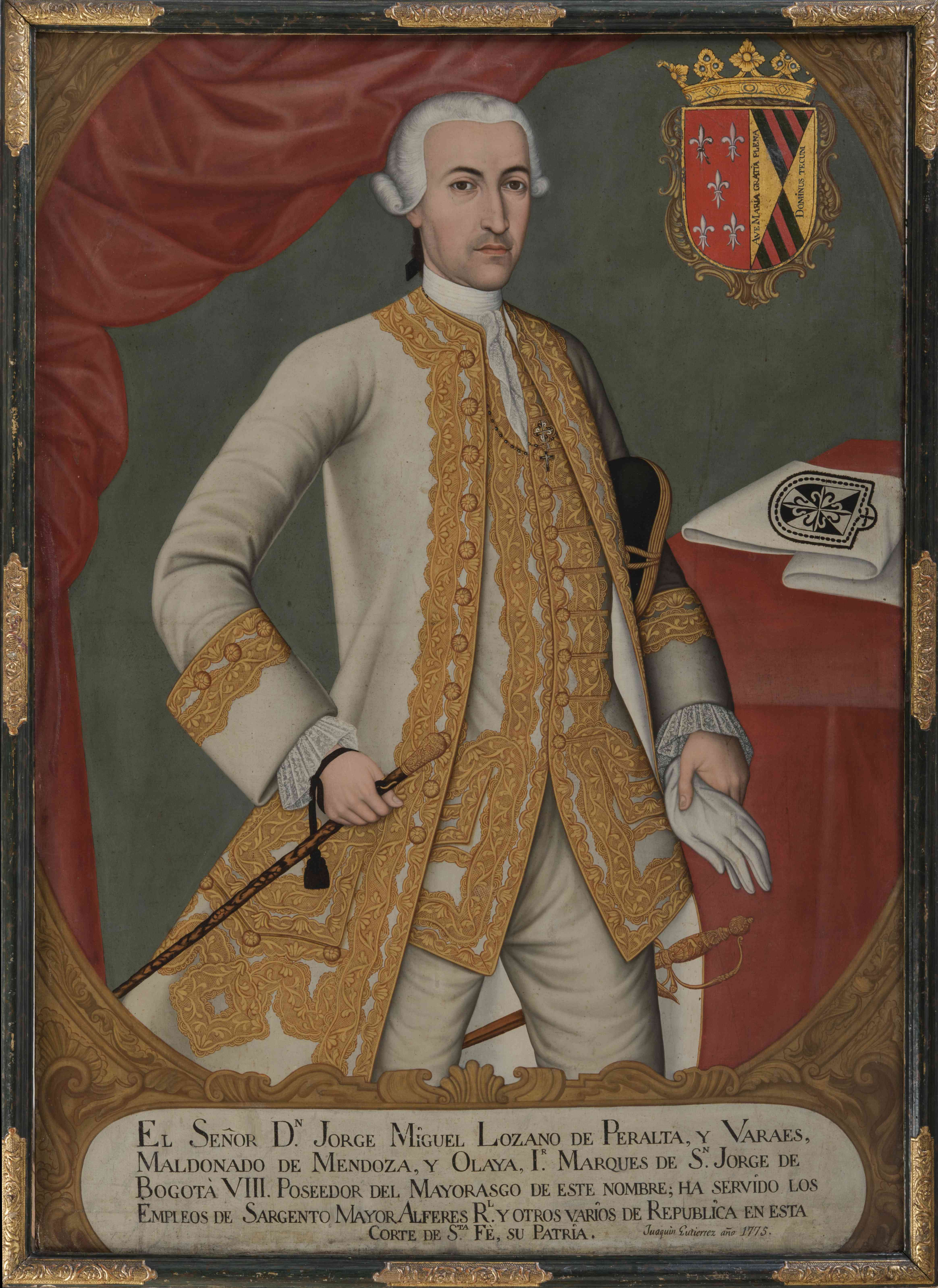
Jorge Miguel Lozano de Peralta, 1st Marquise of Saint George of Bogotá

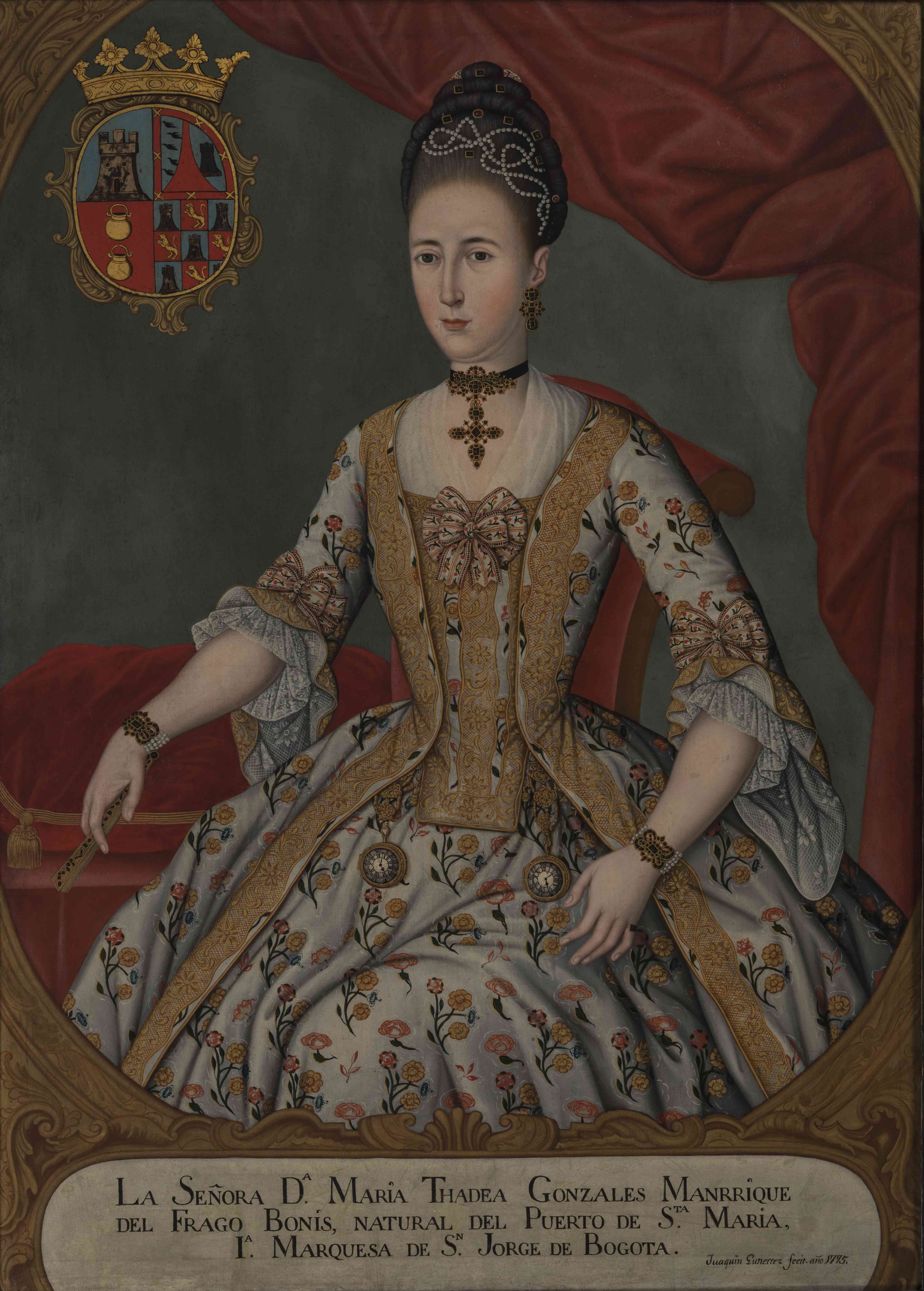
Maria Thadea Gonzales Manrique del Frago Bonis, 1st Marchioness of Saint George of Bogotá

In 1767, Jorge sent to the Council of the Indies in Spain a Relation of Merits and Circumstances, with the purpose of obtaining a noble title. Years later, in 1771, King Charles III of Spain authorized Viceroy Pedro Messia de la Cerda to grant two titles of Castile to whom the Viceroy deemed met the requirements of nobility, rank and fortune to hold them. One of those chosen was Jorge Miguel Lozano and his wife María González Manrique, who received the title of first Marquise & marchioness of San Jorge of Bogotá by King Charles III of Spain and the Royal Audience.

By 1775, the family possessions in the Santafé de Bogotá savannah covered around twenty thousand hectares, and in the city they owned nine houses and a tannery. The Lozanos also traded products from the New World and Castile, and officiated as a moneylender. The first Maquis of Saint George or San Jorge, had an outstanding political career in the viceregal administration: he was a councilor of the Santafé council, ordinary mayor of Santafé, mayor of the Santa Hermandad, deputy for supplies of Santafé. He also held the position of Royal Ensign, responsible for carrying the royal banner at public events.

== Notable Members ==
- 1st Marquis of San Jorge of Bogotá Jorge Miguel Lozano de Peralta
- 2nd Marquis of San Jorge of Bogotá José María Lozano de Peralta
- 3rd Marquis of San Jorge of Bogotá, Independence Hero and Mayor Jorge Tadeo Lozano; the eldest son of the 1st Maquis. After marrying the daughter of his brother José María the 2nd Marquis he received the title of Marquis and the courtesy title of Viscount of Pastrana.
- 1st Marchioness of San Jorge of Bogotá Maria Thadea Gonzales Manrique
- General, ambassador, José Maria Vergara y Lozano
- Captain, Martyr, Independence Hero, Antonio Ricaurte Lozano
- Designated President of Colombia, Carlos Lozano y Lozano

== Additional texts ==
- Jose Maria Vergara y Lozano:
- Archeological Museum House of the Marquis of San Jorge:

== Secondary references ==
- Phelan, J. L. (2010). The People and the King: The Comunero Revolution in Colombia, 1781. Ukraine: University of Wisconsin Press. Pg. 70
- McFarlane, A. (2002). Colombia Before Independence: Economy, Society, and Politics Under Bourbon Rule. United Kingdom: Cambridge University Press. Pg. 280, 310
- Gutiérrez R., G. R. (1998). The mayorazgo of Bogotá and the marquesado of San Jorge: wealth, lineage, power and honor in Santa Fé: 1538-1824. Argentina: Colombian Institute of Hispanic Culture.
- The Colombia Reader: History, Culture, Politics. (2016). United Kingdom: Duke University Press.
