= Jorge Miguel Lozano, Marquis of San Jorge =

Don Jorge Miguel Lozano de Peralta Marquis of San Jorge
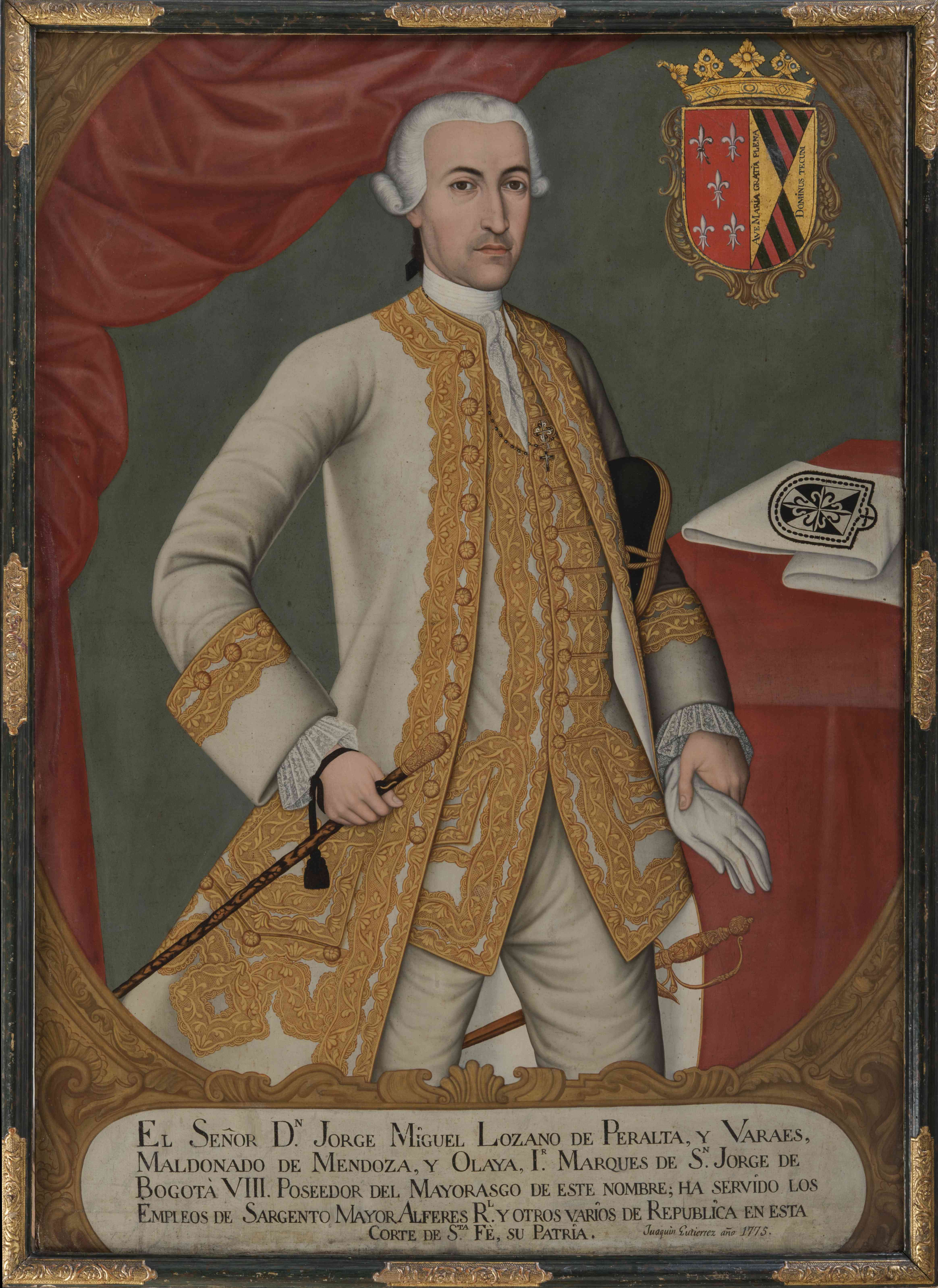
- Portrait of Jorge Miguel Lozano, by Joaquín Gutiérrez (Bogotá Museum of Colonial Art).
- Education: Del Rosario University
- Title: Marquis of San Jorge of Bogotá
- Successor: José María Lozano de Peralta

Jorge Miguel Lozano de Peralta y Varaes Maldonado de Mendoza y Olaya (Santafé, December 13, 1731-Cartagena de Indias, New Kingdom of Granada August 11, 1793), was a Colombian aristocrat, First Marquis of San Jorge de Bogotá, and eighth owner of the "mayorazgo" of the same name, a businessman and politician. descendant of Spanish and Creole elite. Served as mayor of Bogotá and is well known for being the richest man of Colombia during the 18th century.

== Biography ==
He was born on December 13, 1731, in Santafé. From a well-established bureaucratic colonial family from Spanish origins, he inherited a large fortune, which he increased considerably through very successful business and real estate activities. By 1775, his possessions in the Santafé de Bogotá savanna covered around twenty thousand hectares, and in the city he owned nine houses and a tannery. He also traded in products from the New World and Castile, and acted as a moneylender. He had an outstanding political career in the viceregal administration: he was councilor of the Santafé council, ordinary mayor of Santafé, mayor of the Santa Hermandad, deputy of supplies of Santafé. He also held the position of Royal Ensign, responsible for carrying the royal standard at public events.

In 1767 he sent a List of Merits and Circumstances to the Council of the Indies in Spain, with the purpose of obtaining a noble title. Years later, in 1771, King Carlos III authorized Viceroy Pedro Messia de la Cerda to grant two titles of Castile to those who the Viceroy deemed met the requirements of nobility, rank and fortune to hold them. One of those chosen was Jorge Miguel Lozano, who received the title of Marquis of San Jorge de Bogotá.

The newly elected Marquis was required to pay taxes to confirm his appointment, a requirement to which he opposed, since he considered that the title was a recognition by the monarch of his merits and services, and should not be conditioned on the payment of any compensation. The Marquis' position led the Royal Court to deprive him of the title and, given Lozano's decision to disobey the Court and continue using it, a fine was imposed on him. In response, the Marquis sent the king two letters in which he not only protested the mistreatment to which he was being subjected, but also stated that the disorder and misery of the viceroyalty was due to the incompetence and corruption of the viceregal administration.

Probably due to the tension caused by a recent uprising in the northeast of the viceroyalty in 1781 – the Comuneros insurrection – the Marquis' gesture was poorly received at court, and from Spain came the order to imprison Lozano de Peralta, who at the beginning of 1787 had to leave Santafé under arrest. Although since 1790 he enjoyed freedom in Cartagena de Indias, he died on August 11, 1793, in said city, waiting for his situation to be resolved and thus be able to return to the capital of the viceroyalty.

He had several of his children, including José María Lozano, second Marquis of San Jorge and inhabitant of the house that today bears the name of said noble title.

Among his relatives are famous personalities of the time such as: Jorge Tadeo Lozano (son), Antonio Ricaurte (grandson), Manuel de Bernardo Álvarez del Casal (son-in-law), José María Vergara y Lozano (grandson), Eustaquio Galavís y Hurtado.

== Bibliography ==
- Gutiérrez Ramos, Jairo (1993) 'The Marquis of San Jorge de Bogotá'. The House of the Marquis of San Jorge, Santafé de Bogotá. Collection of art and objects. Bogotá: Culture Promotion Fund.
