= Manuel Benito de Castro =

Neogranadine politician

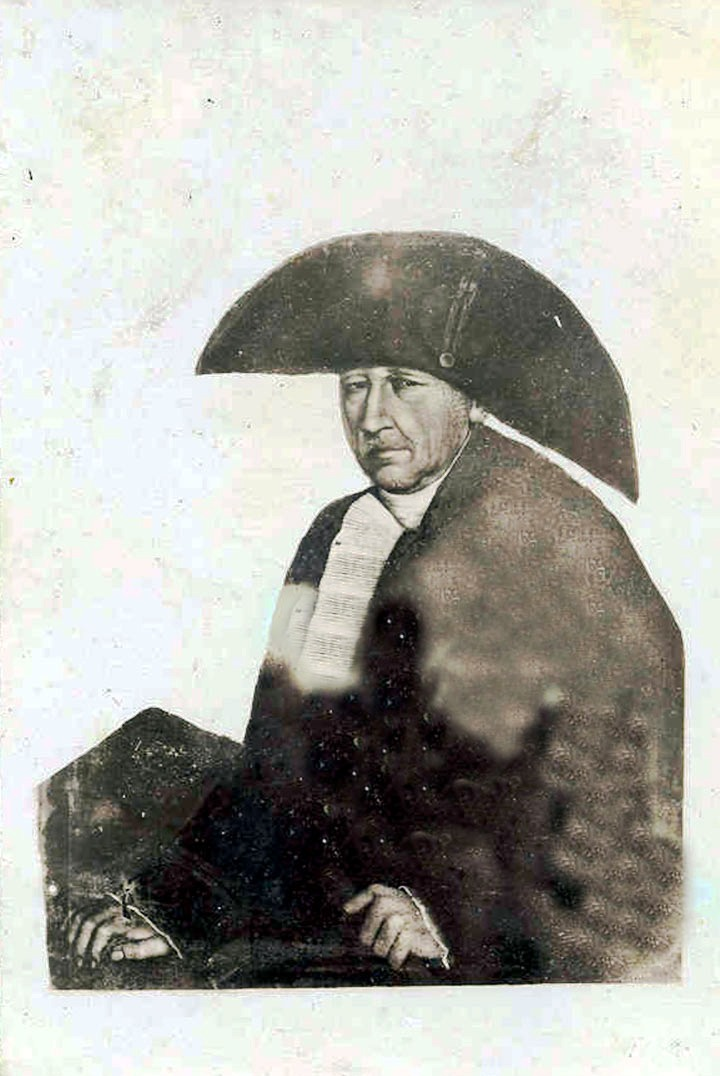

Governor President of the State of Cundinamarca and Viceregent of the King's Person
- In office August 19, 1812* – September 12, 1812 Co-leading with Luis de Ayala y Vergara
- Monarch: Ferdinand VII
- Preceded by: Antonio Nariño
- Succeeded by: Antonio Nariño

Personal details
- Born: January 21, 1751 Bogotá, Cundinamarca
- Died: March 5, 1826 (aged 75) Bogotá, Cundinamarca
- Party: Centralist
- Exercised power since June 25.

Manuel Benito de Castro (January 21, 1751 – March 5, 1826) was a Neogranadine politician. He became President of the State of Cundinamarca in 1812 in place of Antonio Nariño.

== Early life ==
Castro was born on January 21, 1751, in Santafé de Bogotá, the capital of the Viceroyalty of the New Granada. His father, also named Manuel Benito de Castro, was a rich man who had inherited his fortune when the Viceroy José Solís Folch de Cardona, became a monk, his mother was Teresa Díaz de Arcaya, also a rich woman, daughter of the Captain of the Cavalry of the Viceroyalty Guard.

Castro was a Jesuit novice when he was young, for this he was known a "Father Manuel".

== Presidency ==
Castro was a pateador, a centralist, who believed that the government should be a centralized one, with the capital in Santafé de Bogotá, he was a supporter of Antonio Nariño, also a pateador, who included him in his cabinet. On June 25, 1812, Castro was left in charge of the Presidency of the State of Cundinamarca by Nariño, who went to Tunja to fight the Royalist forces in the South. He was officially elected President of the State on August 19, and served until September 12 when Nariño returned and assumed power again.

After the Spanish Reconquista of the New Granada, Pablo Morillo expelled Castro from Santafé de Bogotá and sent him to Tunja, leaving all his fortune behind. Castro eventually returned to Bogotá after the defeat of the Royalists, and died at the age of 75 in Bogotá on March 5, 1826.

== Controversy and criticism ==
Castro was an eccentric man, who was described as wearing a cape, a ceremonial sword, a cocked hat, and other such articles of clothing that had long gone out of fashion.

When he assumed the presidency, one of his conditions was that he could leave the sessions of Congress at a certain time to go and feed his dog; on another occasion, it is said that when he was called to appear to go to the Counsel, he replied that he would go after he finished grooming his dog. His time in power was complicated by the confrontation between centralists and federalists, and Nariño was forced to come back and take back the presidency.

Pablo Morillo did not know what to do with him, he was too eccentric, and during his time in power was criticized for being too inept, he posed no danger to the Reconquista, and Morillo finally decided to expel him from Bogotá, and sent him to Tunja, with the excuse of having weapons in his house, the weapon being a ceremonial sword he always carried,

After his death, the newspaper La Miscelánea, printed a very critical obituary of him for being single his whole life, because, as he said "...It is too much to risk uniting with a woman, whose character may be assumed, but never understood...".

== See also ==
- José Solís Folch de Cardona
- Manuel de Bernardo Álvarez del Casal
