= Magdalena Ortega de Nariño =

Wife of Antonio Nariño (1726-1811)

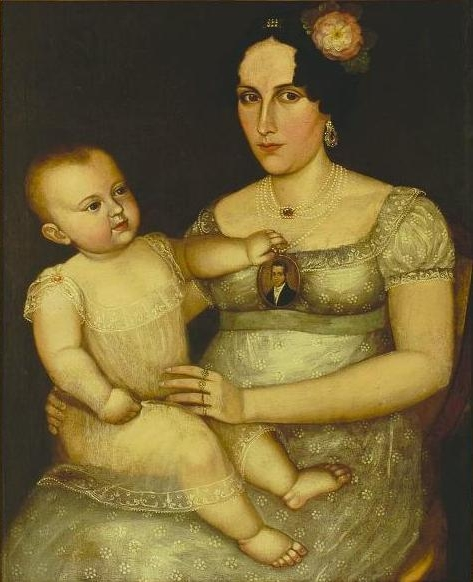
- c., 1807
- Born: Magdalena Ortega Mesa; July 22, 1762; Bogotá, Viceroyalty of New Granada
- Died: June 16, 1811 (aged 48); Bogotá, United Provinces of New Granada
- Known for: Spouse of the Governor of Santa Fe de Bogotá (1789–1790)
- Spouse: Antonio Nariño (m. 1785)
- Children: 6

Magdalena Ortega de Nariño (July 22, 1762 – June 16, 1811) was the wife of the politician and father of the founder Antonio Nariño.

== Early life, marriage and family ==
Magdalena Ortega Mesa was born on July 22, 1762, in Bogotá to José Ignacio Ortega and Petrona Mesa Moreno. She began attending school in 1770 at her parents' urging. She married Antonio Nariño in March 1785.

After her marriage to Nariño, Magdalena served as a social hostess at the Nariño residence in Bogotá, where prominent thinkers of the time gathered, including Francisco Antonio Zea, José Joaquín Camacho, and José María Lozano de Peralta.
