= José Maria Vergara y Lozano =

Colombian general and diplomat

Deputy for Casanare Province to the Congress of Angostura
- In office 1819–1819

Ambassador of Gran Colombia in the United Kingdom
- Incumbent
- Assumed office 1822 Serving with Fernando Peñalver

Personal details
- Born: José María de Vergara Azcárate y Lozano de Peralta; 8 December 1792 Santafé de Bogotá, Viceroyalty of New Granada, Spanish Empire
- Died: 19 June 1857 (aged 64) Bogotá, Republic of New Granada
- Relations: Jorge Tadeo Lozano (maternal uncle)
- Parent(s): Juan de Vergara y Caicedo; Manuela Lozano de Peralta
- Awards: Order of the Liberator; Medal of the Liberators of Cundinamarca; Bust of the Liberator
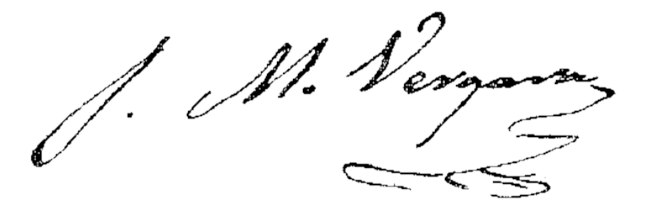
- Signature

Military service
- Allegiance: Kingdom of Spain 1792-1812; United Provinces of New Granada 1812–1816 Venezuela 1816-1818; United Provinces of New Granada 1818-1819; Gran Colombia 1819-1857
- Branch/service: Spanish Army; New Granadan republican army Army of Venezuela; Army of Gran Colombia
- Years of service: c. 1808–1822
- Rank: Brigadier general
- Commands: Cundinamarca Battalion; 1st Battalion, Army of the South
- Battles/wars: Napoleonic Wars; Peninsular War; Battle of Bailén; Siege of Cádiz; Battle of Barrosa; Spanish American wars of independence; Colombian War of Independence; Cúcuta campaign; Battle of Cúcuta; Nariño's Southern Campaign; Battle of Alto Palacé; Battle of Calibío; Battle of Juanambú; Battle of Cebollas; Battle of Tacines; Battle of the Ejidos of Pasto; Spanish reconquest of New Granada; Battle of Cachirí; Venezuelan War of Independence; Admirable Campaign; Apure campaign; Battle of Los Cocos; Battle of El Yagual; Battle of Achaguas; Campaign of the Centre; Battle of Semén; Battle of Ortiz; Battle of Rincón de los Toros; Battle of Cojedes

José Maria Vergara y Lozano de Peralta (1792–1857) was a Colombian major general and hero of Independence of New Granada and Gran Colombia, Deputy for Casanare in the Congress of Angostura and diplomat of Colombia in London representing the South American country in the Congress of Troppau.

During the South American colonies' struggle for independence against the Spanish crown, Vergara emerged as a prominent general. He fought in numerous battles alongside colombia´s founding fathers such as Simon Bolivar and Francisco de Paula Santander. Vergara's contributions to the Independence were invaluable, and he is widely considered as one of the major figures of the independence movement. Afterward, he served as an ambassador for Gran Colombia.

== Biography ==
At a tender age, José María set sail with his father to Spain. Unfortunately, during the voyage, his father fell ill and died, leaving José María to complete the journey alone. He eventually arrived at the port of Cádiz, where he was warmly received by some family friends. The city of Cádiz became his new home and the place where he embarked on his academic journey. José María excelled in his studies and was eventually granted a prestigious position as an officer in the Spanish military.

During the tumultuous years of the Spanish war against Napoleon, José María played a significant role in the fight against the French. He fought bravely in the years 1808 and 1809, serving under the leadership of the Spanish General Teodoro Reding, who was of Swiss origin. After the Battle of Bailén, José María was promoted to the rank of lieutenant of the guards, a well-deserved recognition of his courage.

Upon learning of the independence movements in America, he made the decision to return to New Granada. An American provided assistance, and consequently, he spent a period of time in the United States before arriving at the port of Cartagena de Indias. Upon his arrival, he was appointed Lieutenant Colonel in 1812 and subsequently joined Simón Bolívar's expedition in Mompox. During the Cúcuta campaign, he played a pivotal role in the battles against Correa. Notably, he led an advance of 25 men against a force of 300, ultimately achieving victory.

In 1813, Antonio Nariño, a leader in the independence movement of Colombia, ordered José María Vergara to lead the Cundinamarca battalion in the southern campaigns. Vergara fought alongside his troops in several battles, including Palacé, Calibio, Juanambú, Cebollas, Tasines, and Pasto. These battles were crucial in securing the independence of Colombia from Spanish rule.

In 1816, Vergara marched towards Ocaña, a Spanish-controlled territory during their reconquest of New Granada. Despite the Spanish forces being in the midst of a reconquest, Vergara joined General Custodio García Roviza in battles at Cachirí, Los Cocos, Yagual, Achaguas, Rincón de los Toros, Semen, Ortiz, and Cojedes. These battles were fierce and challenging, but Vergara and his troops were able to persevere and make significant contributions to the independence of Colombia.

The same year, Vergara fought in Casanare and the Apure campaigns alongside General Manuel Roergas Serviez. These campaigns were also essential in securing the independence of Colombia. Later, on August 19, Vergara arrived in Guayana and was distinguished by the Liberator Simón Bolívar, who promoted him to brigadier general. This was a significant achievement for Vergara, and it recognized his bravery and contributions to the independence of Colombia. After his promotion, Vergara served as the chief of staff for the army commanded by José Antonio Anzoátegui. He continued to demonstrate his leadership abilities and helped to lead the army to further victories against the Spanish.

During his time in Angostura, he held two significant positions: Chief of Staff of the Rifle Battalion and Chief of the Honor Guard. His dedication and service led to him being invited to attend the Congress of Angostura, where he delivered a speech that was later recorded for posterity:

"The union of New Granada and Venezuela cannot and should not be like that of a conquered country, or ceded as a dowry to be in the interest of two families, or on the other hand, of another for the same or different political view. It must be done through the express will of the inhabitants of both countries, convinced of the mutual usefulness that must be for them."

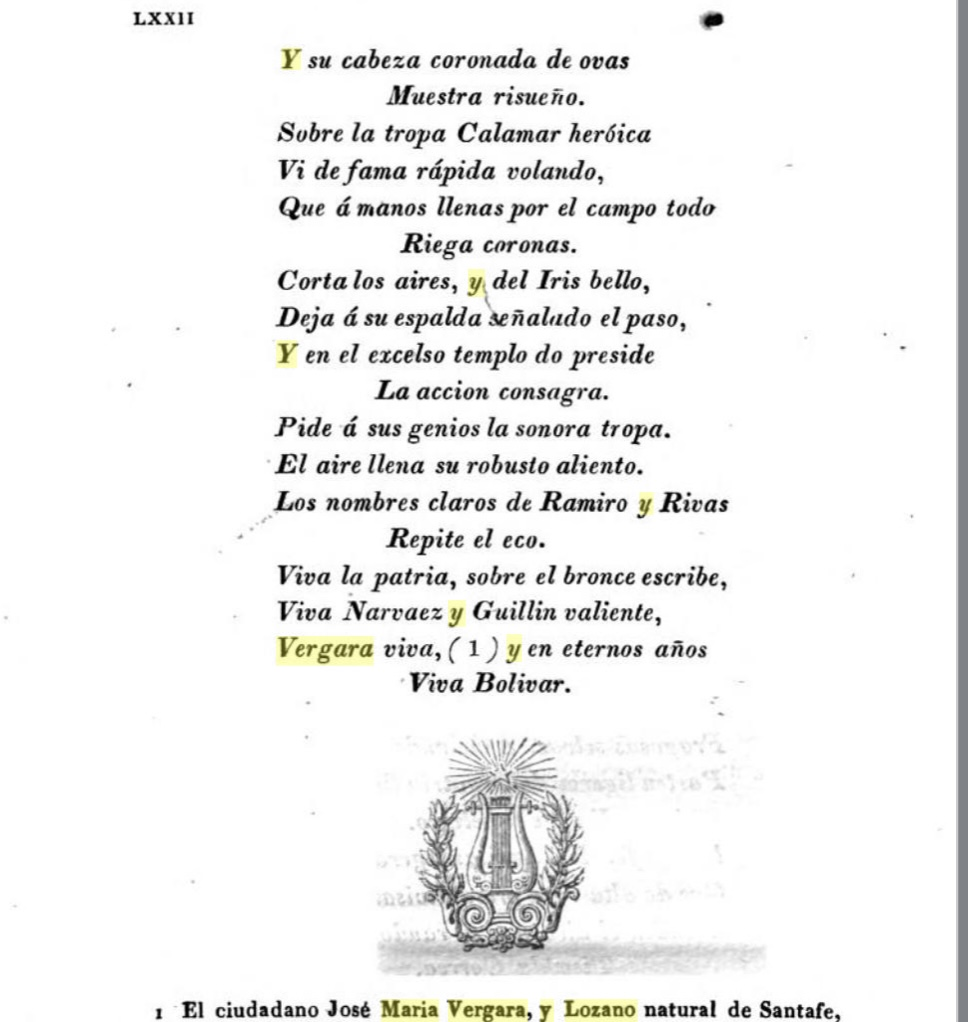
musical composition of war, printing of the state for Simon Bolivar by the president of cundinamarca Antonio Nariño, 1813.

In 1820, he started experiencing symptoms of mental illness that prevented him from continuing his work. As a result, he returned to New Granada in 1822 where he was taken care of by his cousin's son, Ignacio Gutierrez Vergara, later president of Colombia. Unfortunately, he never recovered from his illness and spent the rest of his life in the Casablanca manor estate of the Vergara family, which was near Bogotá. He died in 1857. His funeral was attended by several notable figures, including the president of the republic at that time, Mariano Ospina Rodriguez, the archbishop of Bogotá, and generals such as Tomas Cipriano Mosquera, Rafael Urdaneta, Joaquín Paris, Mendoza, Buitrago, Briceño, and Piñerez.

== Family ==
He hailed from a family line that had a long history of nobility and aristocracy in Santafé. His father, Juan de Vergara Azcárate y Caycedo, was the son of Francisco de Vergara Azcárate, who was the Regent of the Court of Accounts and was a descendant of the House of Azcárate and the House of Sandoval. His mother, Manuela Lozano de Peralta and González Manrique, was the daughter of the Marquises of San Jorge of Bogotá, Jorge Miguel Lozano and Tadea González Manrique.

In addition, he had several uncles who were also Marquises, including José María Lozano de Peralta, Jorge Tadeo Lozano, Tadea Lozano, and Isasi. He was a descendant of Antonio de Vergara Azcárate, who was the colonial treasurer of Santafé during the Spanish colonial period.

Moreover, he was related to several Colombian presidents, including Felipe de Vergara, Estanislao Vergara, Joaquín Mosquera, and Tomás Cipriano de Mosquera. He was also an uncle to Luis de Ayala y Vergara and Ignacio Gutiérrez Vergara, further cementing his family's prominence in Colombian history.
