= Nariño, Antioquia =

Nariño
- Municipality and town
- Parroquia Nuestra Señora de las Mercedes as viewed from a chiva bus

- Flag Coat of arms

- Location of the municipality and town of Nariño in the Antioquia Department of Colombia
- Coordinates: 5°36′33″N 75°10′35″W
- Country: Colombia
- Department: Antioquia Department
- Subregion: Eastern

Area
  - Total: 313 km^{2} (121 sq mi)

Population (Census 2018)
  - Total: 8,603
  - Density: 27.5/km^{2} (71.2/sq mi)
- Time zone: UTC-5 (Colombia Standard Time)

Nariño is a town and municipality in the Colombian department of Antioquia. The population was 8,603 at the 2018 census. It is part of the subregion of Eastern Antioquia.

== Climate ==
Nariño has a cool tropical rainforest climate (Af) due to altitude with heavy to very heavy rainfall year-round.

Climate data for Nariño
Month	Jan	Feb	Mar	Apr	May	Jun	Jul	Aug	Sep	Oct	Nov	Dec	Year
Mean daily maximum °C (°F)	23.2 (73.8)	23.7 (74.7)	23.9 (75.0)	23.0 (73.4)	23.2 (73.8)	23.4 (74.1)	23.9 (75.0)	23.7 (74.7)	23.4 (74.1)	22.6 (72.7)	22.3 (72.1)	22.6 (72.7)	23.2 (73.8)
Daily mean °C (°F)	18.6 (65.5)	19.0 (66.2)	19.3 (66.7)	18.9 (66.0)	19.2 (66.6)	19.0 (66.2)	19.1 (66.4)	19.0 (66.2)	18.7 (65.7)	18.4 (65.1)	18.2 (64.8)	18.4 (65.1)	18.8 (65.9)
Mean daily minimum °C (°F)	14.1 (57.4)	14.4 (57.9)	14.8 (58.6)	14.8 (58.6)	15.2 (59.4)	14.7 (58.5)	14.3 (57.7)	14.3 (57.7)	14.1 (57.4)	14.2 (57.6)	14.2 (57.6)	14.2 (57.6)	14.4 (58.0)
Average rainfall mm (inches)	201 (7.9)	241 (9.5)	304 (12.0)	433 (17.0)	453 (17.8)	258 (10.2)	189 (7.4)	246 (9.7)	355 (14.0)	468 (18.4)	335 (13.2)	282 (11.1)	3,765 (148.2)
Source: Climate-Data.org
