= Nariño, Cundinamarca =

Nariño
- Municipality and town
- Flag Coat of arms

- Location of the municipality and town inside Cundinamarca Department of Colombia

- Location in Colombia
- Coordinates: 4°23′53″N 74°49′41″W
- Country: Colombia
- Department: Cundinamarca
- Elevation: 263 m (863 ft)
- Time zone: UTC-5 (Colombia Standard Time)

Nariño is a municipality and town of Colombia in the department of Cundinamarca.
