= Jorge Tadeo Lozano =

Neogranadine (now Colombian) scientist, journalist and politician (1771–1816)

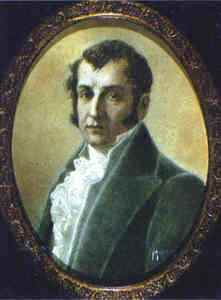
- Miniature by Víctor Moscoso

1st President of Cundinamarca and Vicegerent of the King's Person
- In office April 1, 1811 – September 19, 1811
- Monarch: Ferdinand VII of Spain
- Preceded by: Office created*
- Succeeded by: Antonio Nariño

President of the Constituent Electoral College of Cundinamarca
- In office February 27, 1811 – April 4, 1811
- Vice President: Fernando Caycedo
- Constituency: Soto

Mayor of Bogotá
- In office 1799–1799
- Monarchs: Viceroy Pedro Mendinueta y Múzquiz
- Preceded by: Nicolás Bernal
- Succeeded by: Fernando Zuleta

Personal details
- Born: Jorge Tadeo Lozano de Peralta y González Manrique; January 30, 1771 Santa Fe, Province of Santa Fe, Viceroyalty of New Granada
- Died: July 6, 1816 (aged 45) Santa Fe, Province of Santa Fe, Viceroyalty of New Granada
- Spouse: María Tadea Lozano e Isasi
- Education: Our Lady of the Rosary University
- Occupation: Journalist, politician, professor
- Profession: Zoologist, Botanist, Chemist Soldier (Captain)

Military service
- Allegiance: Spain
- Branch/service: Spanish Army
- Years of service: (1772–1774)
- Rank: Captain
- Unit: Walloon Guards
- Battles/wars: War of the Pyrenees
- See José Miguel Pey de Andrade, leader of the previous ruling Supreme Governing Junta.

Jorge Tadeo Lozano de Peralta, Third Marquis of San Jorge de Bogotá and Viscount of Pastrana (January 30, 1771 – July 6, 1816) was a Neogranadine (now Colombian) scientist, journalist, and politician who presided over the Constituent College of Cundinamarca and was elected President of Cundinamarca in 1811.

== Early life ==
Born Jorge Tadeo Lozano de Peralta y González Manrique, he was the son of the Marqueses of San Jorge, Jorge Miguel Lozano de Peralta Varaés Maldonado de Mendoza y Olaya, and María González Manrique del Frago Bonis. He was born on January 30, 1771, in Santafé de Bogotá, the capital of Viceroyalty of New Granada, present day Colombia.

Lozano was the quintessential Renaissance man, belonging to one of the most prestigious and affluent families of the viceroyalty, and receiving a very extensive and profound education. He studied literature, philosophy, and medicine in the Our Lady of the Rosary University, then called the Colegio Mayor del Rosario. After finishing his studies he opted for a career in the military, and continued his studies in Spain as part of the Walloon Guards, where he fought for Spain against the French in the War of the Pyrenees. Tadeo served under the command of the Spanish General Luis Firmin de Carvajal, Conde de la Union, and rose among the ranks to obtain the rank of Captain in the Royal Spanish Army. While in Madrid he also studied Chemistry and Mathematics in the Royal Laboratory of Chemistry of the Court of Madrid (Real Laboratorio de Química de la Corte de Madrid) between 1792 and 1793. After finishing his studies, and retiring from his military service, Tadeo traveled through Europe and lived for a while in Paris.

When Lozano returned to New Granada in 1797, he became an active member of the tertulias of Bogotá, including the tertulia of the Casino, which was directed by Antonio Nariño, and frequented by other prominent criollos like Francisco Antonio Zea and Manuel de Bernardo Alvarez.

== Journalism ==
In 1801, Lozano and his relative José Luis Azuola y Lozano, founded the newspaper Correo curioso, erudito, económico y mercantil de la ciudad de Santafé de Bogotá, the third newspaper in the viceroyalty and in the history of Colombia. This weekly publication ran between February 17, 1801, and December 29 of the same year, with a total of 46 publications. This publication, along with the subsequent newspapers that were circulated at the time, were crucial in the formation of ideas among the criollos, who began propagating an idea of Neogranadine self-administration, governance, economy and culture separate to that of Europe, thus setting the stage for a future separation. Tadeo had the opportunity to publish some of his own articles in the newspaper, mostly dealing with the idea of forming an economic alliance to foment the economy of the viceroyalty.

Lozano returned to journalism again in 1814, when he founded and directed along with José Ángel Manrique the newspaper El anteojo de larga vista, a short lived publication of only 15 issues, but which were filled with a patriotic and independentist sentiment.

== Political life ==
Lozano's first involvement in politics was 1799, when he was appointed Mayor of Bogotá by the Real Audiencia of Bogotá, he however did not last long in this office. On July 31, 1807, he was appointed Lieutenant Protector of the Indians, for the regions of Bosa, Fusagasugá and Usaquén.

Following the events of the Independence of the New Granada, Lozano offered his services to the cause and became more involved in politics. When José Miguel Pey de Andrade took office of the Open Cabildo of Bogotá he called for a constituent assembly to set the course for the nascent state. Among those chosen as representative for the constituency of Soto, and was elected President of the Constituent Electoral College, having both executive and legislative powers. This legislative body drafted the first constitution of Cundinamarca. This constitution, of a liberal representative character, recognized the King of Spain as the monarch, but dismissed the claims of representation by the Viceroy, making the Colony into a commonwealth state. On April 1, 1811, Tadeo took office as the first President of the newly created confederation called the United Provinces of New Granada.

=== Resignation ===
Although Lozano was elected president, his term did not last long. He was heavily criticised for being too weak, and for the constant scandals he and his family were involved. His biggest opponent was Antonio Nariño, who waved a propaganda campaign to wean him out of office, all orchestrated and divulged by his newspaper La Bagatela, where he openly called for his impeachment or resignation. This campaign was only the product of a popular discontent with Tadeo, who was criticised by many criollos for his connections with Spain and his title of nobility.

Lozano finally resigned on September 19, 1811, letting Nariño assume office. Afterwards he retired from politics and focused himself to his studies and his personal affairs.

== Death and legacy ==
During the Reconquista of the New Granada, the Pacificador Pablo Morillo invaded Bogotá and ushered the Reign of Terror, the purging of the Independentists and their institutions. Morillo sought out Tadeo, for his involvement in Congress, in the revolutionary newspaper El anteojo, and the fact that he was President of Cundinamarca, made him a prime target of the reign of terror. He was persecuted, his possessions taken away, and was finally arrested and held for two months, which culminated in his execution by firing squad on July 6, 1816, in the Orchard of Jaime, now the Plaza de los Mártires in Bogotá.

Lozano is considered a martyr and a hero of the Revolution and Independence of Colombia. His contribution to science, in the areas of Zoology, Botany and expeditions helped cement the basis of science in the education of the country. The Jorge Tadeo Lozano University was founded in his honour.

== Personal life ==
Upon his return to the New Granada, Tadeo fell in love with his niece, María Tadea Lozano e Isasi, daughter of his brother José María Lozano de Peralta, 2nd Marquess of San Jorge. He expressed his desired to marry her, but the Roman Catholic Church could not marry them because of their level of consanguinity; he requested a dispensation from the Archbishop of Bogotá, Baltazar Jaime Martínez Compañón, for which he paid on June 7, 1797, 2 thousand pesos to be used as grants for the education of the girls of the Enseñanza school, six hundred pesos for church decorations, including two religious paintings, and the construction of an aqueduct in Funza. The dispensation was granted on June 28, 1797, and the wedding was subsequently held on July 2 of the same year. Out of this union, 8 children were born:

1. Jorge Miguel
2. Rafael
3. Federico
4. José
5. María Clemencia
6. Juan
7. Francisca
8. Manuela

== Titles and styles ==
Jorge Tadeo Lozano was Viscount of Pastrana, this courtesy title was reserved to the eldest son of the Marquess of San Jorge of Bogotá; the title was originally held by his older brother Jorge Miguel, but ceded it to Jorge Tadeo when he married his daughter María Tadea Lozano e Isasi.

As President of the State of Cundinamarca and Vice-regent of the King's Person, he acted as the pretender Viceroy of the New Granada, however he was not recognized by King Ferdinand VII who had instead appointed Francisco Javier Venegas, Marquess of Reunión and New Spain to the post but was unable to take office. While in office he used the royal styling of Jorge I of Cundinamarca.
