= Nariño, Nariño =

Coordinates: 1.26667°N 77.3667°W

- Municipality and town
- Flag Coat of arms

- Location of the municipality and town of Nariño, Nariño in the Nariño Department of Colombia.
- Country: Colombia
- Department: Nariño Department
- Time zone: UTC-5 (Colombia Standard Time)

Nariño is a town and municipality in the Nariño Department, Colombia.

== Climate ==
Nariño has a subtropical highland climate (Köppen Cfb) with heavy rainfall most of the year and a drier season from June to September.

Climate data for Nariño
Month	Jan	Feb	Mar	Apr	May	Jun	Jul	Aug	Sep	Oct	Nov	Dec	Year
Mean daily maximum °C (°F)	19.5 (67.1)	19.5 (67.1)	19.8 (67.6)	19.9 (67.8)	20.0 (68.0)	19.7 (67.5)	19.4 (66.9)	19.7 (67.5)	19.9 (67.8)	19.9 (67.8)	19.2 (66.6)	19.2 (66.6)	19.6 (67.4)
Daily mean °C (°F)	14.8 (58.6)	14.8 (58.6)	15.1 (59.2)	15.2 (59.4)	15.2 (59.4)	14.9 (58.8)	14.5 (58.1)	14.6 (58.3)	14.7 (58.5)	15.0 (59.0)	14.7 (58.5)	14.7 (58.5)	14.9 (58.7)
Mean daily minimum °C (°F)	10.1 (50.2)	10.2 (50.4)	10.4 (50.7)	10.6 (51.1)	10.5 (50.9)	10.1 (50.2)	9.7 (49.5)	9.5 (49.1)	9.6 (49.3)	10.1 (50.2)	10.2 (50.4)	10.2 (50.4)	10.1 (50.2)
Average rainfall mm (inches)	214.7 (8.45)	182.2 (7.17)	239.2 (9.42)	200.0 (7.87)	167.6 (6.60)	68.6 (2.70)	54.9 (2.16)	35.6 (1.40)	78.1 (3.07)	239.0 (9.41)	319.4 (12.57)	267.4 (10.53)	2,066.7 (81.35)
Average rainy days	15	14	17	15	15	9	7	6	8	17	20	19	162
Source 1:
Source 2:
