= Antonio Nariño =

Colombian politician and independence leader (1765–1823)

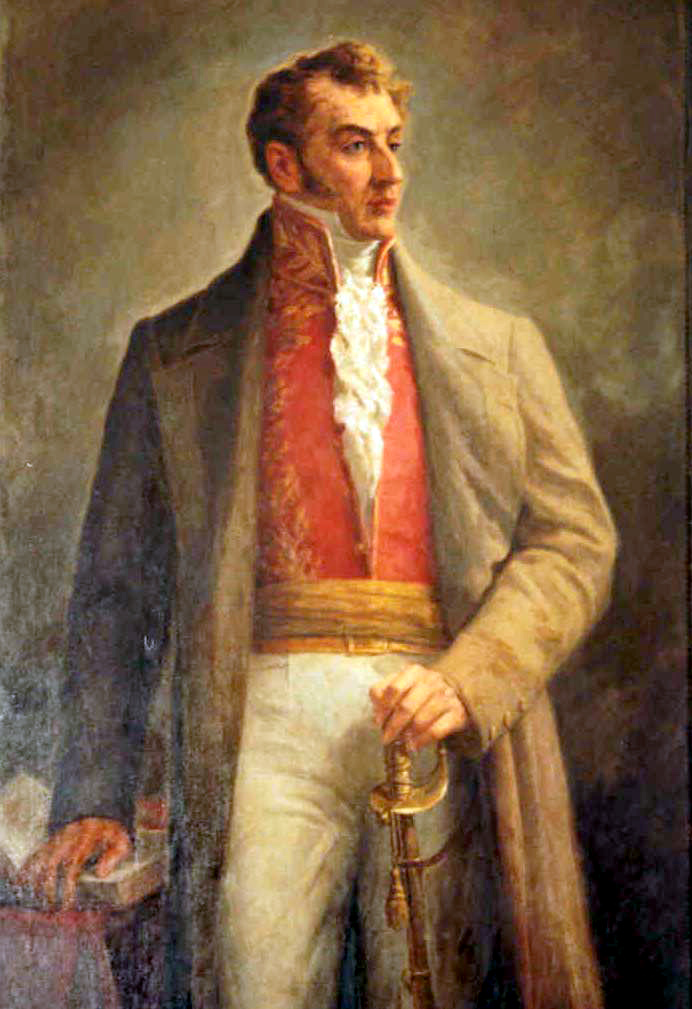
- Oil painting by Ricardo Acevedo Bernal.

3rd Vice President of the Gran Colombia
- In office April 4, 1821 – June 6, 1821
- President: Simón Bolívar
- Preceded by: Juan Germán Roscio
- Succeeded by: José María del Castillo

Governor President of the State of Cundinamarca
- In office September 19, 1813 – May 14, 1814
- Preceded by: Manuel Benito de Castro
- Succeeded by: Manuel de Bernardo Álvarez del Casal

Governor President of the State of Cundinamarca and Viceregent of the King's Person
- In office September 21, 1811 – August 19, 1812
- Monarch: Ferdinand VII
- Preceded by: Jorge Tadeo Lozano
- Succeeded by: Manuel Benito de Castro
- In office September 12, 1812 – September 19, 1813
- Preceded by: Manuel Benito de Castro

Personal details
- Born: Antonio de la Santísima Concepción Nariño y Álvarez; April 9, 1765 Bogotá, Viceroyalty of New Granada
- Died: December 13, 1823 (aged 58) Villa de Leyva, Cundinamarca, Colombia
- Party: Centralist
- Spouse: Magdalena Ortega y Mesa
- Occupation: Politician, military officer, journalist, translator
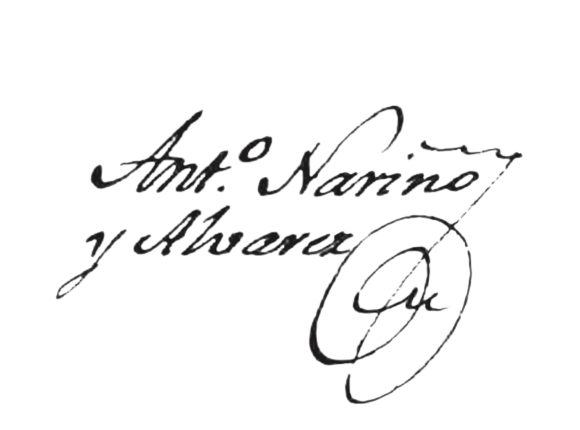
- Signature

Military service
- Allegiance: Cundinamarca
- Branch/service: Army of Cundinamarca
- Years of service: 1811-1814
- Rank: Lieutenant General
- Commands: Army of the South
- Battles/wars: Colombian War of Independence; New Granada Civil War; Battle of Ventaquemada (1812) – Defeat; Battle of San Victorino (1813) – Victory; Nariño's Southern Campaign (1813–1814); Battle of Alto Palacé (1813) – Victory; Battle of Calibío (1814) – Victory; Battle of Juanambú (1814) – Victory; Battle of Cebollas (1814) – Victory; Battle of Tacines (1814) – Victory; Battle of Ejidos de Pasto (1814) – Defeat

Antonio Amador José de Nariño y Álvarez del Casal (April 9, 1765 – December 13, 1823) was a Colombian ideological precursor of the independence movement in New Granada (present-day Colombia) as well as one of its early political and military leaders. In 1793, he published the first French to Spanish translation of the Declaration of the Rights of Man and of the Citizen in Spain's American colonies.

Born to an aristocratic family in 1760 in Santafe de Bogota, from his youth, Nariño was involved in political activities that he knew how to combine with financial and commercial activities that led him to accumulate a fortune. His foray into politics would see him become mayor of the second vote elected by the council of Santafe in 1789, as well as interim treasurer of tithes of the archbishopric, appointed in July of the same year.

His fortune allowed him to import his own printing press, which allowed him to create the Patriotic Press (Imprenta Patriotica) where he began to publish and distribute clandestinely various texts amongst his literary circle of which many prominent creoles of Santafe were a part of. In 1793 after having acquired a French copy of the History of the Revolution of 1789, Narino translated the portion of the text that contained the Declarations of the Rights of Man and of the Citizen from French to Spanish and distributed it among his circle. This event would see his arrest along with other members of his literary society by Spanish authorities.

Between the time of his arrest in his house in Santa Fe, in August 1794 and his release in Cartagena in June 1810, for a period of almost sixteen years, Nariño was imprisoned except for the interval he spent hidden in Europe and America between the moment of his escape to Cádiz (March 17, 1796) and his voluntary surrender in Santa Fe (July 19, 1797).

After his release in Cartagena in June 1810, Nariño returned to Santa Fe in time to collaborate in the organization of the first Neogranadine congress of which he was appointed secretary at the beginning of sessions in December 1810. However, as time passed the unity between the delegates of the various provinces of New Granada would crumble as the argument between Federalism and Centralism arose, Nariño was a staunch centralist and vehemently attacked and criticized his federalist opponents through the press that he owned. This tension would see the federalists split from the centralist congress in Santafe and form a federalist one in Tunja. The two sides engaged in a brief civil war in 1812, where Narino took command of the Centralist military forces and defeated them when they attempted to capture Santafe in early 1813.

Nariño was not originally a military officer by nature, but would take his first steps in that direction in 1813 when he was president of Cundinamarca and he offered to command the united forces of the State that he governed with those of the United Provinces of New Granada, contributed from Tunja by his political rival Camilo Torres Tenorio, in order to march south to recover Popayán and prevent Spanish royalist troops from advancing into the interior of the Republic in an invasion effort ordered by the presidency of Quito.

The initial success of the campaign, which Nariño led victoriously to the gates of the city of Pasto, ended in failure when Nariño was forced to surrender to the military chief of Pasto in May 1814. The following six years were spent again in prison in Spain.

Nariño eventually returned to America in 1820 traveling through the Caribbean and Venezuela. By then his homeland had been liberated from Spanish control and had joined in union with Venezuela to form the Republic of Colombia (Gran Colombia). On February 20, 1821, in recognition of his impact and leadership President Simón Bolívar made him interim vice-president of the new republic. Bolívar also asked Nariño to proceed to install in Villa del Rosario the constitutional congress that would ultimately create the 1821 Constitution and where he ran as a candidate to continue being vice-president of Colombia, however he would ultimately lose the race to General Francisco de Paula Santander.

Defeated politically he was given nominal roles within the government and continued publishing his newspaper "Los Toros de Fucha" (The Bulls from Fucha). Towards the last years of his life he became tired and ill with tuberculosis, he decided to quit his public roles and move to Villa de Leyva. Nariño died there on December 13, 1823. He is considered as one of the founding fathers of modern Republic of Colombia and a hero of the war of independence. Many monuments, towns and provinces carry his name in his honor.

== Early life ==
Antonio Amador José de Nariño y Álvarez del Casal was born on April 9, 1765, in Santafe de Bogota, the capital of the Viceroyalty of New Granada a territorial entity of the Spanish Empire. Born to an aristocratic family, he was the third son of Vicente Nariño y Vásquez, a Spaniard from Galicia, and Catalina Álvarez del Casal a noblewoman from Santafe. His father had moved to New Granada in 1751 as the Official Royal Accountant of New Granada, and headed the first gunpowder factory in Santafé (modern-day Bogotá). He was later promoted to Major Accountant, an important role that he played up to his death in 1778. Nariño's mother was the sister of Manuel Álvarez del Casal, one of the attorneys of the Royal Audience.

Details about his early life are scarce, but apparently, he studied in the Colegio Mayor de San Bartolomé, a well-known Jesuit school in Bogotá, which had been founded in 1604.

In 1781 during the crisis sparked by Revolt of Comuneros of the Socorro Province, Nariño was enlisted as second lieutenant flag bearer in the Urban Infantry Militia Regiment to defend the viceregal government from the uprising, however he did not take place in any of the confrontations of the revolution. With the rebellion crushed, he returned to civilian life as a merchant establishing business contacts in the important ports of Honda and Cartagena as he dealt in the export of tobacco, cacao, and other crops.

Nariño married Magdalena Ortega y Mesa in 1785, with whom he had six children. By then, he was already a merchant and proactively involved in politics. In 1789, he was appointed ordinary major of Santafé, as well as General Treasurer of Tithes. By 1793, he had opened his own print shop and had obtained a license from the government to be allowed to print, which would later bring him trouble.

== Early political activity ==
Nariño was intellectually curious and admired the political ideologies of the leaders of the French and American Revolutions. In his impressive library there was a portrait of Benjamin Franklin above the mantle. In his youth, Nariño was a strong influence among the progressive young people of Bogotá, Colombia, hosting secret political gatherings that he called "The Sanctuary," where the need for independence and the means of achieving it were discussed. Attendees included later notables Pedro Fermín de Vargas, José Antonio Ricaurte, Luis de Rieux, Manuel Torres and Francisco Antonio Zea. Nariño was one of the most outspoken and articulate participants at these meetings and was widely respected by his fellow revolutionaries.

In 1794, Nariño procured a copy of the "Declaration of the Rights of Man", which was being distributed by the French Assembly. He translated the Declaration of the Rights of Man from its original French into Spanish and printed several copies from his own private press. He then circulated these translated pamphlets among his politically like-minded friends. Copies of the pamphlet were distributed to all corners of the continent and created a stirring in the political mentalities of the time. The government soon discovered the material, and any copy that was found was burned. Nariño was arrested on August 29, 1794, as were many of the fellow attendees of his Sanctuary meetings, and underwent trials during the rest of the year and the next one. His attorney, José Antonio Ricaurte, was arrested as well, so no other lawyer wanted to defend his case, and he and his followers were sentenced to ten years of imprisonment in Africa for his leading role in the political group and was exiled from South America. In addition to this, all his property was confiscated. Nariño had previously worked as a tithe collector (Recaudador de diezmos) and was also accused of fraud resulting from this activity.

Nariño managed to escape in Cádiz, however, and then fled to Paris in 1795, where he devoted himself to the study of the French Revolution and its aftermath. This convinced him of the idea that centralized government was a superior form of government. After spending some time in France, Nariño went to England to look for economic and military support from the British but when he was denied it, he decided to return to Santafé (modern-day Bogotá). He traveled in disguise, but eventually he found himself forced to surrender to the authorities, on July 19, 1797. In prison he contracted tuberculosis. He was finally released in 1803, due to his health, and he recovered little by little.

By 1809, however, following the unrest all around the colonies over the Napoleonic invasion of Spain, many people started to meet clandestinely to discuss independence. Some of these conspirators, among them the priest Andrés Rosillo y Meruelo, started discussing a coup to overthrow the government and establish a republic in its stead, and the name of Nariño started circulating. Hearing of said rumors, viceroy Amar y Borbón decided to crush the rebellion before it started, and Nariño found himself arrested yet again when insurrections started to break all over the American colonies. He was moved to the prison in Cartagena de Indias, although he managed to escape briefly, only to be captured again on December 20, 1809, in Santa Marta. Nariño remained imprisoned in Cartagena, and was about to be sent to Puerto Rico, but he was freed in June 1810, following the city's declaration of independence. Following his release from prison, he had to wait for a few months in Cartagena before returning to his family. In December 1810, Nariño returned to Santafé, and became deeply involved in the creation of a sovereign state, independent from Spain.

== The Aftermath of the Declaration of Independence and The Foolish Fatherland ==
Following the formation of Juntas all over the country, profound divisions became evident when trying to determine what type of government should be placed instead of the Spanish crown. In particular, disagreements on whether there should be a single state in the place of the old New Kingdom of Granada or whether the provinces should become autonomous and independent states became a matter of heated debate. The provinces, led by the province of Cartagena, called for a federal solution that gave them equal rights, and were not willing to submit to authorities sent from the capital just like they had submitted to Spanish authorities in the past. In contrast, the province of Cundinamarca, which held the former viceroyal capital, Santafé, was the richest and most populous province, and assumed that it would inherit the authority of the old regime, its leaders fearing the loss of power and privileges that would come with a federalist government. When the Cartagena junta called for a separate General Conference in Medellín, where each province would be represented in proportion to their populations, the Supreme Junta of Santafé decided to counter by inviting each province to send a delegate to form an interim government while a general congress was summoned to establish a Constitutional Assembly for the whole New Granada.

Nariño returned to Santafé just on time to participate in the organization of the Congress of the United Provinces of New Granada, being appointed secretary. The congress was irregular from the start, as it was formed by delegates from barely a handful of provinces (Santa Fe, Socorro, Neiva, Pamplona, Nóvita, and Mariquita), and was deeply divided on whether the cities of Mompós (by then part of the Cartagena province) and Sogamoso, which had sent delegates, should be considered provinces. In the congress, held between December 22, 1810, and February 2, 1811, Nariño was the leader of a push to establish the Congress permanently in Santafé, a proposal that was rejected by the provinces, which saw in this a push for deferral to Santafé, Following profound disagreements, the Congress was dissolved barely more than a month later, when the members stopped attending the sessions.

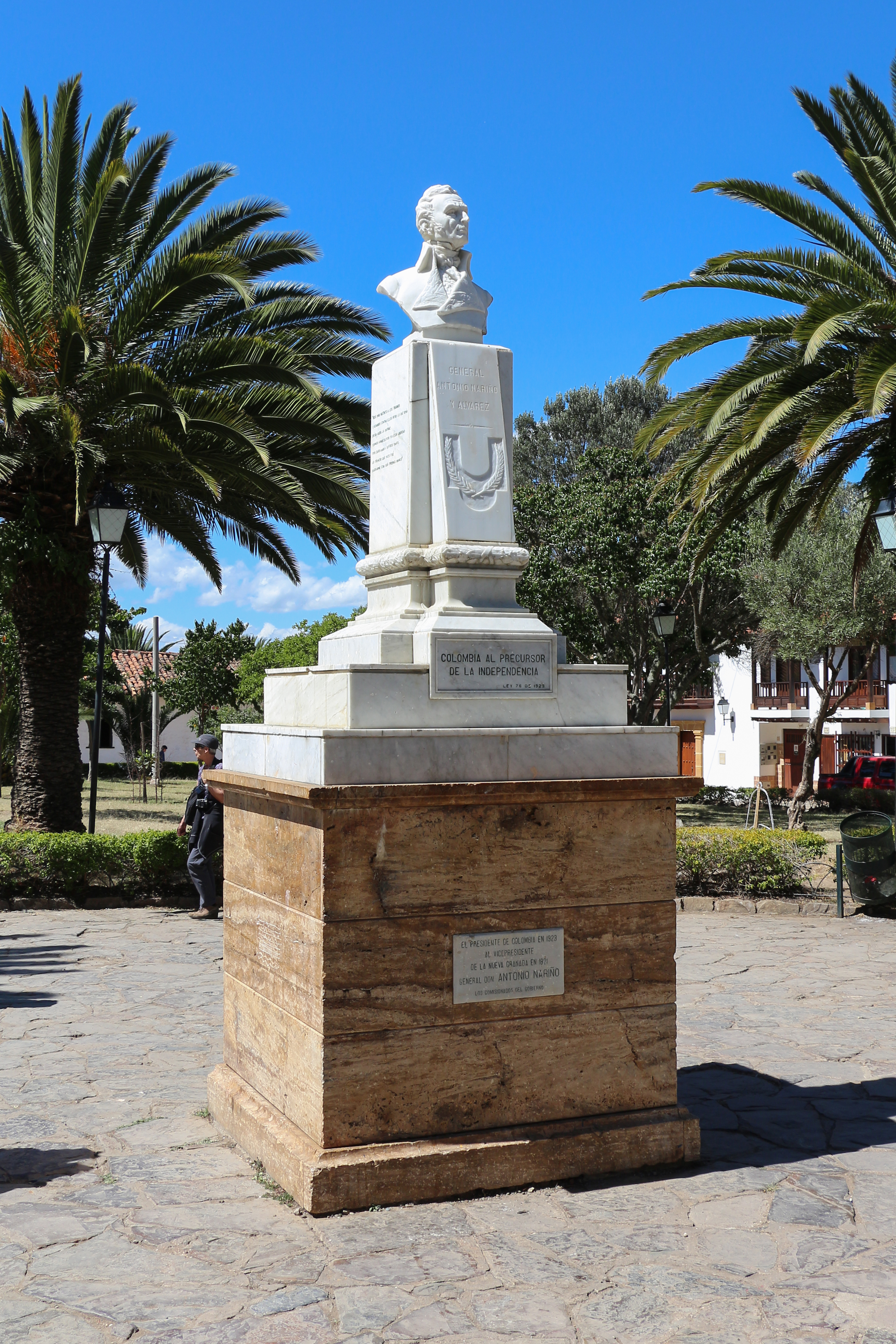
Statue of Antonio Nariño in Villa de Leyva

As provinces were already busy establishing their own autonomous governments, under the lead of Jorge Tadeo Lozano, the Junta Suprema in Santafé called for a constitutional assembly for the province. In March 1811, the province convened a "Constituent Electoral College of the State of Cundinamarca," which promulgated a constitution the following month declaring the creation of the Free and Independent State of Cundinamarca, with Lozano as president. This constitution followed the model of the Constitution of the United States, and established Cundinamarca as a Catholic and constitutional monarchy, under the absent Ferdinand VII (it would only declare full independence from Spain in August 1813).

While the constitution was mostly federalist, centralist ideas were evident in its writing, and it provided for the eventual annexation of other provinces which would then have to obey the provincial constitution. Nariño, who was recently widowed, was appointed as mayor of the city of Santafé on August 30, 1811, and being a fervent centralist, started pushing for a strong centralist position from the newspaper he created, La Bagatela (or The Trifle), which he started publishing on July 14, 1811. In La Bagatela, Nariño became a ruthless critic of Lozano, whom he accused of indecisiveness. The aggressive criticisms by Nariño and his followers led to a riot in the city on September 19, 1811, following which president Lozano and his vice president were forced to resign. Fearful of popular rioting, the legislature elected Nariño as president and conceded to his demands, which increased the influence of the executive power.

The "Congress of the United Provinces," meanwhile, had started meeting again. In spite of Cundinamarca's opposition, the Congress finally achieved an agreement and delivered the Act of Federation of the United Provinces of New Granada on November 27, 1811, a heavily federalist act. The act provided a lot of autonomy to each province, and an extremely weak president who would be subordinate to the congress. This only made the differences between centralist and federalist ideas even stronger. Nariño and his followers became ardent opponents to federalism and to the congress and were convinced that the economic and political power of Cundinamarca would allow the province to dominate and unify New Granada. Nariño convened an assembly to revise the constitution of the state and make it even more centralist and then decided to annex the surrounding provinces of Tunja, Socorro, Pamplona, Mariquita, and Neiva, but was mostly unsuccessful on both enterprises. Nevertheless, the relentless hostility and harassment from Nariño's partisans pushed the members of the Congress to leave Santafé and to escape, first to Leyva and finally to Tunja. This would be the start of the period in the history of the recently founded country that would later be called "the Foolish Fatherland."

Soon, the Cundinamarca province became embroiled in civil war against other provinces, particularly Tunja, where the Congress had settled. Nariño ordered General Antonio Baraya to defeat the federalist leaders in Tunja, but Baraya decided to switch sides and support the federalist forces, and many important leaders like Santander and Caldas joined him. Baraya, and the rebels with him, signed an act that declared Nariño a usurper and a tyrant, and pledged loyalty to the Congress. Nariño used the opportunity to request extraordinary powers from the legislature of Cundinamarca, which allowed him to be appointed as a dictator. On November 26, 1812, Nariño left with his army to conquer Tunja. On December 2, 1812, his army faced a federalist army commanded by Antonio Ricaurte and Atanasio Girardot in the Battle of Ventaquemada, and was soundly defeated, having to retreat back to Santafé. The federalist troops, however, only started pursuing them more than a week later.

Following this defeat, and the subsequent declaration of independence from the province of Socorro, Nariño resigned as soon as he arrived in the city, but not finding a suitable replacement, he was reinstalled as dictator. Nariño then prepared to defend the city, which was put under siege by the Congress' army on December 24, 1812. Nevertheless, on January 9, 1813, in the Battle of San Victorino, Nariño's troops proved superior, and the federalist armies were completely defeated. In June 1813, he was appointed dictator for life, and the following month, the Republic of Cundinamarca finally declared independence from the Spanish Monarchy.

== Southern campaign ==
In July 1813, General Nariño began an intensive military campaign against the Spanish and Royalist forces in the south of the country, intending to reach Pasto and eventually Quito. Nariño's forces, known as the 'Army of the South,' and numbering between 1.500 and 2.000 men, managed to capture Popayán in January 1814 after defeating the Royalist forces in the area in a series of initially successful battles.

After stopping to reorganize the city's government and his own forces, he pressed on towards Pasto. Historians have speculated that, had he not stopped at Popayán but actually decisively pursued the fleeing Royalist army, he might have been able to capture a relatively undefended Pasto.

Antonio Nariño

As things went, however, the constant raids by Royalist guerrillas, the harshness of the terrain, the lack of promised reinforcements from Antioquia, and the delays in bringing up his army's artillery contributed to weakening the morale of many of the troops under Nariño's command, when they had practically reached the gates of Pasto. On May 10, 1814, in the Battle of the Ejidos (Commons) of Pasto, the royalist army led by Melchor Aymerich attacked Nariño's army. After being wounded during combat, a false rumor of his death was spread, and most of the remaining soldiers scattered, only some 400 returning to Popayán. Waiting for reinforcements, Nariño decided to send his officers back to Popayán while he harangued his few remaining troops. Nariño was left practically alone in the battlefield, and attempted to hide in the surrounding mountains, but finally surrendered himself when Royalist scouts found him, hungry and exhausted, on May 14. He had hoped he would be able to negotiate an armistice. He was taken into Pasto in May 1814, and then sent to the Royal prison at Cádiz via Quito on July 15, 1815. From there, he was sent to Lima, where he was taken by ship to Cádiz, arriving on the first weeks of March 1816. Nariño would remain a prisoner in Cádiz for the next four years.

== Later years ==
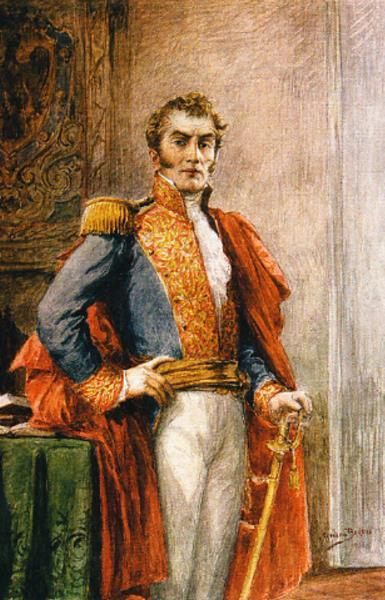
Watercolor by Ricardo Acevedo Bernal

Nariño was freed from imprisonment in 1821, following the revolt of Rafael del Riego, and returned to his home country, Colombia, now independent from Spain after the republican victory at the Battle of Boyacá.

Nariño was one of the candidates for election to the presidency of Gran Colombia in 1821, which he lost to Simón Bolívar by the significant margin of 50 to 6 votes in the Congress held at Cúcuta, finishing second. He also lost the election for vice president, with Francisco de Paula Santander (a former federalist soldier) eventually defeated by a 38 to 19 vote margin after several heated rounds of voting. Santander and others had been victorious in battle, while Nariño was not, and his popularity had been severely affected. This is also the year where a constituent assembly met in Cúcuta to draft a constitution for the new state.

Nariño returned to Santafé, now officially called Bogotá, in 1821, defeated politically and in poor health, following the many years of struggles and imprisonment. He was appointed military commander, a nominal charge without effective power. By then, he had lost the popularity he had enjoyed in the city during the Foolish Fatherland times. As he had done before with La Bagatela, he decided to create a newspaper: "Los Toros de Fucha" (The Bulls from Fucha), to publish his opposition against Santander and his government, but unlike Lozano, Santander was far from weak, and Nariño instead of returning to power came to be interrogated by Santander. His enemies did not want him to be in power because of his origin from Cundinamarca. According to his biographers (arguably partisans), to make sure he did not get elected they accused him of malfeasance of public funds, cowardice, and treason, but Nariño managed to defend himself. Tired and ill with tuberculosis, he decided to quit his public roles and move to Villa de Leyva. Nariño died there on December 13, 1823, having become a national hero of Colombia.

== Legacy ==
While playing a minor role in the independence war against Spain, Nariño was widely acknowledged at his time and afterwards as a precursor of separatist ideas. He is mentioned in the last stanza of the Colombian national anthem. At the foot of his memorial statue in Bogotá he is quoted: "I have loved my country; only History will say what this love has been."

The presidential palace of the Republic of Colombia, Casa de Nariño or Palacio de Nariño, was constructed at the site of his birthplace and named in his honor.

The department of Nariño was also named in his honor.

Nariño's face has appeared in the $10 and $100 Colombian peso banknotes.

He is featured as a Comandante General in Sid Meier's Civilization 6, available only to users playing as the Gran Colombia civilization.

== Bibliography ==
- Blossom, Thomas (1967). Nariño: Hero of Colombian Independence. Tucson: University of Arizona Press.
- Crow, John A. (1992) [1946]. The Epic of Latin America (4th ed.). Berkeley: University of California Press. ISBN 9780520078680
