= List of presidents of Colombia =

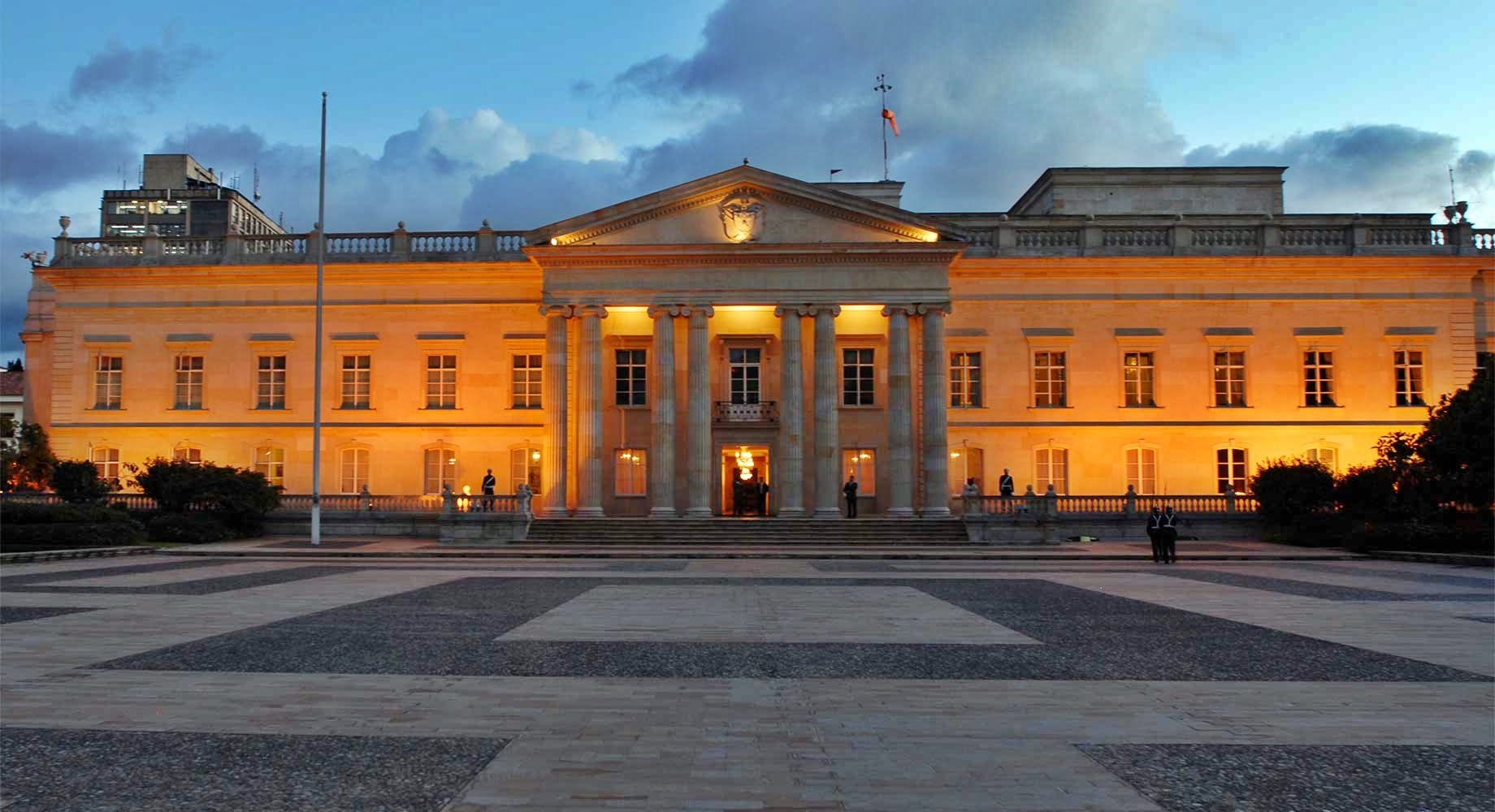
The Casa de Nariño, the president's official residence and centre of the administration.

Under the Colombian Constitution of 1991, the president of Colombia is the head of state and head of government of the Republic of Colombia. As chief of the executive branch and head of the national government as a whole, the presidency is the highest political office in Colombia by influence and recognition. The president is also the commander-in-chief of the Military Forces of Colombia. The president is directly elected to a four-year term in a popular election. Since the passing of the Legislative Act 2 of 2004, no person may be elected president more than twice. In 2015, a constitutional amendment repealed the 2004 changes and reverted to the original one-term limit. Upon the death, resignation, or removal from office of an incumbent president, the vice president assumes the office. The president must be at least 30 years of age and a "natural-born" citizen of Colombia.

== List of presidents during the War of Independence ==
=== Colombian War of Independence (1810–1819) ===
The official list of presidents usually begins with Simón Bolívar as the first president of Colombia in 1819, which is generally regarded as the year in which Colombia achieved its full independence. However, there were several previous politicians, military commanders and officeholders that ruled the nation during the Colombian War of Independence, covering the period between 1810 and 1819. The following is a list of those rulers prior to 1819, considered official by various sources in Colombia, such as the Bank of the Republic, among others.

The following were the leaders who exercised executive power during the First Republic, either as presidents of the Supreme Junta of Santa Fe (1810–1811), presidents of the Free State of Cundinamarca (1811–1814) or presidents of the Congress of the United Provinces of New Granada (1811–1816). Between 1810 and 1813, these rulers exercised power under a de jure constitutional monarchy in personal union with Spain, recognising Ferdinand VII of Spain as their legitimate monarch. However, full independence from Spain and from any other foreign nation was declared in 1813 and the subsequent rulers exercised their power under various types of republican forms of government. Also, between 1811 and 1814, a civil war was waged between the Free State of Cundinamarca, who supported a centralist government for New Granada, and the United Provinces of New Granada, who supported a federalist government. The federalists won the conflict, with the help of Simón Bolívar, after marching on Bogotá on December 1814.

==== New Kingdom of Granada (1810–1813) ====
Supreme Governing Junta of Santa Fe in the New Kingdom of Granada
President of the Supreme Governing Junta of the New Kingdom of Granada
No.	Portrait	Name (Birth–Death)	Place of birth	Elected	Took office	Left office	Political party	Monarch
—		Antonio José Amar y Borbón (1742–1826)	Aragon	1810	20 July 1810	25 July 1810	None (Royalist)	Ferdinand VII (de jure)
1		José Miguel Pey (1763–1838)	Santa Fe	1810	25 July 1810	1 April 1811	None (Centralist)	Ferdinand VII (de jure)

==== Free and Independent State of Cundinamarca (1811–1814) ====
Free and Independent State of Cundinamarca
President of the Free and Independent State of Cundinamarca
No.	Portrait	Name (Birth–Death)	Place of birth	Elected	Took office	Left office	Political party	Monarch
1		Jorge Tadeo Lozano (1771–1816)	Santa Fe	Apr 1811	1 April 1811	29 September 1811	None (Centralist)	Ferdinand VII (de jure)
2		Antonio Nariño (1765–1823)	Santa Fe	Sep 1811	30 September 1811	13 August 1813	None (Centralist)	Ferdinand VII (de jure)
3		Manuel Bernardo Álvarez (1743–1816)	Santa Fe	1813	13 August 1813	12 December 1814	None (Centralist)	Independence declared on 16 July 1813

==== United Provinces of New Granada (1811–1816) ====
United Provinces of New Granada
Secretary of the Congress of the United Provinces of New Granada
No.	Portrait	Name (Birth–Death)	Place of birth	Elected	Took office	Left office	Political party
—		Antonio Nariño (1765–1823)	Santa Fe	1811	27 November 1811	27 October 1812	None (Centralist)
President of the Congress of the United Provinces of New Granada
1		Camilo Torres Tenorio (1766–1816)	Popayán	1812	27 October 1812	5 October 1814	None (Federalist)
Members of the Triumvirate of the United Provinces of New Granada
2		José María del Castillo y Rada (1766–1816)	Cartagena	1814	5 October 1814	25 January 1815	None (Federalist)
2		José Fernández Madrid (1789–1830)	Cartagena	1814	5 October 1814	25 January 1815	None (Federalist)
2		Joaquín Camacho (1766–1816)	Tunja	1814	5 October 1814	25 January 1815	None (Federalist)
2		Custodio García Róvira (1780–1816)	Pamplona	1814	25 November 1814	25 March 1815	None (Federalist)
2		José Miguel Pey (1763–1838)	Santa Fe	1815	25 March 1815	15 November 1815	None (Federalist)
2		Crisanto Valenzuela (1776–1816)	Socorro	1815	25 July 1815	17 August 1815	None (Federalist)
2		Manuel Rodríguez Torices (1788–1816)	Cartagena	1815	28 July 1815	15 November 1815	None (Federalist)
2		Antonio Villavicencio (1775–1816)	Quito	1815	17 August 1815	15 November 1815	None (Federalist)
President of the United Provinces of New Granada
3		Camilo Torres Tenorio (1766–1816)	Popayán	1815	15 November 1815	12 March 1816	None (Federalist)
4		José Fernández Madrid (1789–1830)	Cartagena	1816	14 March 1816	22 June 1816	None (Federalist)
5		Custodio García Róvira (1780–1816)	Pamplona	1816	22 June 1816	16 July 1816	None (Federalist)
6		Fernando Serrano Uribe (1789–1819)	Pamplona	1816	16 July 1816	16 September 1816	None (Federalist)
Interim President of New Granada
—		Juan Nepomuceno Moreno (unknown–1839)	Casanare	1818	18 December 1818	10 September 1819	None (Federalist)

== Official list of presidents ==
=== Republic of Colombia (1819–1832) ===
This list includes those persons who were sworn into, succeeded to, or forcibly took office as president of the Republic of Colombia following the passing of the Colombian Constitution of Cúcuta, which took effect on 30 August 1821. The Republic of Colombia of 1821–1831 is now commonly referred to as the Gran Colombia to differentiate it from the present-day Republic of Colombia. Gran Colombia was the union of the territories that comprised the Viceroyalty of the New Granada under the uti possidetis principle, and it included the political entities that had formed in the New Granada after the initial wars of independence of 1810 against the Kingdom of Spain under King Joseph I; those included the Second Republic of Venezuela, the United Provinces of New Granada, the Presidency of Quito, and the Royal Audiencia of Panama.

The presidency dates back to the Congress of Angostura. This quasi-constituent assembly was formed to lay the ground work for a self-ruled governing administration after independence. The Constituent Assembly was formed by regional leaders that represented areas under rebel control; these areas did not include parts of what is now Colombia, as those areas were still under Spanish control, but aimed to legislate on its behalf. Congress elected an interim-executive officer and vested this figure with the title of president. Chosen to be first president of Colombia, was General Simón Bolívar y Palacios, leader of the revolutionary forces, who up to that point was titled "Supreme Chief" for his role in the revolution. The following day, Congress elected Francisco Antonio Zea Díaz, first vice president of Colombia. Bolívar was subsequently re-elected interim president by the Angostura Assembly on 17 December 1819 after Colombia was conquered following the Battle of Boyacá, and elected again in 1821 in a permanent interim basis, pending national elections, by the Congress of Cúcuta, another constituent assembly mandated by the Angostura Assembly, and this time with elected officials representing the Colombian territories, during this time, and until 1826, the executive power was entrusted to the vice president Francisco de Paula Santander y Omaña, while Bolívar was away in battle fighting to liberate Spanish colonies in Bolivia, and Peru. Bolívar was formally elected in a national election in 1826 for a period of four years, but on 27 August 1828, Bolívar declared martial law and assumed dictatorship style powers after the Congress of Ocaña failed to pass a new constitution. Bolívar eventually relinquished power in 1830, and Congress elected Joaquín de Mosquera y Arboleda as his successor, but was shortly deposed by General Rafael Urdaneta y Faría who hoped Bolívar would once again re-take power, but Bolívar not only declined the presidency, but also shortly died, leaving Urdaneta with no mandate for power. Urdaneta ceded executive-power to the vice president Domingo Caycedo y Sanz de Santamaría, as Congress had impeached Mosquera for his failure to prevent the coup; during this time, and until 1832 the presidency remained vacant as there was no law for succession of power. In 1832, former vice president Santander was elected by Congress as president of Gran Colombia, and it would be the last, since the territories of Venezuela and Ecuador broke away, which prompted the drafting of a new constitution.

President of the Republic of Colombia
No. (Note: For the purposes of numbering, a presidency is defined as an uninterrupted period of time in office served by one person. For example, Rafael Núñez Moledo served two consecutive terms and is counted as the first president (not the first and second). Upon the resignation of 5th president Rafael Reyes Prieto, Ramón González Valencia became the 6th president even though he simply served out the remainder of Reyes's second term and was never elected to the presidency in his own right. Alfonso López Pumarejo was both the 14th president and the 16th president, his two terms having been non-consecutive.) (Note: A period during which a vice-president, a designate, or a caretaker temporarily becomes Acting President under Article 193 of the 1991 Constitution, or before it, under Articles 124 and 125 of the 1886 Constitution, is not a presidency, because the president constitutionally remains in office during such a period.)	Portrait	Name (Birth–Death)	Elected	Took office	Left office	Tenure	Political party	Vice President	Ref.
1		Simón Antonio; Bolívar y Palacios (1783–1830)	1819	15 February 1819	4 May 1830 (Note: Resigned)	11 years, 78 days	Independent	Francisco Antonio Zea Díaz (16 February 1819 – 21 March 1820) Juan Germán Roscio Nieves (Note: Died in office of natural causes) (21 March 1820 – 10 March 1821) Office vacant (10 March 1821 – 4 April 1821) Antonio Nariño y Álvarez (4 April 1821 – 6 June 1821) José María del Castillo y Rada (6 June 1821 – 3 October 1821) Francisco de Paula Santander (3 October 1821 – 27 August 1828) Office vacant (27 August 1828 – 4 May 1830)	(Note: Francisco de Paula Santander y Omaña served as acting president from 13 December 1821 – 14 November 1826) (Note: Estanislao Vergara y Sanz de Santamaría served as acting president from 10 November to 10 December 1829)
1		Simón Antonio; Bolívar y Palacios (1783–1830)	1821	15 February 1819	4 May 1830	11 years, 78 days	Independent	Francisco Antonio Zea Díaz (16 February 1819 – 21 March 1820) Juan Germán Roscio Nieves (21 March 1820 – 10 March 1821) Office vacant (10 March 1821 – 4 April 1821) Antonio Nariño y Álvarez (4 April 1821 – 6 June 1821) José María del Castillo y Rada (6 June 1821 – 3 October 1821) Francisco de Paula Santander (3 October 1821 – 27 August 1828) Office vacant (27 August 1828 – 4 May 1830)	(Note: Francisco de Paula Santander y Omaña served as acting president from 13 December 1821 – 14 November 1826) (Note: Estanislao Vergara y Sanz de Santamaría served as acting president from 10 November to 10 December 1829)
1		Simón Antonio; Bolívar y Palacios (1783–1830)	1825	15 February 1819	4 May 1830	11 years, 78 days	Independent	Francisco Antonio Zea Díaz (16 February 1819 – 21 March 1820) Juan Germán Roscio Nieves (21 March 1820 – 10 March 1821) Office vacant (10 March 1821 – 4 April 1821) Antonio Nariño y Álvarez (4 April 1821 – 6 June 1821) José María del Castillo y Rada (6 June 1821 – 3 October 1821) Francisco de Paula Santander (3 October 1821 – 27 August 1828) Office vacant (27 August 1828 – 4 May 1830)	(Note: Francisco de Paula Santander y Omaña served as acting president from 13 December 1821 – 14 November 1826) (Note: Estanislao Vergara y Sanz de Santamaría served as acting president from 10 November to 10 December 1829)
2		Joaquín Mariano de Mosquera y Arboleda (1787–1878)	1830	4 May 1830	4 September 1830	123 days	Independent	Domingo Caycedo	(Note: Domingo Caycedo y Sanz de Santamaría served as acting president from 4 May to 15 June 1830, and again from 2 August to 18 August 1830)
3		Rafael José; Urdaneta y Farías (1788–1845)	—	4 September 1830 (Note: Took power by coup d'état.)	30 April 1831	238 days	Independent	Office suspended	
Office vacant			—	30 April 1831	10 March 1832	315 days	N/A	Domingo Caycedo (30 April 1831 – 21 November 1831) José María Obando del Campo (21 November – 10 March 1832)	
4		Francisco de Paula; Santander y Omaña (1792–1840)	1832	10 March 1832	1 April 1837	5 years, 22 days	Independent	José Ignacio de Márquez	(Note: José Ignacio de Márquez Barreto served as acting president from 10 March to 7 October 1832)

=== Republic of New Granada (1832–1858) ===
This list includes those persons who were sworn into, succeeded to, or forcibly took office as president of the Republic of New Granada following the passing of the Colombian Constitution of 1832, which took effect on 26 November 1832.

There were 8 people in office serving a presidency each. All were popularly elected under an electoral college system except one, José María Melo y Ortiz who took power by mounting a coup d'état. Francisco de Paula Santander y Omaña, the first president, served initially on a provisional basis but in 1833 began a regular four-year term as president of the Republic of New Granada, to which he was popularly elected. Santander spent the longest time in office with 5 years and 22 days. José María Obando del Campo spent the shortest time in office with just 1 year and 6 days before being deposed.

The president and the vice president were elected separately two years apart for a period of four years each, resulting in a president having two vice presidents given normal circumstances. The Colombian Constitution of 1832, just like its predecessor, did not provide for a way to fill a vacancy in the presidency or the vicepresidency until the next electoral period, because of this the presidency was vacant between 1854 and 1857 when Melo, who had deposed President Obando in a coup, handed power to the previous administration; Obando would have taken back the presidency, but he had been impeached by Congress and hence there was no president to take power. During this time Vice President José de Obaldía y Orejuela served as acting president until the end of his term, at which point the newly elected vice president Manuel María Mallarino Ibargüen served as acting president for the remainder of the term Obando had been elected for until 1857 when Mariano Ospina Rodríguez was elected. The vice presidency was also vacant between 1837 and 1839, when Vice President José Ignacio de Márquez Barreto was elected president and the post remained vacant until the next vice presidencial election in 1839.

Political parties

Conservative Party
Liberal Party

President of the Republic of New Granada
No.	Portrait	Name (Birth–Death)	Elected	Took office	Left office	Tenure	Political party	Vice President	Ref.
1		Francisco de Paula; Santander y Omaña (1792–1840)	1832	10 March 1832	1 April 1837	5 years, 22 days	Independent	José Ignacio de Márquez (10 March 1832 – 1 April 1833) Joaquín Mosquera Arboleda (1 April 1833 – 1 April 1835) José Ignacio de Márquez (1 April 1835 – 1 April 1837)	
1		Francisco de Paula; Santander y Omaña (1792–1840)	1833	10 March 1832	1 April 1837	5 years, 22 days	Independent	José Ignacio de Márquez (10 March 1832 – 1 April 1833) Joaquín Mosquera Arboleda (1 April 1833 – 1 April 1835) José Ignacio de Márquez (1 April 1835 – 1 April 1837)	
2		José Ignacio de Márquez Barreto (1793–1880)	1837	1 April 1837	1 April 1841	4 years, 0 days	Independent (Ministerials)	Office vacant (1 April 1837 – 1 April 1839) Domingo Caycedo (1 April 1839–1 April 1841)	
3		Pedro Alcántara; Herrán Martínez (1800–1872)	1841	1 April 1841	1 April 1845	4 years, 0 days	Independent (Ministerials)	Domingo Caycedo (1 April 1841 – 1 April 1843) Joaquín José Gori (1 April 1843 – 1 April 1845)	(Note: Juan de Dios Aranzazu González served as acting president from 5 July 1841 to 19 May 1842)
4		Tomás Cipriano de Mosquera y Arboleda (1798–1878)	1845	1 April 1845	1 April 1849	4 years, 0 days	Independent (Ministerials)	Joaquín José Gori (1 April 1845 – 1 April 1847) Rufino Cuervo y Barreto (1 April 1847 – 1 April 1849)	(Note: Rufino Cuervo y Barreto served as acting president from 14 August to 14 December 1847))
5		José Hilario; López Valdéz (1798–1869)	1849	1 April 1849	1 April 1853	4 years, 0 days	Liberal Party	Rufino Cuervo y Barreto (1 April 1849 – 1 April 1851) José de Obaldía y Orejuela (1 April 1851 – 1 April 1853)	
6		José María; Obando del Campo (1795–1861)	1853	1 April 1853	17 April 1854	1 year, 16 days	Liberal Party	José de Obaldía y Orejuela	
7		José María; Melo y Ortiz (1800–1860)	—	17 April 1854	4 December 1854	231 days	Liberal Party (Draconians)	José de Obaldía y Orejuela	(Note: Francisco Antonio Obregón Muñoz served as acting president from 20 May to 2 June 1854)
Office vacant			—	4 December 1854	1 April 1857	2 years, 118 days	N/A	José de Obaldía y Orejuela (4 December 1854 – 1 April 1855) Manuel María Mallarino (1 April 1855 – 1 April 1857)	(Note: José de Obaldía y Orejuela served as acting president from 5 August 1854 to 1 April 1855) (Note: Manuel María Mallarino Ibargüen served as acting president from 1 April 1855 to 1 April 1857)
8		Mariano; Ospina Rodríguez (1805–1885)	1857	1 April 1857	1 April 1861	4 years, 0 days	Conservative Party	Manuel María Mallarino (Note: The Constitution of 1858 abolished the Office of the Vice President, the line of succession was modified placing the Government Ministers from oldest to youngest to succeed the President in the event of the President's temporal or permanent absence.) (1 April 1857 – 1 April 1859)	

=== Granadine Confederation (1858–1863) ===
This list includes those persons who were sworn into, succeeded to, or forcibly took office as president of the Granadine Confederation following the passing of the Colombian Constitution of 1858, which took effect on 22 May 1858.

The Constitution of 1858 abolished the Office of the Vice Presidency. The line of succession was modified by the introduction of the figures of 1st, 2nd, and 3rd Presidential Designates, who were elected annually by Congress amongst its members, but held no office or duties other than providing a succession to the presidency in the event of the president's temporal or permanent absence.

There were only three people in office who served a presidency each. Mariano Ospina Rodríguez initially took office in 1857 as the 8th and last president of the Republic of New Granada. In 1861 Julio Arboleda Pombo became the first person to be elected President of the Granadine Confederation under the new electoral college system set up by the new constitution, however during this time the country was going through a civil war and Congress was closed down. Furthermore, according to the new constitution the president had to take office before Congress; since this couldn't happen, Pombo could not take office and did not become the president. When Ospina's term ended on 1 April 1861, with no congress to swear in the elected president, the power would have been transferred to one of the Presidential Designates, however with Congress closed down no designates were elected for that year, and with no designates to succeed Ospina, the presidency was handed out to the next person in the line of succession which was the Inspector General, Bartolomé Calvo Díaz. Calvo's presidential tenure was short; within three months of holding the post, General Tomás Cipriano de Mosquera y Arboleda, leader of the Liberal forces, marched into Bogotá deposing Calvo in a coup d'état.

Giving the great animosity between Conservatives and Liberals at the time of the 1860-62 civil war, another thing that marked this period in regards to the presidency was that there were multiple attempts to undermine the government in power by laying claims on the presidency using various arguments. The first one of these was the Liberal General Juan José Nieto Gil, who claimed the presidency by disregarding the legitimacy of Ospina and claiming power in virtue of being the second presidential designate; he finally ceded power to his fellow Liberal General, Mosquera, when he took power in Bogotá. Mosquera had also claimants to the presidency in opposition to him. Julio Arboleda Pombo who was elected president but could not take office was appointed inspector general by President Calvo when he was in power, thus when Mosquera captured him, Arboleda claimed the presidency as the next in theline of succession to Calvo, even though that by this time the government and city had fallen, and the Conservative administration had fled the capital. After Arboleda was also captured by Mosquera a few days after Calvo was taken prisoner, the Secretary of Finance, Ignacio Gutierrez Vergara, succeeded Arboleda to the claimed presidency as next in the line of succession being the oldest government secretary of the previous administration. When Gutiérrez was captured by Mosquera, the next in line of succession by age was the Secretary of Government and War, General Leonardo Canal González. As pretender to presidency, he moved the capital of the nation to Pasto, where he led the Conservative Government in exile. In 1862 Canal left to fight the Liberal forces and left Manuel del Río y de Narváez, his Secretary of Government and War, as acting president of the government-in-exile. This struggle for power all came to an end in 1863 when del Río finally capitulated to Mosquera presenting the surrender of the government-in-exile and recognising the presidency of Mosquera bringing the civil war to an end.

Political parties

Conservative Party
Liberal Party

President of the Granadine Confederation
No.	Portrait	Name (Birth–Death)	Elected	Took office	Left office	Tenure	Political party	Vice President	Ref.
1		Mariano; Ospina Rodríguez (1805–1885)	1857	1 April 1857	1 April 1861	4 years, 0 days	Conservative Party	Office abolished	(Note: Juan José Nieto Gil claimed the presidency in rebellion from 25 January to 18 July 1861)
2		Bartolomé; Calvo Díaz (1815–1889)	1860	1 April 1861	18 July 1861	108 days	Conservative Party	Office abolished	
3		Juan José; Nieto Gil (1804–1866)	—	25 January 1861	18 July 1861	174 days	Liberal Party	Office abolished	
4		Tomás Cipriano de Mosquera y Arboleda (1798–1878)	—	18 July 1861	4 February 1863	1 year, 201 days	Liberal Party	Office abolished	(Note: Andrés Cerón Serrano served as acting president in February 1862) (Note: Julio Arboleda Pombo claimed the presidency in rebellion from 10 July to 18 July 1861)) (Note: Ignacio Gutiérrez Vergara claimed the presidency in rebellion from 18 July 1861 to 18 January 1862) (Note: Leonardo Canal González claimed the presidency in rebellion from 18 July 1861 to 6 November 1862) (Note: Manuel del Río y de Narváez claimed the presidency in rebellion from 6 November 1862 to 13 January 1863)

=== United States of Colombia (1863–1886) ===
This list includes those persons who were sworn into, succeeded to, or forcibly took office as president of the United States of Colombia following the passing of the Colombian Constitution of 1863, which took effect on 8 May 1863.

There were 11 people in office, and 14 presidencies as three presidents served two non-consecutive terms each and are counted chronologically twice, they are: Tomás Cipriano de Mosquera y Arboleda, Manuel Murillo Toro, and Rafael Núñez Moledo, the last two having actually been elected twice. Out of the 11 individuals in office, 9 were elected, one succeeded to the presidency (José Eusebio Otálora Martínez), and one took the presidency by mounting a coup d'état (Santos Acosta Castillo). Only one president died in office from natural causes (Francisco Javier Zaldúa y Racines).

Tomás Cipriano de Mosquera y Arboleda, the first president of the United States of Colombia, had actually started his tenure in 1861 (he became the third and last president of the Granadine Confederation with a coup). In this capacity he was appointed by the National Constituent Assembly of 1863 to continue serving while the assembly drafted, passed, signed, and implemented a new constitution. The first elected president of the United States of Colombia was Manuel Murillo Toro, elected in 1864 for a constitutional two-year term. The longest serving president was Rafael Núñez Moledo with 10 years, 5 months, and 17 days, of which only 2 years, 4 months, and 5 days were actually served as the elected president of the United States of Colombia, but still longer than anyone else. Francisco Javier Zaldúa y Racines spent the shortest time in office with just 8 months, and 20 days in 1882.

The Colombian Constitution of 1858 had effectively abolished the vice presidency, and introduced a new line of succession system featuring the figures of first, second, and third Presidential designates. These designates were elected annually by Congress amongst its members, but held no office or duties other than providing a succession for the president in the event of the resident's temporal or permanent absence. Both changes to vice presidency and presidential designates were kept by the Colombian Constitution of 1863. This system of succession was implemented in 1882 when President Zaldúa died in office and the third presidential designate, Clímaco Calderón Reyes, became acting president while the first presidential designate, Rafael Núñez Moledo, took office, however Núñez turned down the presidency and therefore the second presidential designate, José Eusebio Otálora Martínez, succeeded Zaldúa to presidency.

Political parties

Liberal Party

President of the United States of Colombia
No.	Portrait	Name (Birth–Death)	Elected	Took office	Left office	Tenure	Political party	Vice President	Ref.
1		Tomás Cipriano de Mosquera y Arboleda (1798–1878)	1863	14 May 1863	1 April 1864	323 days	Liberal Party (Radicals)	Office abolished (Note: The Constitution of 1858 had abolished the Office of the Vice President, this decision was upheld by the Constitution of 1863, but the line of succession was modified differently by the introduction of the figures of 1st, 2nd, and 3rd Presidential Designates, who were elected annually by Congress amongst its members, but held no office or duties other than providing a succession for the President in the event of the president's temporal or permanent absence.)	(Note: Juan Agustín de Uricoechea y Rocha served as acting president from 29 January to 28 February 1864)
2		Manuel; Murillo Toro (1816–1880)	1864	1 April 1864	1 April 1866	2 years, 0 days	Liberal Party (Radicals)	Office abolished	
3		Tomás Cipriano de Mosquera y Arboleda (1798–1878)	1866	1 April 1866	23 May 1867	1 year, 52 days	Liberal Party (Moderates)	Office abolished	(Note: José María Rojas Garrido served as acting president from 1 April to 22 May 1866)
4		Santos; Acosta Castillo (1828–1901)	—	23 May 1867	1 April 1868	314 days	Liberal Party (Radicals)	Office abolished	
5		Santos; Gutiérrez Prieto (1820–1872)	1868	1 April 1868	1 April 1870	2 years, 0 days	Liberal Party (Radicals)	Office abolished	(Note: Salvador Camacho Roldán served as acting president from 21 December 1868 to 2 January 1869)
6		Eustorgio; Salgar Moreno (1831–1885)	1870	1 April 1870	1 April 1872	2 years, 0 days	Liberal Party (Radicals)	Office abolished	
7		Manuel; Murillo Toro (1816–1880)	1872	1 April 1872	1 April 1874	2 years, 0 days	Liberal Party (Radicals)	Office abolished	
8		Santiago; Pérez de Manosalbas (1830–1900)	1874	1 April 1874	1 April 1876	2 years, 0 days	Liberal Party (Radicals)	Office abolished	
9		Aquileo; Parra Gómez (1825–1900)	1876	1 April 1876	1 April 1878	2 years, 0 days	Liberal Party (Radicals)	Office abolished	(Note: José Sergio Camargo Pinzón served as acting president from 19 May to 14 August 1877) (Note: Manuel María Ramírez Fortoul served as acting president from 22 December to 24 December 1877)
10		Julián; Trujillo Largacha (1828–1883)	1878	1 April 1878	1 April 1880	2 years, 0 days	Liberal Party (Radicals)	Office abolished	
11		Rafael; Núñez Moledo (1825–1894)	1880	1 April 1880	1 April 1882	2 years, 0 days	Liberal Party (Independents)	Office abolished	
12		Francisco Javier; Zaldúa y Racines (1811–1882)	1882	1 April 1882	21 December 1882	264 days	Liberal Party (Independents)	Office abolished	
13		José Eusebio; Otálora Martínez (1826–1884)	—	21 December 1882	1 April 1884	1 year, 102 days	Liberal Party (Independents)	Office abolished	(Note: Clímaco Calderón Reyes served as acting president from 21 December to 22 December 1882)
14		Rafael; Núñez Moledo (1825–1894)	1884	1 April 1884	1 April 1886	2 years, 0 days	Liberal Party (Independents)	Office abolished	(Note: Ezequiel Hurtado Hurtado served as acting president from 1 April to 11 August 1884) (Note: José María Campo Serrano served as acting president from 1 April to 7 August 1886)

=== Republic of Colombia (1886–present) ===
This list includes those persons who were sworn into, succeeded to, or forcibly took office as president of the present-day Republic of Colombia following the passing of the Colombian Constitution of 1886, which took effect on 6 August 1886. For Colombian leaders before this, see the above lists.

There have been 33 men in office, and 35 presidencies as Alfonso López Pumarejo served two non-consecutive terms and is counted chronologically as both the 14th and 16th president, Alberto Lleras Camargo succeeded the presidency first in 1945 and later was elected to office in 1958. Out of the 33 individuals in office, 28 were elected president, four succeeded to the presidency (Miguel Antonio Caro Tobar, Ramón González Valencia, Jorge Holguín Mallarino and Alberto Lleras Camargo), two took the presidency by mounting a coup d'état (José Manuel Marroquín Ricaurte and Gustavo Rojas Pinilla against Manuel Antonio Sanclemente Sanclemente and Laureano Gómez Castro respectively), three permanently resigned from office (Rafael Reyes Prieto, Marco Fidel Suárez and Alfonso López Pumarejo) and one died in office of natural causes (Rafael Núñez Moledo).

Rafael Núñez Moledo, the first president, was actually inaugurated in 1884 as the 14th and last president of the United States of Colombia for a two-year constitutional term; in this capacity he was appointed by the National Constituent Assembly of 1885 to serve a new six-year term while the assembly drafted, passed, signed, and implemented a new constitution; at the end of this term he was elected in 1892 for his first constitutional six-year term as president of Colombia. Núñez spent the longest time in office with 10 years, 5 months, and 17 days, but having only spent 2 years, 1 month, and 11 days as the elected president of Colombia before his death. The longest serving elected presidents were Álvaro Uribe Vélez with 8 years between 2002 and 2010, having been re-elected for a second term in 2006 and Juan Manuel Santos with 8 years between 2010 and 2018, re-elected in 2014. Ramón González Valencia spent the shortest time in office with just 1 year between 1909 and 1910 when he was elected by Congress to finish the term that President Rafael Reyes Prieto had resigned to. The shortest serving elected president was Manuel Antonio Sanclemente Sanclemente with 1 year, 11 months, and 24 days before he was deposed. Carlos Eugenio Restrepo Restrepo, was the first president to serve under the new four-year constitutional term after the Constitutional Reform of 1910 when he was appointed president by that year's National Constituent Assembly; the first elected president to serve the four-year constitutional term would be his successor, José Vicente Concha Ferreira elected in 1914. Eduardo Santos Montejo was the first to be elected by men of all classes in 1938 after all land-ownership and literacy restrictions were repealed by the Constitutional Reform of 1936. Alberto Lleras Camargo in 1958 became the first president elected after women gained voting rights after the Constitutional Reform of 1954.

The vice presidency was abolished after the Constitutional Reform of 1905 and was only re-introduced after the passing of the Colombian Constitution of 1991 which remains in place. Article 127 of the Colombian Constitution of 1886 only allowed for re-election of the president in a non-immediate form; this was changed by the Constitutional Reform of 2005 allowing for immediate re-elections for a maximum of two terms.

Under the Colombian Constitution of 1991, the President of Colombia is the head of state and head of government of the Republic of Colombia. As chief of the executive branch and head of the national government as a whole, the presidency is the highest political office in Colombia as measure by influence and recognition. The president is also the commander-in-chief of the military of Colombia. The president is directly elected to a four-year term in a popular election. The Legislative Act 2 of 2004 established that no person may be elected president more than twice, allowing Álvaro Uribe and Juan Manuel Santos consecutive reelection in 2006 and 2014 respectively. Nonetheless, in 2015 Congress reformed the Constitution again and suppressed consecutive and non-consecutive presidential reelection. Since 1991 Constitution it was established that if no presidential candidate obtain more than 50% of the popular vote a run-off vote is needed. Upon the death, resignation, or removal from office of an incumbent president, the vice president assumes the office. The president must be at least 30 years of age and a "natural-born" citizen of Colombia.

Political parties

National Party
Conservative Party
Liberal Party
Republican Union Party
Military Forces of Colombia
Colombia First
Social Party of National Unity
Democratic Center
Humane Colombia
Defenders of the Homeland

President of the Republic of Colombia
No.	Portrait	Name (Birth–Death)	Elected	Took office	Left office	Tenure	Political party	Vice President	Ref.
1		Rafael; Núñez Moledo (1825–1894)	1886	1 April 1886 (Note: President Núñez had actually taken office on 1 April 1884 for a two year term as stipulated by Article 79 of the 1863 Constitution. In 1886, he was appointed by the National Constituent Council to serve a new six year term starting on 7 August 1886 as stipulated by Article A of the new 1886 Constitution that created the present-day Republic of Colombia. In 1892 he started his first elected term as president, the previous term having been an appointment to safeguard the passing and implementation of the new constitution and therefore was not in conflict with Article 127 of the 1886 Constitution that prohibited the immediate re-election of a president.)	18 September 1894	8 years, 170 days	National Party	Eliseo Payán Hurtado (7 August 1886 – 7 August 1892) Miguel Antonio Caro (7 August 1892 – 18 September 1894)	(Note: José María Campo Serrano served as acting president from 7 August 1886 to 5 January 1887) (Note: Eliseo Payán Hurtado served as acting president from 5 January to 4 June 1887, and again from 12 December 1887 to 8 February 1888) (Note: Carlos Holguín Mallarino served as acting president from 7 August 1888 to 7 August 1892) (Note: Miguel Antonio Caro Tobar served as acting president from 7 August to 21 September 1892) (Note: Antonio Basilio Cuervo Urisarri served as acting president from 16 January to 17 January 1893)
1		Rafael; Núñez Moledo (1825–1894)	1892	1 April 1886	18 September 1894	8 years, 170 days	National Party	Eliseo Payán Hurtado (7 August 1886 – 7 August 1892) Miguel Antonio Caro (7 August 1892 – 18 September 1894)	
2		Miguel Antonio; Caro Tobar (1845–1909)	—	18 September 1894	7 August 1898	3 years, 323 days	National Party	Office vacant (Note: Prior to the abolishment of the Office of Vice President in 1905, Article 131 of the 1886 Constitution did not allow for a vacancy in the vice presidency to be filled until the end of the constitutionally elected term.)	(Note: Guillermo Quintero Calderón served as acting president from 12 March to 17 March 1896)
3		Manuel Antonio; Sanclemente Sanclemente (1814–1902)	1898	7 August 1898	31 July 1900	1 year, 358 days	National Party	José Manuel Marroquín	
4		José Manuel; Marroquín Ricaurte (1827–1908)	—	31 July 1900	7 August 1904	4 years, 7 days	Conservative Party	Office vacant	
5		Rafael; Reyes Prieto (1849–1921)	1904	7 August 1904	27 July 1909	4 years, 354 days	Conservative Party	Ramón González Valencia (7 August 1904 – 10 March 1905) Office abolished (Note: The Office of the Vice President was officially abolished by the 1905 National Constituent Assembly on 28 March 1905, and it was only reinstituted after the ratification of the new 1991 Constitution with Vice President de la Calle taking office after the following presidential elections in 1994.) (10 March 1905 – 27 July 1909)	(Note: Diego Euclides de Angulo Lemos served as acting president from 16 March to 16 April 1908) (Note: Jorge Holguín Mallarino served as acting president from 27 July to 4 August 1909)
6		Ramón; González Valencia (1851–1928)	—	7 August 1909	7 August 1910	1 year, 0 days	Conservative Party	Office abolished	
7		Carlos Eugenio; Restrepo Restrepo (1867–1937)	1910	7 August 1910	7 August 1914 (Note: The 1910 National Constituent Assembly amended Article 114 of the 1886 Constitution changing the length of a presidential term from that of six years to one of four years.)	4 years, 0 days	Republican Union Party (Conservative Party) (Note: Although nominally head of the newly created Republican Union party, Restrepo was a long-time member of the Conservative Party.)	Office abolished	
8		José Vicente; Concha Ferreira (1867–1929)	1914	7 August 1914	7 August 1918	4 years, 0 days	Conservative Party	Office abolished	
9		Marco Fidel; Suárez Barrientos (1855–1927)	1918	7 August 1918	11 November 1921	3 years, 96 days	Conservative Party	Office abolished	
10		Jorge; Holguín Mallarino (1848–1928)	—	11 November 1921	7 August 1922	269 days	Conservative Party	Office abolished	
11		Pedro Nel; Ospina Vázquez (1858–1927)	1922	7 August 1922	7 August 1926	4 years, 0 days	Conservative Party	Office abolished	
12		Miguel; Abadía Méndez (1867–1947)	1926	7 August 1926	7 August 1930	4 years, 0 days	Conservative Party	Office abolished	
13		Enrique; Olaya Herrera (1880–1937)	1930	7 August 1930	7 August 1934	4 years, 0 days	Liberal Party	Office abolished	
14		Alfonso; López Pumarejo (1886–1959)	1934	7 August 1934	7 August 1938	4 years, 0 days	Liberal Party	Office abolished	
15		Eduardo; Santos Montejo (1888–1974)	1938	7 August 1938	7 August 1942	4 years, 0 days	Liberal Party	Office abolished	
16		Alfonso; López Pumarejo (1886–1959)	1942	7 August 1942	7 August 1945	3 years, 0 days	Liberal Party	Office abolished	(Note: Carlos Lozano y Lozano served as acting president from 9 October to 19 October 1942) (Note: Darío Echandía Olaya served as acting president from 16 May to 10 July 1944)
17		Alberto; Lleras Camargo (1906–1990)	—	7 August 1945	7 August 1946	1 year, 0 days	Liberal Party	Office abolished	
18		Mariano; Ospina Pérez (1891–1976)	1946	7 August 1946	7 August 1950	4 years, 0 days	Conservative Party	Office abolished	
19		Laureano; Gómez Castro (1889–1965)	1949	7 August 1950	13 June 1953	2 years, 310 days	Conservative Party	Office abolished	(Note: Roberto Urdaneta Arbeláez served as acting president from 5 November 1951 to 13 June 1953)
20		Gustavo; Rojas Pinilla (1900–1975)	1954	13 June 1953	10 May 1957	3 years, 331 days	Military Forces of Colombia	Office abolished	(Note: Gabriel París Gordillo served as acting president from 30 July to 3 August 1955)
—		Gabriel; París Gordillo (1910–2008) de facto president	—	10 May 1957	7 August 1958	1 year, 89 days	Military Forces of Colombia	Office abolished	(Note: Chairman of the Colombian Military Junta who ruled as de facto president. Other members of the junta included Deogracias Fonseca Espinosa, Rubén Piedrahíta Arango, Rafael Navas Pardo, and Luis Ernesto Ordóñez Castillo)
21		Alberto; Lleras Camargo (1906–1990)	1958	7 August 1958	7 August 1962	4 years, 0 days	Liberal Party (National Front) (Note: Between 1958 and 1974 the presidency, under the National Front alternation plan, was held in an alternating manner by members of the two traditional parties: Liberals and Conservatives.)	Office abolished	
22		Guillermo León; Valencia Muñoz (1909–1971)	1962	7 August 1962	7 August 1966	4 years, 0 days	Conservative Party (National Front)	Office abolished	(Note: José Antonio Montalvo Berbeo served as acting president from 6 August to 8 August 1963)
23		Carlos; Lleras Restrepo (1908–1994)	1966	7 August 1966	7 August 1970	4 years, 0 days	Liberal Party (National Front)	Office abolished	
24		Misael; Pastrana Borrero (1923–1997)	1970	7 August 1970	7 August 1974	4 years, 0 days	Conservative Party (National Front)	Office abolished	(Note: Rafael Azuero Manchola served as acting president from 21 July to 24 July 1973)
25		Alfonso; López Michelsen (1913–2007)	1974	7 August 1974	7 August 1978	4 years, 0 days	Liberal Party	Office abolished	(Note: Indalecio Liévano Aguirre served as acting president from 20 September to 24 September 1975)
26		Julio César; Turbay Ayala (1916–2005)	1978	7 August 1978	7 August 1982	4 years, 0 days	Liberal Party	Office abolished	(Note: Víctor Mosquera Chaux served as acting president from 3 February to 11 February 1981)
27		Belisario; Betancur Cuartas (1923–2018)	1982	7 August 1982	7 August 1986	4 years, 0 days	Conservative Party	Office abolished	
28		Virgilio; Barco Vargas (1921–1997)	1986	7 August 1986	7 August 1990	4 years, 0 days	Liberal Party	Office abolished	
29		César; Gaviria Trujillo (born 1947)	1990	7 August 1990	7 August 1994	4 years, 0 days	Liberal Party	Office abolished	
30		Ernesto; Samper Pizano (born 1950)	1994	7 August 1994	7 August 1998	4 years, 0 days	Liberal Party	Humberto De la Calle (7 August 1994 – 19 September 1997) Carlos Lemos Simmonds (19 September 1997 – 7 August 1998)	(Note: Carlos Lemos Simmonds served as acting president from 11 January to 21 January 1998)
31		Andrés; Pastrana Arango (born 1954)	1998	7 August 1998	7 August 2002	4 years, 0 days	Conservative Party	Gustavo Bell	
32		Álvaro; Uribe Vélez (born 1952)	2002	7 August 2002	7 August 2010 (Note: Álvaro Uribe Vélez was the first president to have been legally allowed to seek an immediate second term by the 2nd Legislative Act of 2004 that amended Article 197 of the 1991 Constitution. Before that, the 1886 Constitution allowed presidents to seek a second term only in non-consecutive periods.)	8 years, 0 days	Colombia First	Francisco Santos Calderón	
32		Álvaro; Uribe Vélez (born 1952)	2006	7 August 2002	7 August 2010	8 years, 0 days	Colombia First	Francisco Santos Calderón	
33		Juan Manuel; Santos Calderón (born 1951)	2010	7 August 2010	7 August 2018	8 years, 0 days	Social Party of National Unity	Angelino Garzón (7 August 2010 – 7 August 2014) German Vargas Lleras (7 August 2014 – 21 March 2017) Óscar Naranjo (29 March 2017 – 7 August 2018)	
33		Juan Manuel; Santos Calderón (born 1951)	2014	7 August 2010	7 August 2018	8 years, 0 days	Social Party of National Unity	Angelino Garzón (7 August 2010 – 7 August 2014) German Vargas Lleras (7 August 2014 – 21 March 2017) Óscar Naranjo (29 March 2017 – 7 August 2018)	
34		Iván; Duque Márquez (born 1976)	2018	7 August 2018	7 August 2022	4 years, 0 days	Democratic Center	Marta Lucía Ramírez	
35		Gustavo; Petro Urrego (born 1960)	2022	7 August 2022	7 August 2026	4 years, 0 days	Humane Colombia (Historic Pact)	Francia Márquez	
36		Abelardo de la Espriella Otero (born 1978)	2026	7 August 2026	Incumbent	107 days	Defenders of the Homeland	José Manuel Restrepo	

== See also ==
- List of vice presidents of Colombia
- List of presidential designates of Colombia
- List of viceroys of New Granada
