= Presidential elections in Colombia =

Presidential elections in Colombia are the process by which the Colombian people directly elect the President and Vice-President of the Republic of Colombia via a popular vote.

== Electoral process ==
In order to serve as President of the Republic of Colombia, one must be Colombian by birth, a citizen in good standing, and at least 30 years of age. No one who has incurred one of the grounds for incapacity, or who has held public office up to a year prior to the election, can be elected president or vice-president.

== History ==
Under the constitutions of 1832 and 1843 (in elections from 1833 to 1853) the President of the Republic of New Granada was elected by an Electoral College, composed of citizens elected by popular vote in each constituency.

With the constitutions of 1853 and 1858, the President of New Granada (1857) and of the Granadine Confederation (1861, though this election was invalidated) were elected by universal vote. After the passage of the constitution of 1863, the President of the United States of Colombia (in elections between 1864 and 1886) was elected via a system by which each state had one vote, making a total of nine valid votes.

With the constitution of 1886 came a return to election of the President of the Republic of Colombia (from 1892 to 1904) via the aforementioned electoral college system.

In 1910, the Constituent Assembly that amended the constitution chose the president, and decreed that from 1914 elections would again be via universal vote.

Between 1910 and 1990, presidential elections only elected the president, as the constitutional reform of 1910 eliminated the position of vice-president.

The constitution of 1991 reinstated the election of a vice-president, on a ticket with the president, and established a second-round voting process if no candidate achieves an absolute majority of valid votes.

== Suffrage ==
The President of the Republic is elected for a period of four years, by the greater part of the votes that citizens deposit directly and secretly on the date and by the methods established by law. The Electoral Organization is required to equitably provide voters with a ballot on which incorporated political movements, parties, and candidates must be identified clearly and under equal conditions. This is known as the cédula de ciudadanía, or "citizenship card."

== Presidential second round ==
If no candidate obtains an absolute majority, a new vote is held three weeks later, in which only the two candidates that obtained the highest vote totals participate. The candidate who obtains the greatest number of votes in this second round is will declared President. In case of death, assassination, or permanent physical incapacity of one of the two candidates with the highest number of votes, their party or political movement can choose a new candidate for the second round. If this is not done, or if the vacancy is due to another cause, whoever obtained the third highest vote total will replace that candidate, and so on successively in descending order. If the vacancy occurs within two weeks prior to the second round, the vote will be postponed for fifteen days.

== Presidential elections ==
Type of suffrage	Constitution	Date
Male censitary suffrage	State of New Granada Constitution	1833 • 1837 • 1841
Male censitary suffrage	Republic of New Granada Constitution	1845 • 1849 • 1853 • 1857
Male censitary suffrage	Granadine Confederation Constitution	1861
Male censitary suffrage	Constitution of the United States of Colombia	1864 • 1866 • 1868 • 1870 • 1872 • 1874 • 1876 • 1878 • 1880 • 1882 • 1884
voto censitario y masculino	1886 Constitution of the Republic of Colombia	1892 • 1898 • 1904 • 1910 • 1914 • 1918 • 1922 • 1926 • 1930 • 1934 • 1938 • 1942 • 1946 • 1949
Voto universal	1886 Constitution of the Republic of Colombia	1958 • 1962 • 1966 • 1970 • 1974 • 1978 • 1982 • 1986 • 1990
Voto universal	1991 Constitution of the Republic of Colombia	1994 • 1998 •2002 • 2006 •2010 • 2014 • 2018 • 2022 • 2026

== See also ==
- President of Colombia
- Legislative elections in Colombia
- Regional elections in Colombia
