= List of vice presidents of Colombia =

The vice president of Colombia is the second-highest-ranking official in the executive branch of the government of Colombia, after the president of Colombia.Vice Presidents have exercised this latter power to varying degrees. There have been 13 Vice Presidents of Colombia since the office was created in 1886 and reinstated in 1994. The current Vice President is José Manuel Restrepo, who assumed office as the 14th Vice President on August 7, 2026. The Vice President is first in the presidential line of succession; that is, they assume the presidency if the President dies, resigns, or is removed from office through impeachment. Three Vice Presidents have ascended to the presidency in this manner.

Before the Constituent Assembly of 1905, a vacancy during the Vice President's term could not be filled until the next presidential inauguration following the elections. Four such vacancies occurred: four Vice Presidents succeeded to the presidency. The Colombian Constitution, ratified in 1991, allows for the election of a vice president following the election by both houses of Congress. Since its ratification, the vice presidency has been vacant twice (most recently during the Presidency of Juan Manuel Santos) and was filled on both occasions through this process. The amendment also established a procedure by which a vice president can, if the president is unable to exercise the powers and duties of the office, temporarily assume those powers and duties as acting president. Only one vice president has briefly served as president under the Constitution: Carlos Lemos Simmonds in 1998.

== List ==
=== Gran Colombia (1819–1831) ===
No.	Portrait	Name (Birth–Death)	Term	Party	Election	President
1		Francisco Antonio Zea	17 December 1819 – 21 March 1820	Military		Simón Bolívar
2		Juan Germán Roscio	21 March 1820 – 4 April 1821	Military		Simón Bolívar
3		Antonio Nariño	4 April 1821 – 6 June 1821	Military		Simón Bolívar
4		José María del Castillo	6 June 1821 – 3 October 1821	Military		Simón Bolívar
5		Francisco de Paula Santander	3 October 1821 – 19 September 1827	Military		Simón Bolívar
	Office vacant (19 September 1827 – 3 May 1830)			Military		Simón Bolívar
6		Domingo Caycedo	3 May 1830 – 21 November 1831	Military		Joaquín Mosquera
	Office vacant (19 September 1827 – 3 May 1830)			Military		Rafael Urdaneta
7		Domingo Caycedo	14 April 1831 – 20 October 1831	Military		Vacant

=== New Granada (1831–1858) ===
No.	Portrait	Name (Birth–Death)	Term	Party	Election	President
1		José María Obando	21 November 1831 – 10 March 1832	Liberal		Domingo Caycedo y Sanz de Santamaría
2		José Ignacio de Márquez	10 March 1832 – 12 May 1833	Conservative		Francisco de Paula Santander
3		Joaquín Mosquera	12 May 1833 – 1 April 1835	Conservative		Santander y Omaña
4		José Ignacio de Márquez	1 April 1835 – 1 April 1837	Conservative		Francisco de Paula Santander
5		Domingo Caycedo	1 April 1837 – 1 April 1843			José Ignacio de Márquez
6		Joaquín Gori	1 April 1843 – 1 April 1845	Conservative		Pedro Herrán
7		Rufino Cuervo	1 April 1845 – 1 April 1851	Conservative		Tomás Cipriano de Mosquera
8		José de Obaldía	1 April 1851 – 1 April 1855	Liberal		José Hilario López
9		Manuel María Mallarino Ibargüen	1 April 1855 – 1 April 1857	Conservative		José de Obaldía
	Office abolished (1 April 1857 – 4 August 1886)					Mariano Ospina Rodríguez

=== Colombia (1886–present) ===
No.	Portrait	Name (Birth–Death)	Term	Party	Election	President
1		Eliseo Payán (1825–1895)	13 December 1887 – 8 February 1888	Conservative	1887	Rafael Núñez
	Office vacant (8 February 1888 – 7 August 1892)					Rafael Núñez
2		Miguel Antonio Caro (1845–1909)	7 August 1892 – 18 September 1894	Conservative	1890	Rafael Núñez
	Office vacant (18 September 1894 – 7 August 1898)					Miguel Antonio Caro
3		José Manuel Marroquín (1827–1908)	7 August 1898 – 31 July 1900	Conservative	1890	Manuel Antonio Sanclemente
	Office vacant (31 July 1900 – 7 August 1904)					José Manuel Marroquín
4		Ramón González Valencia (1851–1928)	7 August 1904 – 10 March 1905	Conservative	1894	Rafael Reyes
	Office abolished (10 March 1905 – 7 August 1994)					Rafael Reyes
5		Humberto de la Calle (b.1946)	7 August 1994 – 10 September 1996	Liberal	1994	Ernesto Samper
	Office vacant (10 – 19 September 1996)					Ernesto Samper
6		Carlos Lemos Simmonds (1933–2003)	19 September 1996 – 7 August 1998	Liberal		Ernesto Samper
7		Gustavo Bell (b. 1957)	7 August 1998 – 7 August 2002	Conservative	1998	Andrés Pastrana
8		Francisco Santos Calderón (b. 1961)	7 August 2002 – 7 August 2010 (Note: Francisco Santos Calderón was the first vice president to have been legally allowed to seek an immediate second term by the 2nd Legislative Act of 2004 that amended Article 197 of the 1991 Constitution. Before that, the 1886 Constitution allowed vice presidents to seek a second term only in non-consecutive periods.)	Colombia First	2002	Álvaro Uribe
8		Francisco Santos Calderón (b. 1961)	7 August 2002 – 7 August 2010	Colombia First	2006	Álvaro Uribe
9		Angelino Garzón (b. 1946)	7 August 2010 – 7 August 2014	Unionist	2010	Juan Manuel Santos
10		Germán Vargas Lleras (1962–2026)	7 August 2014 – 21 March 2017	Radical Change	2014	Juan Manuel Santos
	Office vacant (21 – 29 March 2017)					Juan Manuel Santos
11		Óscar Naranjo (b. 1956)	29 March 2017 – 7 August 2018	Unionist	2017	Juan Manuel Santos
12		Marta Lucía Ramírez (b. 1954)	7 August 2018 – 7 August 2022	Democratic Center	2018	Iván Duque
13		Francia Márquez (b. 1981)	7 August 2022 – 7 August 2026	Democratic Pole (Historic Pact)	2022	Gustavo Petro
14		José Manuel Restrepo (b. 1970)	7 August 2026 - Incumbent	Defenders of the Homeland	2026	Abelardo de la Espriella

== See also ==
- List of viceroys of New Granada
- List of presidential designates of Colombia
- List of presidents of Colombia
