= 1886 Colombian presidential election =

Indirect presidential elections were held in Colombia in 1886. Rafael Núñez was elected unanimously.

== Background ==
Following the promulgation of the 1886 constitution, the Council of Delegates selected a president and vice president to serve a six-year term until elections in 1892. The Council also elected the Designado, a designated replacement for the president.

== Results ==
=== President ===
Candidate	Votes	%
Rafael Núñez	18	100.00
Total	18	100.00
Source: Historia electoral colombiana

=== Vice President ===
Candidate	Votes	%
Eliseo Payán	18	100.00
Total	18	100.00
Source: Historia electoral colombiana

=== Designado ===
Candidate	Votes	%
José María Campo Serrano	17	94.44
Antonio Roldán Betancourt	1	5.56
Total	18	100.00
Source: Historia electoral colombiana
