= 1910 Colombian presidential election =

Indirect presidential elections were held in Colombia on 15 June 1910. The result was a victory for Carlos Eugenio Restrepo of the Republican Union.

== Background ==
Rafael Reyes was elected president for a six-year term in 1904, but resigned and went into exile in June 1909 under pressure from opposition parties. Ramón González Valencia was elected interim President to see out Reyes' term, and convened a Constituent Assembly to meet in 1910.

The Assembly passed several reforms to the constitution, reducing the presidential term from six to four years, banning immediate re-election, scrapping the post of Vice President and reintroducing direct elections from 1914. The Assembly also elected a President to serve the first term from 1910 until 1914.

== Results ==
Candidate	Party	Votes	%
Carlos Eugenio Restrepo	Republican Union	23	53.49
José Vicente Concha	Colombian Conservative Party	18	41.86
Guillermo Quintero Calderón	Colombian Conservative Party	2	4.65
Total		43	100.00
Source: Ríos Penalosa
