= 1856 Colombian presidential election =

- 1856
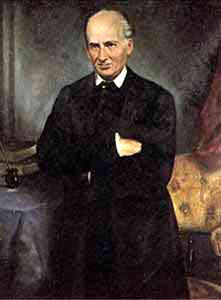

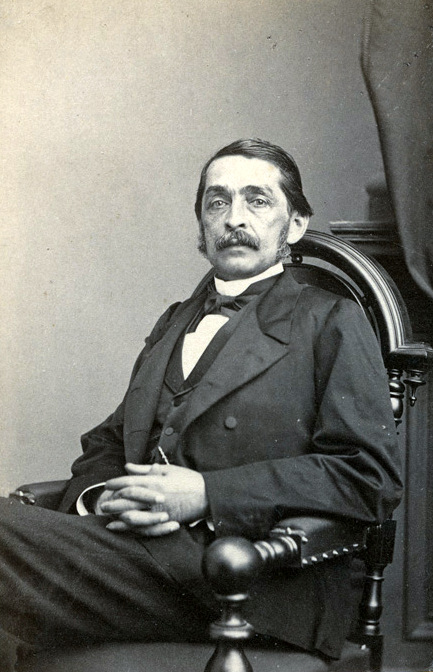

Candidate	Mariano Ospina Rodríguez	Manuel Murillo Toro	Tomás Cipriano de Mosquera
Party	Conservative	Liberal	National
Popular vote	96,651	79,411	32,713
Percentage	46.26%	38.01%	15.65%
President before election
José Hilario López
Liberal
Elected President
José María Obando
Liberal

Presidential elections were held in the Republic of New Granada in 1856. Following constitutional reforms in 1853, they were the first direct presidential elections in the country. The elections were free and fair.

Following the elections, Congress convened on 4 February 1857 to verify the results. The result was a victory for Mariano Ospina Rodríguez of the Conservative Party.

== Results ==
Candidate	Party	Votes	%
Mariano Ospina Rodríguez	Colombian Conservative Party	96,651	46.26
Manuel Murillo Toro	Colombian Liberal Party	79,411	38.01
Tomás Cipriano de Mosquera	National Party	32,713	15.66
Mariano Ospina		83	0.04
Patrocinio Cuéllar		6	0.00
Manuel A. Murillo de Torres		6	0.00
Vicente Cárdena		4	0.00
Juan A. Arias		3	0.00
Casto Celedón		3	0.00
José María Obando		3	0.00
Ezequiel Rojas		3	0.00
Florentino González		2	0.00
Francisco F. Martínez		2	0.00
Pedro Alcántara Herrán		1	0.00
Julio Arboleda Pombo		1	0.00
Benedicto Arias		1	0.00
Juan Demetrio Arizabaleta		1	0.00
Justo Arosemena Quesada		1	0.00
J. Antonio de la Barrera		1	0.00
Martín Barros		1	0.00
Simón Belacázar		1	0.00
Gabriel Bermúdez Santos		1	0.00
Manuel José Bonilla		1	0.00
Miguel Burbano		1	0.00
Juan Campos		1	0.00
Celedonio Castillo		1	0.00
Luis Celadón Fernández		1	0.00
Manuel Ezequiel Corrales		1	0.00
Rufino Díaz		1	0.00
José María Franco		1	0.00
Luis María Galindo		1	0.00
Reyes Gamboa		1	0.00
Rafael María Giraldo		1	0.00
Narciso Gómez		1	0.00
Ramón Gómez		1	0.00
Manuel Góngora		1	0.00
J. María Jovane Arce		1	0.00
Manuel S. Jurado		1	0.00
Juan Lara		1	0.00
José María Llanos		1	0.00
Mariano Montaña		1	0.00
Joaquín Mosquera		1	0.00
Manuel Muriilo		1	0.00
Manuel Murillo Tero		1	0.00
Manuel U. Orna		1	0.00
Juan de D. Ortiz		1	0.00
Juan Oscorio Aldana		1	0.00
Mariano Ospina Rodríguez		1	0.00
Pastor Ospina		1	0.00
Emigdio Palau		1	0.00
Francisco A. Palau		1	0.00
Joaquín Paris		1	0.00
Manuel Piedrahíta		1	0.00
Antonio Pinto		1	0.00
Saturnino Rincón		1	0.00
Manual Ma. Rodríguez Y.		1	0.00
Alejandro Rubiano de Rivariv		1	0.00
Rafael Salcedo		1	0.00
Antonio Sánchez		1	0.00
Leando Sánchez		1	0.00
Proto Sandoval		1	0.00
José Manuel Suárez		1	0.00
Dionisio E. Vélez		1	0.00
Marcos Veloza		1	0.00
Total		208,941	100.00
Valid votes		208,941	99.95
Invalid votes		26	0.01
Blank votes		71	0.03
Total votes		209,038	100.00
Source: Historia electoral colombiana
