= José María Rojas Garrido =

Colombian politician (1824–1883)

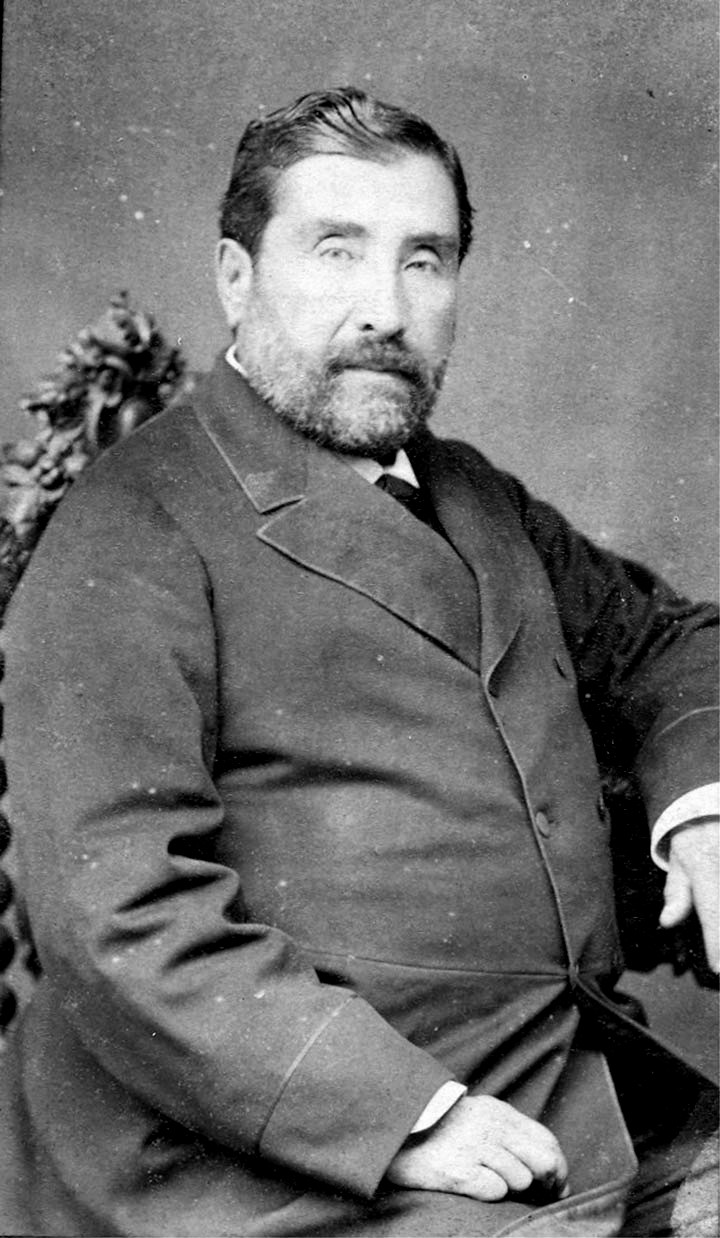
- Portrait, 1866

3rd President of the United States of Colombia
- In office April 1, 1866 – May 22, 1866
- Preceded by: Manuel Murillo Toro
- Succeeded by: Tomás Cipriano de Mosquera

Magistrate of the Supreme Court
- In office 1870–1883
- In office 1865–1866

Secretary of Foreign Affairs
- In office September 1, 1866 – May 22, 1867
- President: Tomás Cipriano de Mosquera
- Preceded by: Manuel Morro
- Succeeded by: Carlos Martín
- In office May 23, 1866 – July 2, 1866
- President: Tomás Cipriano de Mosquera
- Preceded by: Cerbeleon Pinzón
- Succeeded by: Manuel Morro
- In office December 1, 1862 – February 3, 1863
- President: Tomás Cipriano de Mosquera
- Preceded by: Manuel Ancízar
- Succeeded by: José Hilario López
- In office July 18, 1861 – November 22, 1861
- President: Tomás Cipriano de Mosquera
- Preceded by: Manuel María Mallarino
- Succeeded by: Manuel Ancízar

Personal details
- Born: Agrado, Cundinamarca, Colombia
- Died: July 18, 1883 (aged 59) Bogotá, Cundinamarca, United States of Colombia
- Party: Liberal
- Spouse: Luisa de Francisco y Ponce
- Education: Colegio de San Bartolomé
- Occupation: Lawyer, Judge, Journalist

José María Rojas Garrido (June 7, 1824 – July 18, 1883) was a Colombian Senator, and statesman, who as the first Presidential Designate became Acting President of the United States of Colombia (now the Republic of Colombia) in 1866 during the absence of President elect Tomás Cipriano de Mosquera. He was a prominent journalist for several Liberal Party newspapers, and is considered one of the most important orators in Colombia's history.

== Political career ==
José María Rojas Garrido had a wide and extensive political career, serving at the Local, Departmental and National levels, and in the Legislative, Executive and Judicial branches of the National Government.

=== Early political career ===
Rojas Garrido received his doctorate in jurisprudence in 1847 from the Colegio de San Bartolomé. In 1851 he was appointed Governor of the Province on Neiva by his close friend President José Hilario López. In 1856 he was elected to the Chamber of Representatives for the State of Antioquia, and shortly after was appointed Chargé d'affaires in Venezuela by President José María Obando. Rojas Garrido had a very close relationship with General Mosquera, they were close friends, and Rojas Garrido was appointed four times to the Ministry of Foreign Affairs four times, during the various administrations of Mosquera. In 1861 he served as Governor of the Province of Bogotá, and in 1862 served as Deputy in the Antioquia State Assembly, and from 1862 to 1863 he regained the office of Secretary of Foreign Affairs, having this time also control of the Ministry of War and Navy. In 1864 he returned to Venezuela this time as Minister Plenipotentiary and Special Commissioner. When he returned return to New Granada he was elected by Congress to the Supreme Court of Colombia.

=== Presidency 1865 ===
In 1866, former President General Tomás Cipriano de Mosquera was elected once again to the Presidency. On February 17, 1866, Congress held elections for the Presidential Delegates for that calendar year and elected José María Rojas Garrido First Presidential Designate, and Santos Acosta, and Marcelino Gutierrez as the Second and Third Presidential Designates. The Presidential Delegates were those who because of the abolishment of the office of Vice President were in line to succeed the President in his absence. The title did not carry an official office, but because General Mosquera was in Europe at the time, Rojas Garrido assumed the office of the Presidency on April 1, 1866, acting in the absence of the President Elect as the 3rd President of the United States of Colombia, until May 22, 1866 when General Mosquera returned to the country and was sworn in.

=== Post presidency ===
After ceding power, José María Rojas Garrido remained an active advisor to the President being appointed one last time as Secretary of Foreign Affairs. He was later re-elected as Magistrate to the Supreme Court in 1870, and in 1872, Rojas Garrido ran an unsuccessful bid for the Presidency, losing the election to Manuel Murillo Toro. José María Rojas Garrido remained in the Supreme Court until his death on July 18, 1883, in Bogotá because of a pulmonary congestion.

== See also ==
- Julián Trujillo Largacha
- Bartolomé Calvo
