= José de Obaldía =

Colombian lawyer and politician

José de Obaldía y Orejuela
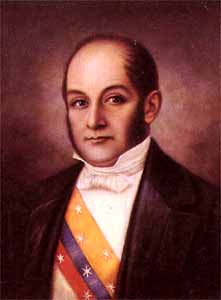

7th Vice President of New Granada
- In office 1 April 1851 – 1 April 1855
- President: José Hilario López Valdéz (1851—1853); José María Obando del Campo (1853—1854); None (1854—1855)
- Preceded by: Rufino Cuervo y Barreto
- Succeeded by: Manuel María Mallarino Ibargüen

Personal details
- Born: 19 July 1806 Santiago, Panama, Viceroyalty of the New Granada
- Died: 28 December 1889 (aged 83) David, Panama, Colombia
- Party: Liberal
- Spouse: Ana María Gallegos Candanedo (1842—1889)
- Children: José Arístides de Obaldía Gallegos; José Domingo de Obaldía Gallegos; José Lorenzo de Obaldía Gallegos; Ana Josefa de Obaldía Gallegos
- Education: National University of Colombia
- Profession: Lawyer

José Arsenio Vicente del Carmen de Obaldía y Orejuela (19 July 1806 – 28 December 1889) was the 7th Vice President of New Granada, and as such served as Acting President in two occasions. Obaldia is the only Colombian president born in what is now Panama, which separated from Colombia in 1903.

== Personal life ==
José Arsenio Vicente del Carmen was born on 19 July 1806 in Santiago de Veraguas, then part of the Viceroyalty of the New Granada, to Domingo Blas de Obaldía y Latatu, a Spaniard native of Álava, and Juana María de Orejuela Cordero, a Criollo of Spanish descent. In 1842 he married Ana María Gallegos Candanedo with whom he had four children: José Arístides, José Domingo, José Lorenzo, and Ana Josefa, the last two dying before reaching puberty.

== Vice Presidency (1851—1855) ==
Obaldía was elected in 1851 to succeed Rufino Cuervo y Barreto as the 7th Vice President of New Granada; he took office on 1 April 1851 as President José Hilario López Valdéz's 2nd vice president. From 14 October 1851 to 21 January 1852 Vice President Obaldía became acting president in charge of the Executive Power while President López was out of the capital until his return. On 1 April 1853 José María Obando del Campo succeeded López to the presidency, Obaldía remained as vice president as the elections for president and vice president were held two years apart.

Although Obando and Obaldía both belonged to the newly created Liberal party, they belonged to different ideological camps; Obando was of the Draconian faction (pragmatist but defenders of the death penalty), and Obaldía was of the Golgothian faction (radical liberal reformers). This brought them into conflict from the start as the Golgothians had opposed Obando's nomination in the first place.

In April 1854, Golgothians in congress moved to reduce the size and influence of the armed forces, thus provoking a coup by General José María Melo y Ortiz, commander of the Bogotá garrison. General Melo hoped that Obando would welcome the uprising and move to suspend Congress, but when President Obando refused, Melo assumed the presidency himself establishing a dictatorship and imprisoning Obando. Vice President Obaldía managed to escape by taking refuge in the US Legation in Bogotá headed by James S. Green, the United States Chargé d'Affaires to New Granada.

Obaldía and the rest of the Melo opposition reconvened in Ibagué where they headed the government-in-exile and launched the military campaign to remove Melo from power. On 22 September, Congress convened in Ibagué, impeached President Obando for irresponsible negligence in not preventing the coup and formally removed him from office. On 5 August Vice President Obaldía, who had testified against Obando in his trial before Congress, was left in charge of the Executive Power as acting president of the government, leading the resistance against the dictatorship of Melo. On 4 December the constitutional forces marched into Bogotá, deposed Melo and left Vice President Obaldía as acting president of the constitutional government now in power.

On 1 April 1855 Obaldía's term came to an end and Congress elected Conservative Congressman Manuel María Mallarino Ibargüen to succeed Obaldía as vice president and to finish Obando's term as acting president. The next President, Mariano Ospina Rodríguez, was elected in 1857 and was also a Conservative.
