= 1897–98 Colombian presidential election =

Presidential elections were held in Colombia in two stages in 1897 and 1898. On 5 December 1897 members of the electoral colleges were elected. They met on 1 February 1898 to elect the president. The result was a victory for Manuel Antonio Sanclemente of the National Party.

== Electoral system ==
The 1886 constitution changed the presidential electoral system from one where a candidate had to win a majority of states to be elected (or be elected by Congress if no candidate won a majority of states), to a two-stage system. Voters meeting literacy and property requirements (which were not required for local and regional elections) elected members of an electoral college, who in turn elected the president.

== Results ==
=== President ===
Candidate	Party	Votes	%
Manuel Antonio Sanclemente	National Party	1,606	78.53
Miguel Samper Agudelo	Colombian Liberal Party	318	15.55
Rafael Reyes	Colombian Conservative Party	121	5.92
Total		2,045	100.00
Source: Political Database of the Americas

=== Vice President ===
Candidate	Party	Votes	%
José Manuel Marroquín	National Party	1,693	83.94
Foción Soto	Colombian Liberal Party	324	16.06
Total		2,017	100.00
Source: The Library, UC San Diego
