= Manuel María Ramírez Fortoul =

Colombian lawyer and politician

Manuel María Ramírez
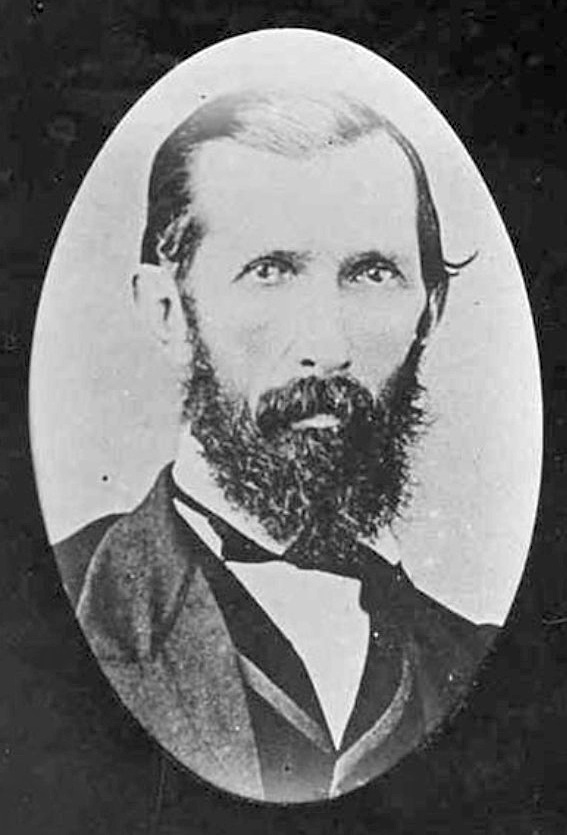

Presidente de la República de Colombia
- In office December 22, 1877 – December 24, 1877
- Preceded by: Aquileo Parra
- Succeeded by: Aquileo Parra

Personal details
- Born: 5 May 1817 Arauca, Viceroyalty of New Granada
- Died: 3 May 1891 (73 years old) Bogotá, Colombia
- Party: Partido Liberal
- Spouse: Teresa Monreal Roth
- Children: 2
- Education: Colegio de San Bartolomé
- Profession: Abogado

Manuel María Ramírez Fortoul (Arauca, 5 May 1817 - Bogotá, 3 May 1891) was a Colombian lawyer and politician, who was President of Colombia from 22 December 1877 to 24 December 1877 as designate, while President Aquileo Parra Gómez was away.

== Life ==
He was the son of lieutenant colonel Antonio María Ramírez and Dolores Fortoul Jaimes, cousin of Pierre Fortoul, a Frenchman who was the first in his family to emigrate to Colombia. Manuel Ramirez Fortoul went to primary school in Bogotá and Cúcuta, and then to a regional secondary school in Guanentá and afterwards studied law at the Universidad de Bartolomé.

=== Political career ===
During the time of the Republic of New Granada, he was a member of the Constitutional Convention of the Santander Department (1851) and the National Parliament (1852 - 1853). At that time he was the director of customs in Cúcuta: he went to Venezuela when he left that post. He was the attorney general of Colombia between 1 August 1877 and 15 June 1878, and while in this position, he advised the nation's leaders amidst the civil war. While President Aquileo Parra was absent putting down the uprising, Ramírez briefly became acting head of government.

== Later life ==
He returned to his work as the director of the customs house in Cúcuta and in 1885 he was appointed to be the Colombian consul in Trujillo. In 1890 he returned to Bogotá where he practiced his profession briefly before his death in 1891.

== Family ==
He married Teresa Monreal Roth in Trujillo on 19 February 1844. They had two children: Felipe and Carlos Ramírez Monreal.
