= 1957 Colombian constitutional reform referendum =

1 December 1957

Results
Choice	Votes	%
Yes	4,169,294	95.27%
No	206,864	4.73%
Valid votes	4,376,158	99.52%
Invalid or blank votes	20,932	0.48%
Total votes	4,397,090	100.00%
Registered voters/turnout		72.30%

A referendum on the reform programme of the military junta was held in Colombia on 1 December 1957. Women were given the vote for the first time, and the programme was approved by 95% of voters.

== Background ==
After a coup d'état on 10 May 1957, the ruling military junta issued decree 0247, calling for a referendum on constitutional reforms and the election of a Constitutional Council on 16 March 1958, as well as allowing the Liberal Party and Conservative Party to form a provisional government.

== Results ==
Choice	Votes	%
For	4,169,294	95.27
Against	206,864	4.73
Invalid/blank votes	20,932	–
Total	4,397,090	100
Registered voters/turnout		72.30
Source: Direct Democracy
