= Manuel María Mallarino =

8th Vice President of the Republic of New Grenada

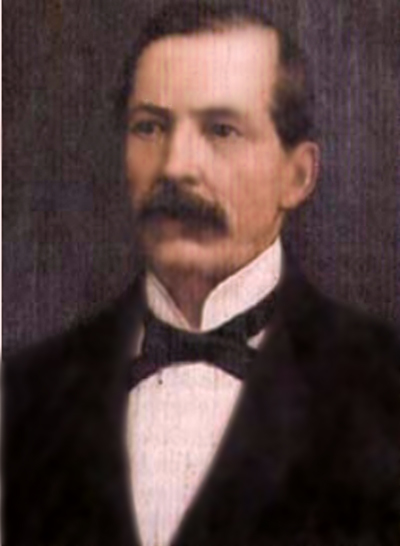
- 1855 painting by Ramón Torres Méndez

Secretary of Foreign Affairs of the Granadine Confederation
- In office 1 April 1861 – 10 July 1861
- President: Bartolomé Calvo Díaz
- Preceded by: Juan Antonio Pardo Pardo
- Succeeded by: José María Rojas Garrido

President of the New Granada
- In office 1 April 1855 – 1 April 1857
- Vice President: None
- Preceded by: José de Obaldía
- Succeeded by: Mariano Ospina

Vice President of New Granada
- In office 5 August 1854 – 1 April 1859
- President: None (1855-1857)
- Preceded by: José de Obaldía
- Succeeded by: Position abolished

Secretary of Foreign Affairs of New Granada
- In office 7 February 1848 – 19 June 1848
- President: Tomás Cipriano de Mosquera y Arboleda
- Preceded by: Manuel Esteban Ancízar Basterra
- Succeeded by: José María Galaviz
- In office 13 October 1846 – 20 July 1847
- President: Tomás Cipriano de Mosquera y Arboleda
- Preceded by: Juan Antonio Pardo Pardo
- Succeeded by: Manuel Esteban Ancízar Basterra
- In office 28 May 1846 – 7 July 1846
- President: Tomás Cipriano de Mosquera y Arboleda
- Preceded by: Eusebio Borrero y Costa
- Succeeded by: Juan Antonio Pardo Pardo

Personal details
- Born: 18 June 1808 Santiago de Cali, Popayán, Viceroyalty of the New Granada
- Died: 6 January 1872 (aged 63) Bogotá, Cundinamarca, U.S Colombia
- Party: Conservative
- Spouse(s): María Mercedes Cabal (1836–1872)
- Children: José María Mallarino Cabal; Victor Mallarino Cabal; Antonio Mallarino Cabal; Susana Mallarino Cabal; Gonzalo Mallarino Cabal; Sofía Mallarino Cabal; Julio Daniel Mallarino Cabal
- Education: University of Cauca (JD, 1831)
- Profession: Lawyer

Manuel María Mallarino Ibargüen (18 June 1808 – 6 January 1872) was the 8th Vice President of New Granada, and as such served as Acting President from 1855 to 1857.

== Personal life ==
Manuel María was born on 18 June 1808 in Santiago de Cali, then part of the Viceroyalty of New Granada, the oldest child of José María Mallarino y Vargas, a Spaniard natural of Cádiz of Italian descent, and Juana María de la Concepción Ibargüen (née Scarpetta Roo y Bedoya), a Criolla natural of Cali also of Italian descent. His two younger siblings were María Josefa and Francisco Antonio. He attended the University of Cauca graduating Juris Doctor on 17 July 1831. On 11 August 1836 he married María Mercedes Cabal, daughter of José Antonio Víctor Cabal Molina and María Petrona Borrero y Costa, and natural of Buga, in his father-in-law's hacienda in El Cerrito. Manuel María and María Mercedes had seven children: José María, Victor, Antonio, Susana, Gonzalo, Sofía, and Julio Daniel.

His nephews Carlos and Jorge Holguín Mallarino, sons of his sister María Josefa, became prominent Conservative party politicians who like him served in Congress and as Acting Presidents; Jorge went on to serve as the 10th President of Colombia.

== Secretary of Foreign Affairs (1846–1848) ==
Mallarino served as the 21st, 23rd, and 25th Secretary of Foreign Affairs of New Granada during the Administration of President Tomás Cipriano de Mosquera y Arboleda. In 1846, Chancellor Mallarino was commissioned to negotiate and sign with the United States Chargé d'Affaires in New Granada, Benjamin Alden Bidlack, the Mallarino–Bidlack Treaty, an agreement of mutual cooperation between the United States and New Granada that granted the US significant transit rights over the Isthmus of Panama, as well as military powers to suppress social conflicts and independence struggles targeted against New Granada. However this treaty would later be recalled by the US to justify American involvement in the Separation of Panama from Colombia.

== Vice Presidency (1855–1859) ==
On 17 April 1854 General José María Melo y Ortiz deposed President José María Obando del Campo in a coup d'état. Later that year General Melo agreed to step down and handed power back to the previous administration; President Obando had been formally impeached by Congress so the Executive Power lay in the hands of Vice President José de Obaldía y Orejuela as Acting President as the New Granadian Constitution of 1832 did not allow for a full succession of power. The Constitution also prescribed for separate elections for President and Vice President set two years apart, so in 1855 when Vice President Obaldía's term came to an end Congress set out to elect his successor and elected Mallarino to succeed Obaldía. Mallarino took office as the 8th Vice President of New Granada on 1 April 1855 becoming Acting President of New Granada. In 1857 Mallarino handed Executive Power to the newly elected President, Mariano Ospina Rodríguez, who took office on 1 April; he then served out the remaining of his term as Ospina's Vice President until 1 April 1857. President Ospina set out to rewrite the Constitution, eliminating the Office of the Vice President among other substantial changes. Mallarino was thus the last Vice President of New Granada as he had no successor. The country would not have another Vice President until 1886 when the Colombian Constitution of 1886 reopened the Vice Presidency.

== Secretary of Foreign Affairs (1861) ==
In 1861 Mallarino was tapped again to serve as Secretary of Foreign Affairs, this time appointed by President Bartolomé Calvo Díaz during the Civil War of 1860–1862. For this reason when Mallarino took office on 1 April 1861 as the 2nd Secretary of Foreign Affairs of the Granadine Confederation he only served until 10 July, when General Mosquera, under whose Administration he had served as Secretary of Foreign Affairs in the past, deposed President Calvo and toppled the Government.
