= 1869–70 Colombian presidential election =

← 1867–68	1869–70	1871–72 →

Presidential elections were held in the United States of Colombia in 1869 and 1870. The electors were elected in 1869 and elected the president the following year. The result was a victory for Eustorgio Salgar of the Liberal Party.

== Electoral system ==
The 1863 constitution changed the electoral system from a direct vote to an indirect vote. The President was now elected on the basis of which candidate received the most votes in each state, with a candidate required to win in at least five of the nine states to be elected. If no candidate received a majority, Congress would elect the President from the main contenders.

== Results ==
Candidate	Party	States won
Eustorgio Salgar	Liberal Party	6
Tomás Cipriano de Mosquera	Liberal Party	2
Pedro Alcántara Herrán	Conservative Party	1
Total		9
Source: PDBA
