= 1864 Colombian presidential election =

← 1863	1864	1865–66 →

Presidential elections were held in the United States of Colombia in 1864. The Liberal Party was the only party to nominate candidates, and the result was a victory for Manuel Murillo Toro.

== Electoral system ==
The 1863 constitution changed the electoral system from a direct vote to an indirect vote. The President was now elected on the basis of which candidate received the most votes in each state, with a candidate required to win in at least five of the nine states to be elected. If no candidate received a majority, Congress would elect the President from the main contenders.

== Results ==
The electors were elected in 1863.

Candidate	Party	States won
Manuel Murillo Toro	Liberal Party	6
Santos Gutiérrez	Liberal Party	2
Tomás Cipriano de Mosquera	Liberal Party	1
Total		9
Source: PDBA
