= 1909 Colombian presidential election =

Indirect presidential elections were held in Colombia on 3 August 1909. The result was a victory for Ramón González Valencia.

== Background ==
President Rafael Reyes went into exile on 13 June 1909. Jorge Holguín served as temporary president until a new Congress was elected in June was able to elect an interim president to serve out the remainder of Reyes' term, which ended on 7 August 1910.

== Results ==
Candidate	Votes	%
Ramón González Valencia	47	59.49
Marco Fidel Suárez	31	39.24
Guillermo Quintero Calderón	1	1.27
Total	79	100.00
Source: Historia electoral colombiana
