= 1865–66 Colombian presidential election =

← 1864	1866	1867–68 →

Presidential elections were held in the United States of Colombia in 1865 and February 1866. The electors were elected in 1865 and elected the president the following year. The result was a victory for Tomás Cipriano de Mosquera of the Liberal Party.

== Electoral system ==
The 1863 constitution changed the electoral system from a direct vote to an indirect vote. The President was now elected on the basis of which candidate received the most votes in each state, with a candidate required to win in at least five of the nine states to be elected. If no candidate received a majority, Congress would elect the President from the main contenders.

== Results ==
Candidate	Party	States won
Tomás Cipriano de Mosquera	Liberal Party	7
José Hilario López	Liberal Party	1
Pedro Justo Berrío	Conservative Party	1
Total		9
Source: PDBA
