= 1880 Colombian presidential election =

Presidential elections were held in the United States of Colombia in 1880. The result was a victory for Rafael Núñez of the Liberal Party.

== Electoral system ==
The 1863 constitution changed the electoral system from a direct vote to an indirect vote. The President was now elected on the basis of which candidate received the most votes in each state, with a candidate required to win in at least five of the nine states to be elected. If no candidate received a majority, Congress would elect the President from the main contenders. Following the tensions around the 1875 elections of the electoral college, constitutional reforms in 1876 ended the staggered nature of the college elections, requiring that all electors were elected on the same day across the country.

== Results ==
Candidate	Party	States won
Rafael Núñez	Liberal Party	7
Tomás Rengifo	Liberal Party	2
Total		9
Source: PDBA
