= 1891–92 Colombian presidential election =

- December 1891 (first stage); 2 February 1892 (second stage)
- Presidential election
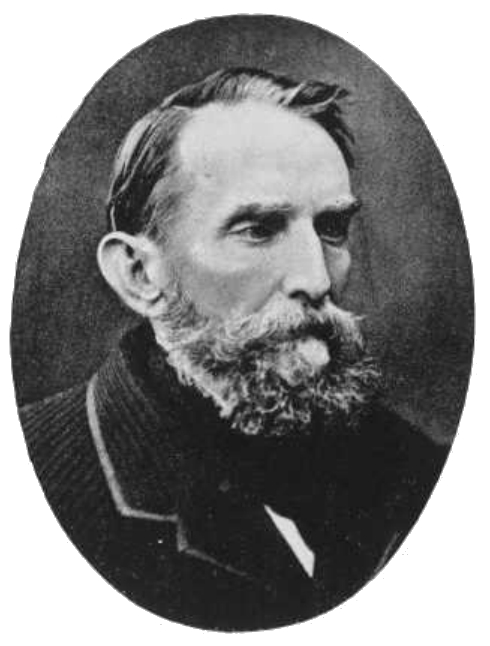

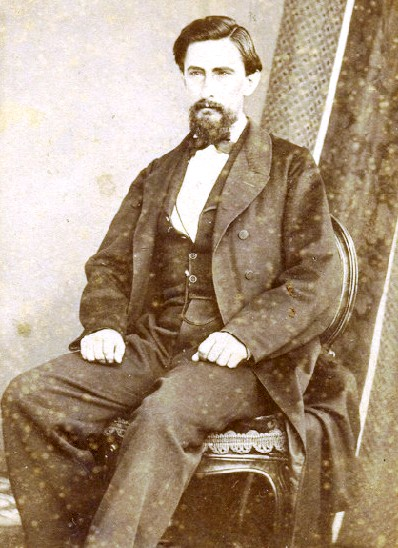
Nominee	Rafael Núñez	Marcelino Vélez
Party	National	Conservative
Electoral vote	2,075	509
Percentage	80.30%	19.70%
President before election
Carlos Holguín Mallarino
Conservative
Elected President
Rafael Núñez
National

Presidential elections were held in Colombia in two stages in 1891 and 1892. Members of the electoral colleges were elected in December 1891. They met on 2 February 1892 to elect the president. The result was a victory for Rafael Núñez of the National Party.

== Electoral system ==
The 1886 constitution changed the presidential electoral system from one where a candidate had to win a majority of states to be elected (or be elected by Congress if no candidate won a majority of states), to a two-stage system. Voters meeting literacy and property requirements (which were not required for local and regional elections) elected members of an electoral college, who in turn elected the president.

== Results ==
=== President ===
Candidate	Party	Votes	%
Rafael Núñez	National Party	2,075	80.30
Marceliano Vélez	Colombian Conservative Party	509	19.70
Total		2,584	100.00
Source: PDBA

=== Vice President ===
Candidate	Party	Votes	%
Miguel Antonio Caro	National Party	2,082	80.54
José Joaquín Ortiz	Colombian Conservative Party	503	19.46
Total		2,585	100.00
Source: The Library
