= 1873–74 Colombian presidential election =

Presidential elections were held in the United States of Colombia in 1873 and 1874. The electors were elected in 1873 and elected the president the following year. The result was a victory for Santiago Pérez de Manosalbas of the Liberal Party.

== Electoral system ==
The 1863 constitution changed the electoral system from a direct vote to an indirect vote. The President was now elected on the basis of which candidate received the most votes in each state, with a candidate required to win in at least five of the nine states to be elected. If no candidate received a majority, Congress would elect the President from the main contenders.

== Results ==
Candidate	Party	States won
Santiago Pérez de Manosalbas	Liberal Party	6
Julián Trujillo Largacha	Liberal Party	3
Total		9
Source: PDBA
