= 1867–68 Colombian presidential election =

← 1865–66	1868	1869–70 →

Presidential elections were held in the United States of Colombia in 1867 and 1868. The electors were elected in 1867 and elected the president the following year. The result was a victory for Santos Gutiérrez of the Liberal Party.

== Electoral system ==
The 1863 constitution changed the electoral system from a direct vote to an indirect vote. The President was now elected on the basis of which candidate received the most votes in each state, with a candidate required to win in at least five of the nine states to be elected. If no candidate received a majority, Congress would elect the President from the main contenders.

== Results ==
Candidate	Party	States won
Santos Gutiérrez	Liberal Party	5
Pedro Justo Berrío	Conservative Party	2
Eustorgio Salgar	Liberal Party	1
Total		9
Source: PDBA
