= 1860 Colombian presidential election =

- 1860

Presidential elections were held in the Granadine Confederation in 1860, the first under the 1858 constitution. The elections were held during the 1860–62 civil war, but not in the parts of the country controlled by the Liberal Party, and the Liberal Party did not put forward a candidate in the remainder of the country. As a result, the election was a contest between two Conservative Party candidates, Pedro Alcántara Herrán and Julio Arboleda Pombo, with Julio Arboleda Pombo emerging as the winner with 73% of votes.

== Results ==
Candidate	Party	Votes	%
Julio Arboleda Pombo	Colombian Conservative Party	58,506	73.23
Pedro Alcántara Herrán	Colombian Conservative Party	21,390	26.77
Total		79,896	100.00
Source: Political Database of the Americas
