= 1904 Colombian presidential election =

Presidential elections were held in Colombia in 1904. The result was a victory for Rafael Reyes of the Conservative Party.

== Electoral system ==
The 1886 constitution changed the presidential electoral system from one where a candidate had to win a majority of states to be elected (or be elected by Congress if no candidate won a majority of states), to a two-stage system. Voters meeting literacy and property requirements (which were not required for local and regional elections) elected members of an electoral college, who in turn elected the President.

== Results ==
=== President ===
Candidate	Party	Votes	%
Rafael Reyes	Colombian Conservative Party	994	43.94
Marceliano Vélez	Colombian Conservative Party	982	43.41
Aristides Fernandez		145	6.41
Miguel Antonio Caro		70	3.09
Pedro Nel Ospina Vázquez		40	1.77
Rafael Uribe Uribe		11	0.49
Guillermo Quintero Calderón		7	0.31
Luis Rico		5	0.22
Pedro A. Molina		3	0.13
Ramón González Valencia		2	0.09
Sergio Camargo		1	0.04
Juan Cadavid		1	0.04
José A. Pinto		1	0.04
Total		2,262	100.00
Valid votes		2,262	99.69
Invalid/blank votes		7	0.31
Total votes		2,269	100.00
Source: Historia Electoral Colombian
