= National Party (Colombia) =

Defunct political party in Colombia

National Party Partido Nacional
- Leader: Miguel Antonio Caro
- Founder: Rafael Núñez
- Founded: 1886
- Dissolved: 1902
- Split from: Liberal Party
- Merged into: Conservative Party
- Headquarters: Bogotá
- Ideology: Statism; Nationalism; Protectionism
- Political position: Centre

The National Party (Spanish: Partido Nacional, PN) was a Colombian nationalist political party. The Party was established in 1886 and dissolved in 1902.

== Presidents ==
- Rafael Núñez: 1887–1888
- Carlos Holguín Mallarino: 1888–1892
- Miguel Antonio Caro: 1892–1898
- Manuel Antonio Sanclemente: 1898–1900
