= Constitutional history of Colombia =

The constitutional history of Colombia is the process of formation and evolution of the different constitutions that Colombia has had since its formation.

== Pre-Columbian and Spanish times ==
The indigenous nations that inhabited the present territory of Colombia did not have written records; therefore there is no evidence of constitutions prior to the arrival of the Spaniards.

During Colonial times, the Spaniards were supposed to behave according to the Laws of Burgos of 1512 that defined the rights of the indigenous people but most importantly legalised the right of the Spaniards over them. These were replaced by the New Laws of Indies of 1542. The Monarchy of Spain tried to enforce these laws but revolts by Spaniards that benefited from oppressing the natives forced Charles V, Holy Roman Emperor to suppress them in 1545.

The Declaration of the Rights of Man and of the Citizen, translated and published by Antonio Nariño in 1794 and distributed in Santa Fe de Bogotá, could be considered the first draft of a political constitution in the New World. At present, the modern version of the Universal Declaration of Human Rights forms the core of the political constitutions of many countries. The Constitution of Canada, for example, is quite short and is limited almost exclusively to human rights and basic freedoms. Those rights and liberties were not an integral part of the initial Colombian constitutions, but some were slowly introduced until they were definitively and explicitly included in the Constitution of 1991, which has been in force since it replaced in July 1991 the Political Constitution of 1886.

The first written constitution as such with jurisdiction in Colombia was the Spanish Constitution of 1808. The Spanish Constitution of 1812 also had theoretical jurisdiction during the Reconquista of Spanish America until Independence in 1819.

During colonial times, the Catholic Church was the most powerful institution after the Monarchy of Spain. The Church had control over the press, education, literacy and access to professions. It was the decisive authority in matters of public and private morality and the government would turn to it to obtain civil servants when laymen were not available.

During the fight for independence, and after, the Church was losing its influence, but it continued take a decisive part in the decision making process. In particular, the federalists wanted to create a constitution without clerical influence, whereas the centralists leaned towards the Church not only to preserve the faith but as a political body. The minimum geographic area able to send members to the congresses were the parishes. In larger urban areas there could be several parishes.

== Independence ==
At the time of independence from Spain, Colombia was part of the Viceroyalty of New Granada and thus continued to be named until August 10, 1819 when the republican armies arrived in Santa Fe de Bogotá and the Spanish viceroy Juan José de Sámano y Uribarri fled.

=== Memorandum of Grievances (Memorial de Agravios): 1809 ===
Camilo Torres Tenorio

In 1809, before the events of the Colombian Declaration of Independence took place, the Cabildo (council) of Santa Fe de Bogotá decided it was advisable to send a representative to the Junta Suprema Central located in Seville. It commissioned Camilo Torres Tenorio to draft the document known in Colombian history by the name "Memorandum of Grievances". For reasons that are unknown, the Cabildo did not accept this document. Jose Maria Cárdenas, descendant of Camilo Torres, commented that "the Cabildo was intimidated when shown the representation project and decided to archive it". On July 20, 1810, Colombia declared independence from Spain. The "Memorandum of Grievances" was kept unpublished until 1832.

Although the "Memorandum of Grievances" did not have any direct political effect and only few people knew of it at the time, its content is useful, more than any other document, to gauge the changes that were taking place in the political climate of Spanish America. It shows the attitudes that Criollos (locally born people of pure or mostly Spanish ancestry) had towards assuming a role in the government within the domains of Ferdinand VII of Spain. Some were royalists and others favored independence. The document demanded the same level of representation for Criollos in the American provinces as that of residents born in Spain (known as Peninsulares). This demand was based on the claim that Criollos were "descendants of Conquistadors" and the "legitimate heirs of the Spanish hegemony" which the conquistadors had established over the native populations of America, at whom they looked with some contempt.

=== Constitution of Socorro: 1810 ===
From 1809 to 1830 eight different provinces produced their own independent constitutions so there was not a single unified constitution in the country of Colombia. The Constitution of the Free State of Socorro in 1810 was the first of these. It was simultaneously federalist, democratic, liberal and catholic.

Socorro was the capital of the province of Santander at the time, where 30 years before the second Revolt of the Comuneros took place.

=== Constitution of Cundinamarca: 1811 ===
After the Colombian Declaration of Independence, the Junta (Meeting) of August 20, 1810 was created. Jose Miguel Pey de Andrade was appointed head of the Meeting, which makes him the first Chief of State.

The Constituent Electoral College of the State of Cundinamarca can be considered the first Constituent National Assembly and Congress. It met in Santa Fe de Bogotá in March 1811 and, with many difficulties due to disagreements between centralists and federalists, promulgated the first constitution with national scope: The Constitution of the state of Cundinamarca on April 4, 1811. The document was inspired by the United States Constitution. The assembly appointed the second Chief of State, Jorge Tadeo Lozano, for a period of three years. Because of internal pressures and frays, the assembly forced him to resign on September 19, 1811 and chose Antonio Nariño instead.

=== United Provinces: 1811 ===
By the end of 1810, other constitutions had arisen in different urban centres like Cartagena, Tunja, Antioquia, Mariquita and Neiva. Some of these (Cartagena, Tunja, Antioquia, Casanare, Pamplona and Popayán) sent representatives to The Congress of the United Provinces that met initially in Santa Fe de Bogotá and later in Tunja and Villa de Leyva.

On the second Sunday of October 1811 the first elections were held in Tunja. For each 2000 inhabitants there was a representing elector, and one for each municipality even if it did not have a population of this size. Any man 20 years old or older or anybody 15 or older and with "a modest occupation" could vote. The first name for the republic was established officially on November 27: United Provinces of New Granada.

The Constituent Electoral College of the State of Cundinamarca elected Pedro Groot as its first president on December 23, and the following day Antonio Nariño as acting president. At the meeting of October 4, 1812, the United Provinces elected Camilo Torres Tenorio as president (a position he held until October 5, 1814) and declared the union to be federalist as opposed to centralist. Simón Bolivar and Antonio Nariño were in favor of centralism, which was also becoming more popular in Santa Fe de Bogotá. This disagreement threw the United Provinces into an armed confrontation at the end of 1812, and a second one, without Nariño, in 1814.

Federalists (partisans of Francisco de Paula Santander, who saw centralism as a restriction of freedom) would later evolve into the Liberal Party of Colombia. Centralists (partisans of Antonio Nariño and Simón Bolívar, who wanted to see the nation centralized) would evolve into the Colombian Conservative Party.

Once Ferdinand VII recovered from the Peninsular War, royal forces led by Pablo Morillo defeated the revolutionary forces. In August, September and October 1816 Morillo executed most constitutional leaders, including Camilo Torres, and restored the Real Audiencia in Santa Fe de Bogotá in March 1817.

Nariño was arrested in Pasto in May 1814 and imprisoned in Spain. He remained so until 1821.

== The Gran Colombia ==
=== Congress of Angostura ===
Although in 1819 some large areas were still under Spanish control, the urge for independence energised the political climate. On February 15, 1819, six months before the Battle of Boyacá, representatives of Venezuela (now Venezuela), New Granada (now Colombia and Panama) and Quito (now Ecuador) met in Angostura, Venezuela. This meeting, called the Congress of Angostura, worked on the development of a "Fundamental Law" (constitution). Representatives from Quito were few since that province was still under Spanish control. These were the decisions taken initially:

- New Granada was renamed Cundinamarca and its capital Santa Fe de Bogotá renamed Bogotá. The Capital of the province of Quito would be the city of Quito. The Capital of Venezuela would be Caracas. The capital of Colombia would be Bogotá.
- The Republic of Colombia was created. In order to differentiate this period from present Republic of Colombia, historians have customarily called it Gran Colombia.
- The Republic would be governed by a president. There would be a vice president who would replace the president in his absence.
- The governors of the three Departments would also be called Vice Presidents.
- The presidents and vice-presidents would be elected with an indirect vote, but in the interim, the Congress chose them, as follows: President of the Republic: Simón Bolivar, Vice President of the Republic: Francisco Antonio Zea, Vice President of Cundinamarca: Francisco de Paula Santander, and Vice President of Venezuela: Juan Germán Roscio. The office of Vice President of Quito was left vacant as Quito was still under Spanish control. In August, Bolivar continued his mission of liberation and left for Ecuador and Peru, with Santander remaining in charge of the country.
- Bolivar was given the title of "Liberator" and his picture with the motto "Bolivar, Liberator of Colombia and father of the Motherland" was exhibited in the congress assembly hall.

After the Battle of Vargas Swamp and the Battle of Boyacá, on December 17, 1819 the Congress of Angostura declared the Republic of Colombia formally created.

At the end of the sessions the Congress decided that it would meet again in Cúcuta, in January 1821, in order to publish the new constitution.

During his six years in captivity, Antonio Nariño had drafted a constitution. After The Precursor was released in Spain on March 23, 1820 he presented his constitution in Cúcuta, but he did not get much attention.

=== Congress of Cúcuta: 1821 ===
The Congress defined in Angostura met this time in Villa del Rosario, in Cúcuta, in the beginning of 1821. The Battle of Carabobo, on June 24, 1821, officially brought independence to Venezuela and on July 18 the Congress restarted with greater impetus in Cúcuta to include the regions recently liberated: Caracas, Cartagena, Popayán and Santa Marta.

The Colombian Constitution of 1821 was proclaimed on August 30, 1821 and published on July 12. This has been considered the first Constitution of Colombia that was effective in Gran Colombia until its dissolution in 1831. It consisted of 10 chapters and 91 articles, but the most important points are:

- It promulgated the progressive emancipation of slaves: the children of enslaved parents would be free at age 18. It also created a fund to ensure that released slaves would have means to subsist. The fund was collected from a percentage of inheritances that varied from 0.15% to 10%. This happened 42 years before slavery was abolished in United States.
- It ended the Inquisition and made reforms regarding bishops, archbishops and church property.
- The Government of Colombia was declared popular and representative.
- It confirmed the division into three great departments: Cundinamarca, Venezuela and Quito. These departments were divided in 7 normal departments (not counting Panama and Quito; their fate was still in the future); three of Venezuela: Orinoco, Venezuela and Zulia, and four of Cundinamarca: Bogotá, Cundinamarca, Cauca and Magdalena. Each departament was divided into provinces, the provinces into cantons, cantons into cabildos and municipalities, and then into parishes. Venezuela consisted of ten provinces, Cundinamarca thirteen (to which the two Panamanian provinces would later be added), and Quito had seven provinces.
- Each parish would have an Assembly that would meet the last Sunday of July every four years. The members of these Assemblies would designate the voters of the cantons. Voters were required to be 25 years old and should have more than 500 piastras in real estate or 300 in rent.
- Men age 21 or older with one hundred piastras (or an equivalent income from an occupation) and who (after 1840) knew how to read and write could also vote.
- These would constitute the provincial Assembly of voters who would meet the first day of October every four years, in order to elect the president and vice-president of the Republic, the senator of the Department and the representative or representatives of the province. These departmental civic employees would serve terms of four years.
- The Congress would be formed by two chambers: the Senate and the chamber of Representatives. The senators would be appointed for a period of eight years and the representatives for a period of four years.
- Each department would have 4 senators: two for eight years and two for four-year terms. These differences were incorporated with the aim of renewing the Senate every four years.
- Senators should be 30 years old, Criollo by birth, have real estate worth 4000 piastras or a rent of 500 piastras per year, and practising a liberal profession. Foreigners were also allowed to be senators if they had been established in the country for twelve years and owned real estate worth 16000 piastras.
- The Chamber of Representatives would be made up of Deputies: one per 30,000 inhabitants.
- Delegates must be 25 and possess property worth 2000 piastras or a rent of 500 piastras, or be a professional. It was necessary to reside in the country two years before election. Foreigners had a residence requirement of eight years and had to have real estate worth 10000 piastras.
- The House of Representatives would have the exclusive faculty to accuse the president, the vice-president and the ministers of the High Court of Justice before the Senate.
- The Constitution established that sessions of both chambers be public; that the main civil servants be excluded from legislative functions; that their members enjoy immunity during their term, and that they receive pay.
- The Executive authority was to consist of a president and a vice-president, chosen for 4 years, who could not be re-elected and who, in case of death, would be replaced by the president of the Senate. The president would have a pay of 30000 piastras per year, and the vice-president 16000.
- Each department would be administered by an intendant and a governor, the former appointed by the president and the latter under the orders of the intendant.
- It established the positions of ministers, council, and supreme court, and regulated each position.
- The Congress chose Simón Bolivar by vote as president and Francisco de Paula Santander as vice-president, but since Bolivar was absent Santander took the presidency and Nariño the vice-presidency.

On May 24, 1822 the province of Quito sealed its independence in the Battle of Pichincha; and on December 9, 1824 the Battle of Ayacucho sealed Peru's (what today is Peru and Bolivia). Peru and Bolivia never formed part of the Gran Colombia but they share with Ecuador, Venezuela and Colombia the title of Bolivarian Countries, being republics liberated by Simón Bolivar, to whom the congress bestowed the title of Libertador, and was considered the first official president of each of them.

=== Separation of Ecuador and Venezuela: 1830 ===
The issue that initiated the separation of Venezuela and Quito from the Gran Colombia was the difference of opinions between federalists and centralists. Quito did not have a real representation in the constitutional deliberations and it was not until 1822 that joined the Gran Colombia. In spite of support for the constitution in Quito, and more specifically in Guayaquil, the people of Venezuela and Quito longed for a federalist constitution, one that would allow them to have regional freedom and control without strong central impositions. The Venezuelan military, in particular, wanted to exert more power in their region.

The members of the army had been allowed to vote in the elections since the constitution of Cúcuta in recognition of their efforts in the liberation. In 1827 the congress decided to reduce that right and made a constitutional change to exclude the ranks below sergeants, since excluding higher ranks was considered too bold.

In April 1828 the representatives of the municipalities (parishes) met in Ocaña to choose the constituent congress that would reform the constitution of Cúcuta. The Santanderists (federalists) formed a large contingent. The displeasure of the Bolivarians (centralists) was such that they decided to leave the deliberations, thus not allowing a quorum to be obtained. This unwillingness to behave democratically and solve problems with dialogue, negotiation and vote, deciding on abandonment of the process instead, was a behavior that the political parties of Colombia would maintain during the nineteenth and twentieth centuries, and it would generate violence. Nevertheless, the members in the elections of July 1, 1828 were appointed.

Bolivar was eager to see Colombia united and decided to impose his will in a dictatorial fashion as a last resort. In August 1828, he presented a constitution in which he included Peru and Bolivia (by then, Bolivia had already separated from Peru), with a strong central government and a presidency for life in which the president could have the faculty to appoint his successor. That was the final spark that set afire the Santanderistas because they saw in that proposal a backward movement towards monarchy; on September 25 there was an assassination attempt on Bolivar. The leaders of Venezuela saw Bolivar's intentions with enough distrust that in November 1829 they decided to separate from Colombia. They let this be known at the convention of January 1829. Bolivar finally resigned his position during the constitutional convention in January 1830 held in Bogotá (also called the Admirable Congress); his health was starting to fail.

The Inhabitants of Quito, knowing that Venezuela had separated and that Bolivar was retired, decided to separate as well. Thus The Gran Colombia vanished after 11 years of existence.

The displeasure of military and liberal groups was accentuated and General Rafael Urdaneta's dictatorship ensued. Finally in December 1830 Simón Bolivar the liberator died.

=== The Admirable Congress and the Constitution of 1830 ===
Trying to avoid the separation of Ecuador and Venezuela, the Admirable Congress (named thus due to the highly regarded people who formed it) worked on the Constitution of 1830, limiting centralism and giving the regions and municipalities more power. The separation came before this constitution could be in effect, but would become a model for following constitutions since it had a moderate and conciliatory tone.

== The constitution of 1832: Republic of New Granada ==
The Gran Colombia (without Venezuela and Ecuador) consisted of Panama, Magdalena, Boyacá, Cundinamarca and the Cauca, and these departments were subdivided into about 15 provinces. On October 20, 1831 the Granadine Convention approved the separation and established a centralized republic officially called Republic of New Granada with some federal characteristics. The constitution established a presidentialist regime. The congress appointed Francisco de Paula Santander president for a period of four years. On November 17, 1831 the Fundamental Law was promulgated, but the Congress continued working on it throughout 1832. The term for senators was reduced form eight to four years and that of representatives from four to two. Provinces, now called Departments, were granted greater representation and power, and were administered by a governor and the assemblies. The former was appointed by the president and the latter chosen by vote. Centralists and the Catholic Church began to be called "Conservatives" and their opponents, the federalists, "Liberals".

=== The Reform of 1843 ===
The country had gone through the War of the Convents or the War of the Supremes from 1839 to 1841 so during the presidency of General Pedro Alcántara Herrán the Congress strengthened the office of president to an authoritarian and centralist extent with the purpose of keeping the national territory in order, something that Conservatism, being the ruling party, used to its advantage.

This reform eliminated the free press, gave the Catholic Church a monopoly over education and allowed the Jesuits, who had been expelled, to return.

Between 1849 and 1853 the number of provinces, now renamed departments, increased from 22 to 36.

=== The Reform of 1853 ===
The constitution of 1832 leaned towards liberalism with the Reform of 1853. Now federalism prevailed; slavery was eliminated; the suffrage was extended to all men aged 21 and older; the direct popular vote to choose congressmen governors and magistrates was implemented; administrative and religious freedom were established; the State separated from the Church, and the juristic power of the Catholic Church was terminated. Some of these reforms were reverted later in the 1886 constitution.

Elections to choose the solicitor and the Supreme Court of Justice took place in September 1853. On October 3, 1853 the governor of Bogotá was chosen, counting the votes by parochial district.

During 1848 and 1849 the traditional parties, Liberal and Conservative, finally coined their names. Their ideological differences became solid and the emphasis on personal characters waned.

As of 1849, during the government of General José Hilario López the country began a strong political and economic transformation because of the shift from colonialism towards capitalism.

== The constitution of 1858: Granadine Confederation ==
Under the mandate of the conservative Mariano Ospina Rodríguez, the country was officially renamed Granadine Confederation in this constitution. The confederation was formed by eight states. The provinces were granted greater representation and power: each state could have independent legislative attributes and the possibility of choosing its own president.

The vice-presidency was abolished and it was replaced with one designate appointed by the Congress. The president and senators would be elected for a period of 4 years and the chamber for 2.

In 1859 an electoral law conferred the president of the confederation the power to replace state presidents and to take part in questions of public order, and conferred the upon Congress the right to judge the elections of the states.

== The constitution of 1863: United States of Colombia ==
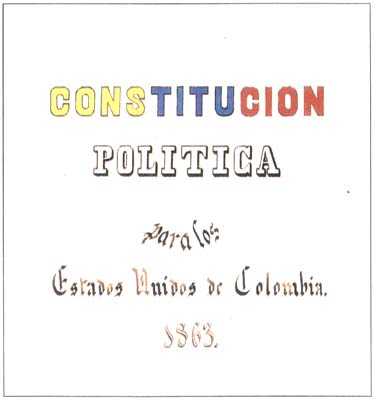
Constitution of 1863, also known as the Rionegro Constitution

The radical liberals had won the Colombian Civil War (1860–1862), and created the Constitution of Rionegro promulgated on May 8, 1863.

On February 3, 1863 Congress approved the name United States of Colombia for the country.

The new constitution liberalized social and economic policies, proclaiming the freedom to express one's ideas orally or in written form; freedom to work or to organize any business; freedom of the press; freedom to travel through the territory; to enter or to leave it; freedom of education, freedom of religion, freedom of association, and freedom to possess arms and ammunition.

It established a federal system with a central presidency (presidency of the union) for two years and without the possibility of immediate re-election. The election of the president of the union was indirect: each one of the Nine States (Panama, Antioquia, Magdalena, Bolivar, Santander, Boyacá, Cundinamarca, Tolima and the Cauca) would choose their candidates following particular electoral procedures for each state; then, each one of the nine states would deposit a vote to elect the president of the union. The winning candidate was that who had the absolute majority of votes; if an absolute majority was not obtained, the Congress would choose him from the same group of candidates.

Under this decentralized regime, regionalistic feelings reached their ultimate expression.

On May 12, four days after having proclaimed the constitution, the 61 delegates chose Tomás Cipriano de Mosquera to govern for two years until April 1, 1864, the moment at which the new regulations to name a president would start. Mosquera had the anticlerical tone of liberalism, and the conservatives a pro-clerical tone that would continue for many decades.

=== The Reform of 1876 ===
This federal period produced forty two new state constitutions and before 1876 elections were almost continuous, since the different states did not vote simultaneously, not even for the election of the president of the union. Therefore, a constitutional change was implemented so that the elections for president of each state were made at the same time in all the states.

== The constitution of 1886: Republic of Colombia ==
The coalition of moderate Liberals and Conservatives that ended the liberal hegemony and placed Rafael Núñez in power, repealed the Constitution of Rionegro with the Constitution of 1886. From now on, the country was officially called the Republic of Colombia.

The Constituent Assembly consisted of 18 delegates, two from each of the nine states.

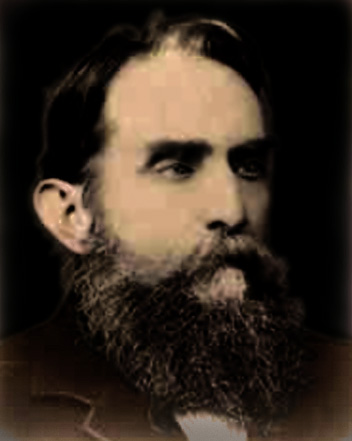
Rafael Núñez, Colombian politician, 1885.

Rafael Núñez announced a national Regeneration program and changed the country from a decentralized federal system to a centralized system with a strong central presidency. The presidential period changed from two to six years. The president of the Republic was elected by the Congress. The president of the state was appointed governor who from that moment on was appointed by the president of the Republic. The governor would choose the mayors of his department, except the mayor of Bogotá who was chosen by the president himself. Thus the president in effect had control of the executive at all levels.

The re-election of the president in immediately subsequent periods was authorized.

The chamber, the departmental assemblies and the municipal councils were chosen by popular vote. The Senate was chosen by the departmental assemblies. The suffrage for elections of national scope was limited to literate men over the age of 21. The restriction of knowing how to read and to write did not apply in regional elections.

The position of the vice-president was reinstated, and initially occupied by Eliseo Payán.

The Colombian Constitution of 1886 remained in effect for more than one hundred years, guiding the mandate of twenty-three presidents of the Republic.

=== Separation of Panama: 1903 ===
On November 3, 1903 Panama separated from Colombia with support from the United States. On November 6 the United States recognized the sovereignty of Panama. On November 11 the United States informed Colombia they would oppose any Colombian troops trying to recover Panama. The Thousand Days' War had left Colombia too weak to prevent the separation. On November 18 the United States signed the Hay–Bunau-Varilla Treaty with Panama for the construction of the Panama Canal.

=== The Reform of 1905 ===
In December 1904, few months after being elected president, General Rafael Reyes, displeased because of their slowness in approving reforms he wanted to impose, closed the Congress. At the beginning of 1905 he summoned a National Constituent Assembly chosen by the departmental administrators.

The Assembly suppressed the vice-presidency, two of the designaturas and the Council of State. It also decided that the magistrates of the Supreme Court of Justice would serve for life, recognized the right of representation of minorities and the possibility to reform the Constitution by means of the National Assembly.

The National Assembly demonstrated its support to the government with a dictatorial character when it established a presidential period of 10 years for General Reyes with the possibility for him to appoint his own successor. In However General Reyes quit in 1909.

=== The Reform of 1910 ===
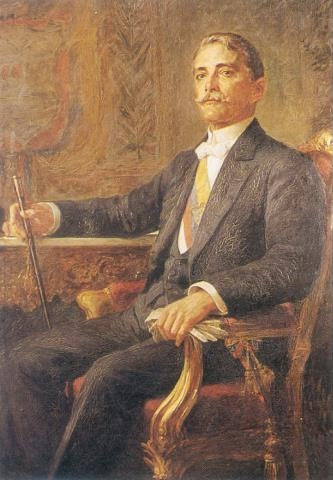
Carlos Eugenio Restrepo

After the overthrow and exile of General Rafael Reyes on June 13, 1909, the Congress chose the vice-president, Ramón González Valencia, to govern the remaining year in Reyes' term.

Ramon González summoned a National Assembly in 1910 to reform the Colombian Constitution of 1886. This important reform banned the participation of the military in politics, established the direct popular election of the president of the republic, departmental assemblies and municipal council; it reduced the presidential period from 6 to 4 years, prohibited the immediate re-election of presidents, eliminated the position of vice-president and replaced it with one appointee that would be chosen by the congress; it established a system of proportions for the appointment of the members of public corporations according to the votes obtained, assuring a minimum of one third for the opposition party; it granted the congress the right to choose the magistrates of the Supreme Court of Justice, consecrated the constitutional control to the Supreme Court of Justice.

The president kept the power to name governors who in turn would appoint mayors, corregidores, administrators, directors of post offices, heads of jails, managers of banks, and some others.

The Constituent National Assembly appointed Carlos Eugenio Restrepo to be the first president of the Republican Union on July 15.

=== The Reform of 1936 ===
During the government of Alfonso López Pumarejo, on August 1, 1936 the congress made several reforms. The right of suffrage was extended to all men 21 or older, eliminating the literacy requirement.

=== The Reform of 1954 ===
During the government of Gustavo Rojas Pinilla and by his suggestion, The National Constituent Assembly unanimously recognized the voting rights of women on August 25, 1954. Women exerted this right for the first time during the plebiscite of December 1, 1957.

=== The Reform of 1957 ===
In October 1957 the temporary Military Junta that succeeded Rojas Pinilla authorized legislation with the stated purpose of finding a solution to the problems of the country. This agreement and the corresponding period was called National Front.

A referendum held on 1 December 1957 approved the constitutional reform giving parity to both traditional parties for a term of 12 years. It was determined that the elections for President of the Republic, Congress, Departmental Assemblies, and Municipal Councils would take place during the first semester of 1958.

=== The Reform of 1958 ===
The first Congress elected by popular means within the National Front extended the term of the National Front from 12 to 16 years, and decided in addition that the first president would be liberal and not conservative.

=== The Reform of 1968 ===
Although the National Front ended in 1974, the constitutional reforms preparing the transition began in 1968 during the government of Carlos Lleras Restrepo, the next to last president of the National Front.

With the purpose of regulating the electoral competition between parties, the reforms eliminated the distribution by halves for departmental assemblies and municipal councils. Also included were some measures to recognize minority parties. Some required reforms were postponed, in some cases indefinitely, such Article 120 of the Constitution granting "the right and fair participation of the second party in voting". Article 120 had the unintended effect of limiting the participation of minority parties and therefore limiting citizen participation.

=== The Reform of 1984 ===
During the government of Belisario Betancur the congress established popular voting for mayors and governors on November 21, 1984.

== The constitution of 1991 ==
During peace negotiations with various rebel groups during the mandate of president Virgilio Barco Vargas, the guerrilla detachment M-19 insisted that one of the main requirements for them to lay down arms was the creation of a Constituent Assembly of Colombia in order to modify the constitution which until then did not guarantee the creation and development of political parties other than the two traditional ones, nor give representation to minorities.

The government initially refused to put in motion the process for constitutional change. Students, in particular those at the universities, decided to begin a national popular movement proposing the formation of a Constituent National Assembly to resolve the constitutional issue. More than 50% of the voters approved the "Seventh Paper Ballot" and president César Gaviria Trujillo was forced by the Supreme Court to fulfill the popular mandate. Thus it was possible not only to obtain constitutional change, but also the guerrilla detachment M-19 laid down their arms and were integrated into the national political life, and the indigenous communities were henceforth guaranteed representation in Congress.

The Constitution of 1991 is called the Constitution of the Rights, as it recognizes and consecrates fundamental rights such as freedom of religion and freedom of expression. It also details economic and social rights specific to the social rule of law enshrined in Article 1 of the Constitution, and collective rights, some of which include public morality, free economic competition and the right to a healthy environment. In addition it creates the necessary mechanisms to ensure and protect those rights.

The student and political movement begun in 1989 resulted in 1990 in a Constituent Assembly of Colombia elected by direct popular vote, which one year later promulgated the Colombian Constitution of 1991 in Bogotá. The country kept the name "Republic of Colombia".

=== The Reform of 2005 ===
In 2004, president Álvaro Uribe from the independent party Colombia First proposed a constitutional reform to allow the re-election of the President in immediately subsequent periods. The proposal was approved according to the constitution procedures and the Constitutional Court declared it executable as of October 19, 2005. The first reelected president was Álvaro Uribe himself on May 28, 2006, obtaining a voting of 62.1%. Next in the polls was Carlos Gaviria Díaz, a candidate for the leftist party Alternative Democratic Pole, who obtained 22% of the vote.

The fact that Uribe and Gaviria were from independent parties highlights that an important era of ideological transformation occurred in the history of Colombia, even to the point where some mass media announced that bipartisanism had been fatally wounded.

It is also evident that a level of maturity had been reached in the electoral process, which had earned the confidence of the population and of opposition parties. The speed of the delivery of electoral data from the National Registration Office was also outstanding, as even observers abroad knew the results of 85% of the ballots before two hours had elapsed since the ballot boxes had closed.
