= List of presidential designates of Colombia =

List of presidential designates of Colombia

Below is a list of the office-holders until it was abolished and replaced by the restoration of the post of Vice President of Colombia in 1994.

== Republic of New Granada ==
Name	Term	Acting President
Juan Clímaco Ordóñez	28.04.1844 - 10.03.1845	
José Hilario López	10.03.1845 - 18.04.1846	
Rufino Cuervo y Barreto	18.04.1846 - 15.03.1847	
Diego Fernando Gómez	15.03.1847 - 30.03.1848	
Mariano Ospina Rodríguez	30.03.1848 - 12.03.1849	
Joaquín Gori	12.03.1849 - 07.03.1850	
José María Obando	07.03.1850 - 09.03.1851	
Manuel Murillo Toro	09.03.1851 - 30.03.1852	
Tomás de Herrera	30.03.1852 - 26.03.1853	
José Hilario López	26.03.1853 - 16.03.1854	
Tomás de Herrera	16.03.1854 - 05.06.1855	21.04.1854 - 05.08.1854
Joaquín París Ricaurte	05.06.1855 - 10.03.1856	
Tomás Cipriano de Mosquera	10.03.1856 - 04.03.1857	
Julio Arboleda	04.03.1857 - 12.04.1858	

== Granadine Confederation ==
Name	Term	Acting President
Julio Arboleda	12.04.1858 - 21.03.1859	
1. Pedro Fernández Madrid; 2. Pedro Alcántara Herrán; 3. Julio Arboleda	21.03.1859 - 02.03.1860	
1. Julio Arboleda; 2. Vicente Cárdenas; 3. Juan C. Uribe	02.03.1860 - 14.05.1863	17.08.1862 - 13.11.1862
Juan José Nieto Gil	Pacto de Unión 1861	25.01.1861 - 18.07.1861

== Colombia ==
Name	Term	Acting President
1. Santos Gutiérrez; 2. Eustorgio Salgar; 3. Juan José Nieto Gil	14.05.1863 - 06.04.1864	
Tomás Cipriano de Mosquera	06.04.1864 - 20.03.1865	
1. José Hilario López; 2. Santos Gutiérrez; 3. Francisco Javier Zaldúa	20.03.1865 - 17.02.1866	
1. José María Rojas Garrido; 2. Santos Acosta; 3. Marcelino Gutiérrez	17.02.1866 - 10.02.1867	01.04.1866 - 20.05.1866
1. Santos Gutiérrez; 2. Santos Acosta; 3. José María Villamizar Gallardo (1867), Joaquín Riascos (1867-1868)	10.02.1867 - 21.03.1868	23.05.1867 - 01.04.1868
1. Salvador Camacho; 2. Eliseo Payán; 3. Eustorgio Salgar	21.03.1868 - 20.02.1869	21.12.1868 - 02.01.1869
1. Santiago Pérez de Manosalbas; 2. Manuel Amador Fierro; 3. Antonio María Pradilla	20.02.1869 - 28.02.1870	22.06.1869 - 30.06.1869
1. Santos Gutiérrez; 2. Julián Trujillo; 3. Manuel Vengoechea	28.02.1870 - 13.02.1871	01.09.1870 - 17.09.1870
1. Salvador Camacho; 2. Manuel Amador Fierro; 3. Apolinar Rueda	13.02.1871 - 28.02.1872	11.07.1871
1. Eustorgio Salgar; 2. Ezequiel Rojas; 3. Buenaventura Correoso	28.02.1872 - 15.02.1873	
1. Santiago Pérez de Manosalbas; 2. Ramón Santodomingo Vila; 3. Joaquín Riascos	15.02.1873 - 25.02.1874	
1. Manuel Murillo Toro; 2. Venancio Rueda; 3. Emigdio Palau	25.02.1874 - 15.02.1875	
1. Aquileo Parra; 2. César Conto; 3. José Ignacio Díaz-Granados Morales	15.02.1875 - 28.02.1876	
1. Santiago Pérez de Manosalbas; 2. Eliseo Neira; 3. Joaquín Vengoechea	28.02.1876 - 28.02.1877	
1. Julián Trujillo; 2. Sergio Camargo Pinzón; 3. Pablo Arosemena	28.02.1877 - 24.02.1879	19.05.1877 - 13.08.1877
1. Felipe Pérez Manosalva; 2. Gil Colunje; 3. Ignacio José Manrique	24.02.1879 - 08.03.1880	
1. Julián Trujillo; 2. Francisco Javier Zaldúa; 3. Pablo Arosemena	08.03.1880 - 14.03.1881	
1. Julián Trujillo; 2. Manuel Uribe Ángel; 3. José María Campo Serrano	14.03.1881 - 06.02.1882	
1. Rafael Núñez; 2. José Eusebio Otalora; 3. Eliseo Payán	06.02.1882 - 07.02.1883	21.12.1882 - 07.02.1883
1. José Eusebio Otalora; 2. Daniel Aldana; 3. Ezequiel Hurtado	07.02.1883 - 15.03.1884	07.02.1883 - 31.03.1884
1. Ezequiel Hurtado; 2. José María Campo Serrano; 3. Pedro J. Sarmiento	15.03.1884 - 09.12.1885	01.04.1884 - 10.08.1884
José María Campo Serrano	09.12.1885 - 27.07.1888	01.04.1886 - 05.01.1887
Carlos Holguín Mallarino	27.07.1888 - 26.07.1890	07.08.1888 - 26.07.1888
Carlos Holguín Mallarino	26.07.1890 - 30.07.1892	26.07.1888 - 07.08.1892
Leonardo Canal González	30.07.1892 - 01.08.1894	
Guillermo Quintero Calderón	01.08.1894 - 01.08.1896	12.03.1896 - 17.03.1896
Euclídes de Angulo	14.03.1908 - 16.04.1908	14.03.1908 - 16.04.1908
Jorge Holguín	13.03.1909 - 25.09.1911	14.03.1909 - 07.06.1909 - 07.08.1909
1. Marco Fidel Suárez; 2. José María González Valencia	25.09.1911 - 11.08.1913	
1. Marco Fidel Suárez; 2. Jorge Holguín	11.08.1913 - 25.07.1918	07.08.1914
1. Pedro Nel Ospina; 2. Pedro Antonio Molina	25.07.1918 - 06.11.1921	
1. Jorge Holguín; 2. Jorge Vélez	06.11.1921 - 08.09.1922	11.11.1921 - 07.08.1922
1. José Joaquín Casas; 2. Miguel Arroyo Díez	08.09.1922 - 06.10.1927	
1. José Joaquín Casas; 2. Ignacio Rengifo	06.10.1927 - 05.11.1929	
1. Camilo C. Restrepo Callejas; 2. Félix Cortés	05.11.1929 - 10.07.1932	
1. Julián Uribe Gaviria; 2. Román Gómez	10.07.1932 - 02.10.1934	
1. Alberto Pumarejo; 2. Francisco Samper Madrid	02.10.1934 - 30.07.1937	
1. Gabriel Turbay; 2. Carlos Lozano y Lozano	30.07.1937 - 02.08.1938	
1. Gabriel Turbay; 2. Tulio Tascón	02.08.1938 - 10.08.1939	
1. Carlos Lozano y Lozano; 2. Tulio Tascón	10.08.1939 - 05.08.1943	09.10.1942 - 19.10.1942
1. Darío Echandía; 2. Aníbal Badel	05.08.1943 - 27.07.1945	19.11.1943 - 06.05.1944; 10.07.1944 - 12.07.1944
1. Alberto Lleras Camargo; 2. Ricardo Uribe Escobar	27.07.1945 - 05.08.1946	07.08.1945 - 07.08.1946
Carlos Arango Vélez	05.08.1946 - 29.11.1946	
Eduardo Santos Montejo	29.11.1946 - 30.10.1951	
Roberto Urdaneta Arbeláez	30.10.1951 - 30.07.1955	05.11.1951 - 13.06.1953
Gabriel París Gordillo	30.07.1955 - 20.08.1958	30.07.1955 - 03.08.1955
Darío Echandía	20.08.1958 - 31.08.1960	02.04.1960 - 18.04.1960
Carlos Lleras Restrepo	31.08.1960 - 02.04.1963	
José Antonio Montalvo	02.04.1963 - 27.09.1967	06.08.1963 - 08.08.1963
Julio César Turbay	27.09.1967 - 06.12.1972	11.06.1969 - 18.06.1969
Rafael Azuero Manchola	06.12.1972 - 04.09.1974	21.07.1973 - 23.07.1973
Indalecio Liévano Aguirre	04.09.1974 - 11.10.1978	20.09.1975 - 24.09.1975
Gustavo Balcázar Monzón	11.10.1978 - 27.08.1980	
Víctor Mosquera Chaux	27.08.1980 - 24.08.1982	03.02.1981 - 11.02.1981
Álvaro Gómez Hurtado	24.08.1982 - 05.09.1984	
Rodrigo Lloreda Caicedo	05.09.1984 - 15.10.1986	
Víctor Mosquera Chaux	15.10.1986 - 22.08.1990	
Luis Fernando Jaramillo	22.08.1990 - 05.08.1992	
Humberto de la Calle Lombana	05.08.1992 - 11.08.1993	
Juan Manuel Santos	11.08.1993 - 07.08.1994	

== See also ==
- Presidential Designate
- List of vice presidents of Colombia
