= List of ministers of foreign affairs of Colombia =

Head of the Ministry of Foreign Affairs of Colombia

Minister of Foreign Affairs of Colombia
- Ministro de Relaciones Exteriores de Colombia
- Incumbent; Vacante
- Ministry of Foreign Affairs
- Style: Madam Chancellor
- Appointer: President of Colombia
- Inaugural holder: Estanislao Vergara y Sanz de Santamaría as Secretary of Foreign Affairs
- Formation: 7 October 1821
- Succession: Five
- Salary: COL$12,981,949 (monthly)
- Website: www.cancilleria.gov.co

The following is a list of the people who have served as head of the Ministry of Foreign Affairs of Colombia. Until 1886, the Ministries were named Secretariats, thus the head of the Secretariat of Foreign Affairs was titled Secretary of Foreign Affairs.

== Secretaries and ministers of foreign affairs ==
=== Republic of Colombia (1819—1831) ===
| No. | Secretary of Foreign Affairs | Took office | Left office | President |
|---|---|---|---|---|
| 1 | Estanislao Vergara Santamaría | 1820 | 1821 | Simón Bolívar Palacios |
| 2 | Pedro Gual Escandón | 1821 | 1825 | Simón Bolívar Palacios |
| 3 | José Rafael Revenga | 1825 | 1826 | Simón Bolívar Palacios |
| 4 | José Manuel Restrepo Veléz | 1826 | 1827 | Simón Bolívar Palacios |
| 5 | José Rafael Revenga | 1827 | 1828 | Simón Bolívar Palacios |
| 6 | Estanislao Vergara y Santamaría | 1828 | 1828 | Simón Bolívar Palacios |
| 7 | José Joaquín de Olmedo y Maruri | 1828 | 1829 | Simón Bolívar Palacios |
| 8 | Estanislao Vergara y Santamaría | 1829 | 1830 | Simón Bolívar Palacios |
| 9 | Domingo Caycedo y Santamaría | 1830 | 1830 | Simón Bolívar Palacios |
| 10 | Vicente Borrero Costa | 1830 | 1831 | Joaquín de Mosquera y Arboleda |
| 11 | Juan García del Río | 1831 | 1831 | |
| 12 | José María del Castillo y Rada | 1831 | 1831 | |
| 13 | José Félix Restrepo Vélez | 1831 | 1831 | |
| 14 | José Francisco Pereira Martínez | 1831 | 1832 | Francisco de Paula Santander y Omaña |

=== Republic of New Granada (1832—1858) ===
| No. | Secretary of Foreign Affairs | Took office | Left office | President |
|---|---|---|---|---|
| 1 | José Francisco Pereira Martínez | 24 October 1831 | 3 April 1832 | Francisco de Paula Santander y Omaña |
| 2 | Alejandro Vélez Barrientos | 3 April 1832 | 3 April 1833 | Francisco de Paula Santander y Omaña |
| 3 | José Rafael Mosquera Hurtado | 3 April 1833 | 1 August 1833 | Francisco de Paula Santander y Omaña |
| 4 | Lino de Pombo O'Donnell | 1 August 1833 | 14 July 1835 | Francisco de Paula Santander y Omaña |
| 5 | Francisco Soto Montes de Oca | 14 July 1835 | 4 September 1835 | Francisco de Paula Santander y Omaña |
| 6 | Lino de Pombo O'Donnell | 4 September 1835 | 23 March 1836 | Francisco de Paula Santander y Omaña |
| 7 | José Nazario Florentino González Vargas | 23 March 1836 | 3 May 1836 | Francisco de Paula Santander y Omaña |
| 8 | Lino de Pombo O'Donnell | 3 May 1836 | 15 May 1838 | José Ignacio de Márquez Barreto |
| 9 | Pedro Alcántara Herrán Martínez | 15 May 1838 | 16 July 1839 | José Ignacio de Márquez Barreto |
| 10 | Tomás Cipriano de Mosquera y Arboleda | 16 July 1839 | 30 July 1839 | José Ignacio de Márquez Barreto |
| 11 | Alejandro Vélez Barrientos | 30 July 1839 | 28 January 1840 | José Ignacio de Márquez Barreto |
| 12 | Eusebio Borrero y Costa | 28 January 1840 | 18 May 1840 | José Ignacio de Márquez Barreto |
| 13 | Miguel Chiari Jiménez | 18 May 1840 | 27 May 1840 | José Ignacio de Márquez Barreto |
| 14 | Judas Tadeo Landínez | 27 May 1840 | 21 September 1840 | José Ignacio de Márquez Barreto |
| 15 | Lino de Pombo O'Donnell | 21 September 1840 | 9 October 1840 | José Ignacio de Márquez Barreto |
| 16 | Miguel Chiari Jiménez | 9 October 1840 | 13 May 1841 | José Ignacio de Márquez Barreto |
| 17 | Mariano Ospina Rodríguez | 13 May 1841 | 2 October 1843 | Pedro Alcántara Herrán Martínez |
| 18 | Tomás Joaquín de Acosta y Pérez de Guzmán | 2 October 1843 | 1 April 1845 | Pedro Alcántara Herrán Martínez |
| 19 | Juan María Gómez Pastor | 1 April 1845 | 9 October 1849 | Tomás Cipriano de Mosquera y Arboleda |
| 20 | Eusebio Borrero y Costa | 9 October 1849 | 28 May 1846 | Tomás Cipriano de Mosquera y Arboleda |
| 21 | Manuel María Mallarino Ibargüen | 28 May 1846 | 7 July 1846 | Tomás Cipriano de Mosquera y Arboleda |
| 22 | Juan Antonio Pardo Pardo | 7 July 1846 | 13 October 1846 | Tomás Cipriano de Mosquera y Arboleda |
| 23 | Manuel María Mallarino Ibargüen | 13 October 1846 | 20 July 1847 | Tomás Cipriano de Mosquera y Arboleda |
| 24 | Manuel Esteban Ancízar Basterra | 20 July 1847 | 7 February 1848 | Tomás Cipriano de Mosquera y Arboleda |
| 25 | Manuel María Mallarino Ibargüen | 7 February 1848 | 19 June 1848 | Tomás Cipriano de Mosquera y Arboleda |
| 26 | José María Galaviz | 19 June 1848 | 5 December 1848 | Tomás Cipriano de Mosquera y Arboleda |
| 27 | Justo Arosemena Quesada | 5 December 1848 | 12 January 1849 | Tomás Cipriano de Mosquera y Arboleda |
| 28 | Cerbeleón Pinzón | 12 January 1849 | 1 April 1849 | Tomás Cipriano de Mosquera y Arboleda |
| 29 | Manuel Murillo Toro | 1 April 1849 | 16 May 1849 | José Hilario López Valdéz |
| 30 | José Acevedo Tejada | 16 May 1849 | 7 June 1849 | José Hilario López Valdéz |
| 31 | Victoriano de Diego Paredes y Paramato | 7 June 1849 | 1 November 1851 | José Hilario López Valdéz |
| 32 | José María Plata Soto | 1 November 1851 | 1 March 1853 | José Hilario López Valdéz |
| 33 | Lorenzo María Lleras González | 1 March 1853 | 26 November 1853 | José María Obando del Campo |
| 34 | José Caicedo Rojas | 26 November 1853 | 1 January 1854 | José María Obando del Campo |
| 35 | Cerbeleón Pinzón | 1 January 1854 | 1 April 1855 | José María Obando del Campo |
| 36 | Lino de Pombo O'Donnell | 1 April 1855 | 1 April 1857 | José María Obando del Campo |
| 37 | Juan Antonio Pardo Pardo | 1 April 1857 | 1 April 1861 | Mariano Ospina Rodríguez |

=== Granadine Confederation (1858—1863) ===
| No. | Secretary of Foreign Affairs | Took office | Left office | President |
|---|---|---|---|---|
| 1 | Juan Antonio Pardo Pardo | 1 April 1857 | 1 April 1861 | Mariano Ospina Rodríguez |
| 2 | Manuel María Mallarino Ibargüen | 1 April 1861 | 18 July 1861 | Bartolomé Calvo Díaz |
| 3 | José María Rojas Garrido | 18 July 1861 | 23 November 1861 | Tomás Cipriano de Mosquera y Arboleda |
| 4 | Manuel Esteban Ancízar Basterra | 23 November 1861 | 1 December 1862 | Tomás Cipriano de Mosquera y Arboleda |
| 5 | José María Rojas Garrido | 1 December 1862 | 10 February 1863 | Tomás Cipriano de Mosquera y Arboleda |
| 6 | José Hilario López Valdéz | 10 February 1863 | 14 May 1863 | Tomás Cipriano de Mosquera y Arboleda |

=== United States of Colombia (1863—1886) ===
| Term start | Term end | Minister of Foreign Affairs |
|---|---|---|
| 1882 | 1882 | Jose Maria Quijnao Wallis |

=== Republic of Colombia (1886—2026) ===
| Term start | Term end | Minister of Foreign Affairs |
|---|---|---|
| 1887 | 1888 | Carlos Holguín Mallarino |
| 1891 | 1891 | Antonio Roldán |
| 1891 | 1895 | Marco Fidel Suárez |
| 1895 | 1896 | José Maria Uricoechea |
| 1897 | 1898 | Jorge Holguín |
| 1897 | 1898 | Antonio Gómez Restrepo |
| 1898 | 1899 | Felipe Fermín Paul |
| 1899 | 1900 | Carlos Cuervo Márquez |
| 1900 | 1901 | Carlos Martínez Silva |
| 1901 | 1902 | Antonio José Uribe |
| 1902 | 1903 | Felipe F. Paúl |
| 1903 | 1904 | Luis Carlos Rico |
| 1904 | 1904 | Francisco de Paula Mateus |
| 1904 | 1904 | Enrique Cortés |
| 1904 | 1906 | Clímaco Calderón |
| 1906 | 1908 | Gral. Alfredo Vázquez Cobo |
| 1908 | 1908 | Gral. Marceliano Vargas |
| 1908 | 1909 | Francisco José Urrutia |
| 1909 | 1909 | Guillermo Camacho |
| 1909 | 1909 | Carlos Cuervo Márquez |
| 1909 | 1909 | Marco Fidel Suárez |
| 1909 | 1910 | Carlos Calderón |
| 1910 | 1911 | Enrique Olaya Herrera |
| 1911 | 1912 | José María González Valencia |
| 1912 | 1914 | Francisco José Urrutia |
| 1914 | 1917 | Miguel Abadía Méndez |
| 1917 | 1918 | Pedro Antonio Molina |
| 1918 | 1918 | Jorge Holguín |
| 1918 | 1919 | Pedro Antonio Molina |
| 1919 | 1920 | Hernando Holguín y Caro |
| 1920 | 1920 | Francisco Montaña |
| 1920 | 1921 | Laureano García Ortiz |
| 1921 | 1921 | José Vicente Concha |
| 1921 | 1921 | Carlos Adolfo Urueta |
| 1921 | 1922 | Enrique Olaya Herrera |
| 1922 | 1922 | Antonio José Uribe |
| 1922 | 1922 | Lucas Caballero Barrera |
| 1922 | 1922 | Carlos Adolfo Urueta |
| 1922 | 1925 | Jorge Vélez |
| 1925 | 1926 | Eduardo Restrepo Sáenz |
| 1926 | 1927 | Marco Fidel Suárez |
| 1927 | 1930 | Carlos Uribe |
| 1930 | 1930 | Francisco Samper Madrid |
| 1930 | 1930 | Eduardo Santos Montejo |
| 1930 | 1931 | Raimundo Rivas |
| 1931 | 1935 | Roberto Urdaneta Arbeláez |
| 1935 | 1935 | Enrique Olaya Herrera |
| 1935 | 1935 | Francisco Samper Madrid |
| 1935 | 1936 | Ernesto González Piedrahita |
| 1936 | 1937 | Jorge Soto del Corral |
| 1937 | 1938 | Gabriel Turbay |
| 1938 | 1938 | Antonio Rocha |
| 1938 | 1940 | Francisco Samper Madrid |
| 1940 | 1942 | Luis López de Mesa |
| 1942 | 1943 | Gabriel Turbay |
| 1943 | 1943 | Francisco José Chaux |
| 1943 | 1943 | Gabriel Turbay |
| 1943 | 1944 | Carlos Lozano y Lozano |
| 1944 | 1945 | Darío Echandía Olaya |
| 1945 | 1945 | Alberto Lleras Camargo |
| 1945 | 1946 | Fernando Londoño y Londoño |
| 1946 | 1946 | Francisco Umaña Bernal |
| 1946 | 1947 | Carlos Lozano y Lozano |
| 1947 | 1947 | Luis López de Mesa |
| 1947 | 1948 | Domingo Esguerra Plata |
| 1948 | 1948 | Laureano Gómez Castro |
| 1948 | 1949 | Eduardo Zuleta Ángel |
| 1949 | 1949 | Guillermo León Valencia Muñoz |
| 1949 | 1949 | Eduardo Zuleta Ángel |
| 1949 | 1950 | Eliseo Arango |
| 1950 | 1950 | Evaristo Sourdis Juliao |
| 1950 | 1952 | Gonzalo Restrepo Jaramillo |
| 1952 | 1953 | Juan Uribe Holguín |
| 1953 | 1953 | Guillermo León Valencia Muñoz |
| 1953 | 1956 | Evaristo Sourdis Juliao |
| 1956 | 1957 | José Manuel Rivas Sacconi |
| 1957 | 1958 | Carlos Sanz de Santamaría |
| 1958 | 1961 | Julio César Turbay Ayala |
| 1961 | 1962 | José Joaquín Caicedo Castilla |
| 1962 | 1963 | José Antonio Montalvo |
| 1963 | 1963 | Fernando Londoño y Londoño |
| 1963 | 1965 | Fernando Gómez Martínez |
| 1965 | 1966 | Castor Jaramillo Arrubla |
| 1966 | 1968 | Germán Zea Hernández |
| 1968 | 1970 | Alfonso López Michelsen |
| 1970 | 1974 | Alfredo Vázquez Carrizosa |
| 1974 | 1978 | Indalecio Liévano Aguirre |
| 1978 | 1981 | Diego Uribe Vargas |
| 1981 | 1982 | Carlos Lemos Simmonds |
| 1982 | 1984 | Rodrigo Lloreda Caicedo |
| 1984 | 1986 | Augusto Ramírez Ocampo |
| 1986 | 1990 | Cnel. Julio Londoño Paredes |
| 1990 | 1991 | Luis Fernando Jaramillo Correa |
| 1991 | 1994 | Noemí Sanín Posada |
| 1994 | 1996 | Rodrigo Pardo García-Peña |
| 1996 | 1998 | María Emma Mejía Vélez |
| 1998 | 1998 | Camilo Reyes Rodríguez |
| 1998 | 2002 | Guillermo Fernández de Soto |
| 2002 | 2006 | Carolina Barco Isakson |
| 2006 | 2007 | María Consuelo Araújo Castro |
| 2007 | 2008 | Fernando Araújo Perdomo |
| 2008 | 2010 | Jaime Bermúdez Merizalde |
| 2010 | 2018 | María Ángela Holguín |
| 2018 | 2019 | Carlos Holmes Trujillo |
| 2019 | 2021 | Claudia Blum |
| 2021 | 2022 | Marta Lucía Ramírez |
| 2022 | 2024 | Álvaro Leyva |
| 2024 | 2025 | Luis Gilberto Murillo |
| 2025 | 2025 | Laura Sarabia |
| 2025 | 2026 | Rosa Yolanda Villavicencio |
