= José María González Valencia =

Colombian lawyer, academic, diplomat and politician

Minister of Public Instruction
- In office August 10, 1918 – October 7, 1918
- Preceded by: Emilio Ferrero
- Succeeded by: Rafael Cárdenas Piñeros
- In office June 17, 1911 – November 23, 1911
- Preceded by: Pedro María Carreño
- Succeeded by: Marco Fidel Suárez
- In office June 10, 1909 – August 3, 1909
- Preceded by: Tulio Ospina
- Succeeded by: Benjamín Uribe

Second Presidential Designate of Colombia
- In office 1911–1913
- Preceded by: José María Campo
- Succeeded by: Jorge Holguín

Minister of Foreign Affairs
- In office November 23, 1911 – December 10, 1912
- Preceded by: Enrique Olaya Herrera
- Succeeded by: Francisco José Urrutia

Minister of Finance
- In office May 28, 1900 – July 31, 1900
- Preceded by: Carlos Calderón Reyes
- Succeeded by: Miguel Abadía Méndez

Minister of Government
- In office August 8, 1890 – January 3, 1891
- Preceded by: Vicente Restrepo
- Succeeded by: Guillermo Quintero Calderón

Minister of Justice
- In office October 15, 1890 – May 11, 1891
- Preceded by: Position established
- Succeeded by: Luis Antonio Mesa

Personal details
- Born: June 25, 1840 Pamplona, New Granada
- Died: 20th century
- Party: Conservative Party
- Education: Universidad del Rosario

José María González Valencia (born in Pamplona on June 25, 1840) was a Colombian Conservative politician, lawyer, academic, diplomat, writer and educator.

He was also a professor of law at the Faculty of Jurisprudence of the Colegio Mayor del Rosario, in Bogotá, where he became rector in January 1899. In politics he held several important positions such as Senator of the Republic, State Councilor, and Colombian minister to the Holy See. He was the first Minister of Justice in the history of Colombia, since his position was created in 1890 by then-president Carlos Holguín.

== Biography ==
José María González was born in Pamplona, then the Republic of New Granada, on June 25, 1840, into a middle-class family from the Norte de Santander region. González obtained his bachelor's degree from the Pío IX school in Pamplona, from where he earned a doctorate in law. González began his political career at the end of the 19th century, on behalf of the Colombian Conservative Party, to which one of his brothers also belonged.

President Carlos Holguín Mallarino appointed him Minister of Government, between August 8, 1890, and January 3, 1891, and almost simultaneously he was appointed Minister of Justice, between October 15, 1890, to May 11, 1891, being the first in office in the history of the country. Among his first and new functions as Minister of Justice, González had to direct access to justice, the prison system, Church-state relations, legislation and accounting.

In January 1899, González was elected rector of the Universidad del Rosario, and months later, during the administration of the nationalist Manuel Antonio Sanclemente, at the height of the Thousand Days' War, he served briefly as Minister of Finance since May 28, 1900, until the overthrow of Sanclemente, on July 31 of the same year.

Years later he served as Minister of Public Instruction during the brief government of Jorge Holguín, between June 10 and August 3, 1909, until his brother Ramón assumed the presidency. José María took up arms trying in vain to get Holguín back into the government and in the end he had to accept the legitimacy of Ramón in the presidency, who had been Reyes' vice president between 1904 and 1906.

He served as minister of public instruction from June 17 to November 23 and then became chancellor for the republican government of the conservative Carlos Eugenio Restrepo, between November 23, 1911, and December 10, 1912. In 1911 he was also elected by Congress as Second Presidential Designate for the period 1911–1913, being the first to hold the position since its abolition in 1885.

Between August 7 and October 7, 1918, that is, for exactly two months, he held his last public position, being Minister of Public Instruction for the third time, this time for President Marco Fidel Suárez.

== Family ==
José María was the eldest son of the marriage of Rafael González Rodríguez and Susana Valencia Bautista. He was the brother of Ramón, Cecilia, María Antonia, Matilde, Víctor, Luis Eusebio, Gertrudis and Mariana González Valencia. His older brother, Ramón, was a prominent soldier and became Vice President of Colombia during the government of Rafael Reyes, and was then named president in 1909.

González was married twice. The first was with Ana Josefa Concha Ferreira, sister of the conservative politician José Vicente Concha, who was president of the country between 1914 and 1918; and aunt of the priest Luis Concha Córdoba (son of José Vicente). With Ana, José María had 7 children: Juan Ernesto, María Ignacia, José María, Julio, Paulina, Rafael and Josefina González Concha.

His second wife was Tomasa Álvarez Moreno, with whom he had no children.
