= Colombian presidential line of succession =

Order of assuming powers of Colombian presidency

The Colombian presidential line of succession is the order which the vice president and other members of the Colombian national Government assume the powers and duties of the Colombian presidency (or the office itself, in the instance of succession by the vice president) upon an elected president's death in office, resignation, removal from office upon impeachment conviction or incapacity.

The order of succession specifies that the position passes to the vice president. If the vice presidency is simultaneously vacant, or if the vice president is also incapacitated, the powers and duties of the presidency pass to the cabinet ministers, according to their respective order of precedence.

== Current order of succession ==
The Constitution of Colombia establishes that the Vice President is the first person in the presidential line of succession. In the absence of both the president and the vice president, article 203 in the Constitution establishes that the presidential office will be assumed by a Cabinet member, in order of precedence that establishes the law. The assuming Minister must be a member of the same party or movement to which the original president belonged, who will exercise the presidency within thirty days following the presidential vacancy in which Congress elects a new vice president who will assume the presidency. In the table, the absence of a number in the first column indicates that the holder is not eligible.

No.	Office	Incumbent	Party
1	Vice President	José Manuel Restrepo	Defenders of the Homeland
2	Minister of the Interior	Rodrigo Lara Restrepo	Defenders of the Homeland
3	Minister of Foreign Affairs	Omar Bula	Defenders of the Homeland
– (Note: The Constitution establishes that the presidential office will be assumed by a minister in the order of precedence established by law. The sitting minister must be a member of the same party or movement as the original president.)	Minister of Finance and Public Credit	Miguel Gómez Martínez	National Salvation Movement
–	Minister of Justice and Law	Iván Cancino	National Salvation Movement
4	Minister of Defense	Jorge Eduardo Mora	Defenders of the Homeland
–	Minister of Agriculture	Indalecio Dangond	Independent
–	Minister of Health and Social Protection	Ana María Vesga	Independent
–	Minister of Labour	Natalia López Fuentes	Creemos Colombia
–	Minister of Energy	María Nohemí Arboleda	Independent
5	Minister of Commerce	Mauricio Gómez Amín	Defenders of the Homeland
6	Minister of Education	Viviane Morales	Defenders of the Homeland
–	Minister of Environment	Fabio Arjona	Independent
–	Minister of Housing	Jaime Andrés Beltrán	National Salvation Movement
–	Minister of ITC	Alexandra Falla	Independent
–	Minister of Transport	Elsa Noguera	Radical Change
–	Minister of Culture	Paola Holguín	Independent
–	Minister of Sports	Juliana Gutiérrez	Creemos Colombia
–	Minister of Science	Claudia Benavides Salazar	Independent

== Presidential succession by vice presidents ==
Three vice presidents have succeeded to the presidency during the period, two due to the resignation and one of them due to the deposition of the president in office.

Successor	Party	President	Reason	Date of succession
Miguel Antonio Caro	National	Rafael Núñez	Resignation	18 November 1894, 31 days into Núñez's presidency.
José Manuel Marroquín	Conservative	Manuel Antonio Sanclemente	Coup d'état	31 July 1900, 1 year, 11 months and 24 days into Sanclemente's presidency.
Ramón González Valencia	Conservative	Rafael Reyes	Resignation	4 August 1909, 4 years, 11 months and 28 days into Reyes's presidency.

== Presidential succession beyond the vice presidency ==
Although four vice presidents have succeeded to the presidency after the death or resignation of the president, between 1905 and 1994, the office of vice president was abolished, later being established in 1994 with the 1991 constitution, during the 86 years of abolition of the vice presidency, it was the Minister of Government who headed the line of presidential succession.

Successor	Party	President	Reason	Date of succession
Jorge Holguín	Conservative	Marco Fidel Suárez	Resignation	11 November 1921, 3 years, 3 months and 4 days into Suárez's presidency.
Gustavo Rojas Pinilla	Military rule	Laureano Gómez	Coup d'état	13 June 1953, 3 years, 5 months and 12 days into Gómez's presidency.

=== Next in line ===
Since 1991 there have been two cases in which the vice presidency became vacant; During those terms, the next people in line to serve as acting president were:

==== Under the Constitution of 1991 ====
No.	Official (party)	Dates	Reason	President (party)
1	Horacio Serpa (L); Minister of the Interior	September 10 – 16, 1996	Resignation of Vice president Humberto De la Calle	Samper (L)
2	Juan Guillermo Zuluaga (U); Minister of Agriculture	March 21 – 29, 2017	Resignation of Vice president German Vargas Lleras	Santos (U)

==== Under the Constitution of 1886 ====
===== Presidential designate =====
The 1886 Constitution established that the presidential designate was next in line of succession after the vice president. Later, in 1905, following the Constituent Assembly convened by President Rafael Reyes, the presidential designate became the automatic successor to the president until the adoption of the 1991 Constitution.

No.	Official (party)	Dates	Reason	President (party)
1	José María Campo Serrano (C)	5 August 1886– 7 January 1887	Resignation of Vice president Eliseo Payán	Núñez (N)
2	Vicente Restrepo (C); Minister of Foreign Affairs	7 August 1888– 17 October 1889	Carlos Holguín Mallarino's rise to the presidency	Holguín, C (C)
3	Antonio Roldán (C)	15 October 1889 – 10 March 1881	Carlos Holguín Mallarino's rise to the presidency	Holguín, C (C)
4	Guillermo Quintero Calderón (C)	12 March 1894 – 12 March 1896	Miguel Antonio Caro's rise to the presidency	Caro (C)
5	Euclides de Angulo (C)	12 – 18 March 1908	Abolition of the office of Vice President	Reyes (C)
6	Jorge Holguín Mallarino (C)	9 June – 4 August 1909	Abolition of the office of Vice President	Reyes (C)
7	Marco Fidel Suárez (C)	11 May 1911 – 6 June 1913	Abolition of the office of Vice President	Restrepo (C)

== See also ==
- Vice President of Colombia
