= Mallarino =

Mallarino is a Spanish surname. Notable people with the surname include:

- Carlos Holguín Mallarino (1832–1894), Colombian lawyer, journalist, and politician
- Jorge Holguín Mallarino (1848–1928), Colombian politician and military officer
- Manuel María Mallarino (1808–1872), the 8th Vice President of New Granada
  - Mallarino–Bidlack Treaty, a treaty signed between him and the U.S. minister Benjamin Alden Bidlack in 1846
