= First session of the United Nations General Assembly =

UNGA begins in London

- 10 January – 14 February 1946; 23 October – 15 December 1946 1st session 1st general debate
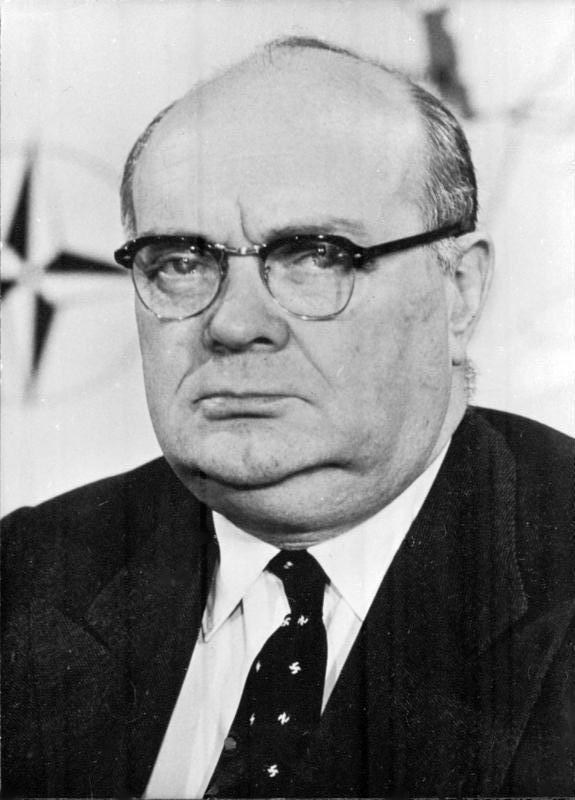
- President of the 1st General Assembly, Paul-Henri Spaak
- Venues: Westminster Central Hall, London, UK, and Flushing Meadows–Corona Park, New York City, US
- Participants: United Nations Member States
- President: Paul-Henri Spaak
- Secretary-General: Trygve Lie

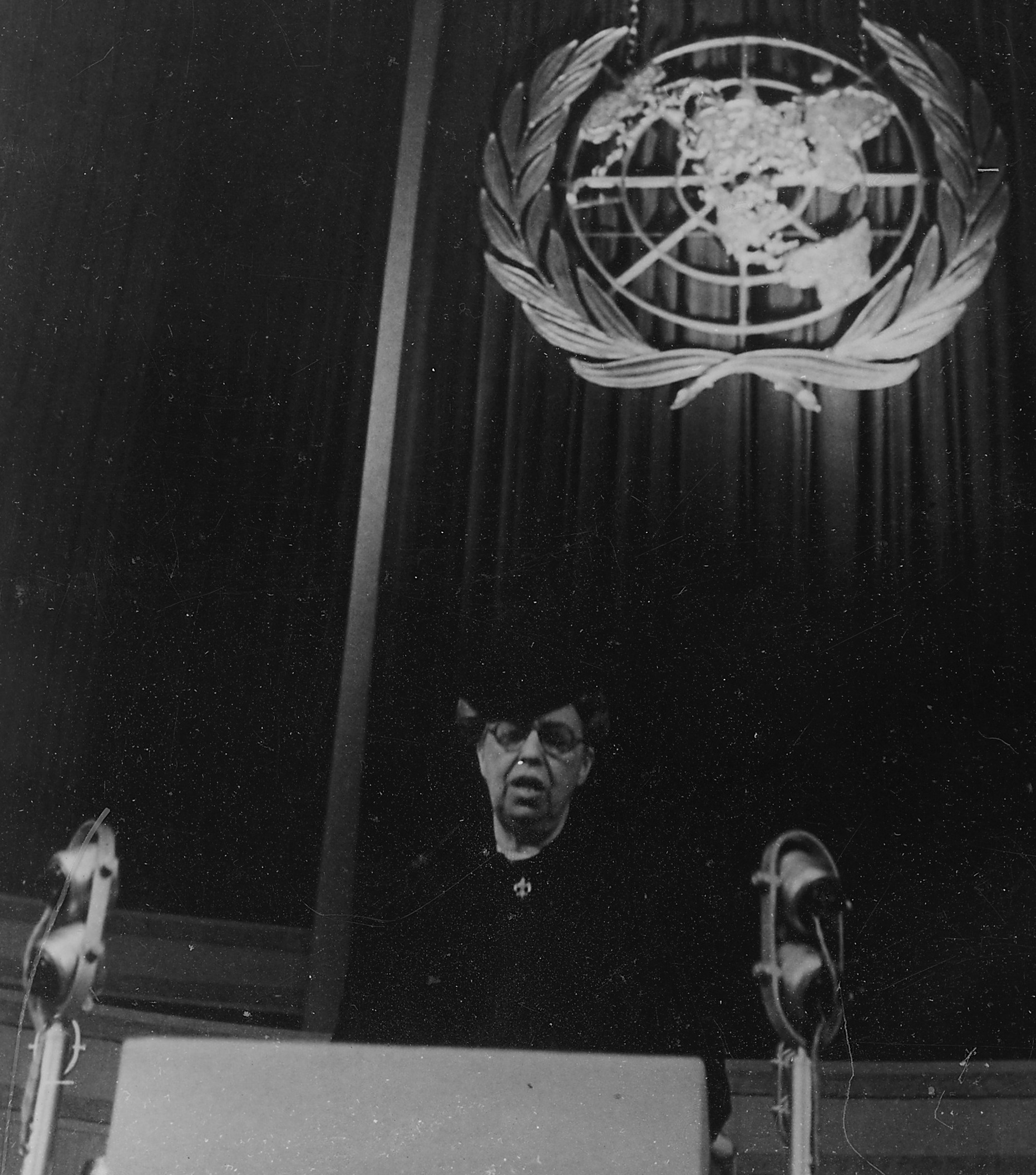
Eleanor Roosevelt at UNGA 1

First resolution adopted by the United Nations General Assembly

The first session of the United Nations General Assembly was the inaugural meeting of the UN's principal deliberative, policy-making and representative organ. It opened on 10 January 1946 at the Methodist Central Hall in London, and brought together representatives of the original 51 member states under the recently ratified United Nations Charter.

Dr. Eduardo Zuleta Ángel, head of the Colombian delegation to the UN and chairman of the Preparatory Commission of the United Nations, called the first meeting to order. Paul-Henri Spaak of Belgium was elected the first president of the General Assembly in a 28–23 vote, prevailing over Trygve Lie (who went on to be the first Secretary-General of the UN).

The second meeting of the first session opened in Flushing Meadows–Corona Park, New York, on 23 October 1946.

== Background ==
After the conclusion of World War II, Allied powers sought to establish a global organization to prevent future conflicts and promote international cooperation. The UN Charter was drafted at the United Nations Conference on International Organization in San Francisco in June 1945 and came into force on 24 October 1945 after ratification by the majority of signatories, including the five permanent members of the Security Council.

With the Charter in force but no permanent headquarters or fully staffed secretariat, a Preparatory Commission was established in London to transition the United Nations from its planning phase to full operation. The commission was led by Gladwyn Jebb of the United Kingdom, who served as Executive Secretary.

The choice of Methodist Central Hall as the venue for the gathering was symbolic. It took place four months after the end of the Second World War, in a time when the city was extensively damaged from The Blitz. Holding the Assembly in a church was meant to symbolize the pain experienced during the war and hope for a peaceful future under the newly established United Nations framework.

In preparation for the Assembly, the hall underwent significant modifications. Seating was removed to create space, carpets were laid, interpreting booths were installed, and long tables were set up to accommodate representatives of the 51 founding nations. The British government provided delegates with support, including access to a canteen, temporary ration books, clothing coupons, and organized tours of bomb-damaged areas by the Women's Voluntary Service.

British Foreign Secretary Ernest Bevin persuaded the church congregation to vacate the hall for the event, stating that "there could be no better place than a House of God, with the atmosphere of prayer already there".

Several notable figures addressed the Assembly during the meetings. British Prime Minister Clement Attlee urged that the United Nations become "the over-riding factor in foreign policy", emphasizing the avoidance of war and the establishment of global security and freedom.

Former First Lady of the United States Eleanor Roosevelt convened women delegates and delivered an 'Open Letter to the Women of the World', calling on governments to encourage women's active participation in national and international affairs and in the work of peace and reconstruction.

== London ==
The first meeting of the General Assembly convened on 10 January 1946 at Methodist Central Hall in Westminster, London. Ambassador Eduardo Zuleta Ángel of Colombia, chairman of the Preparatory Commission, formally called the meeting to order, emphasizing the urgency of implementing the purposes of the UN Charter in a world still recovering from war.

The meeting addressed early organizational matters, including basic procedures, committee formation, and preparation for future sessions. Delegations from the member states participated in debates and laid the groundwork for the Assembly's regular functions.

== New York ==
After adjournment in London, the session resumed later that year at Flushing Meadows–Corona Park in New York City on 23 October 1946. It was the first time the General Assembly convened in North America. This venue, originally constructed for the 1939 World's Fair, served as a temporary office for the UN before the organization's permanent headquarters were established in Manhattan.

=== Headquarters ===
In the first part of its first session in London, the General Assembly addressed where the United Nations should establish its long-term headquarters. On 14 February 1946, at its 33rd plenary meeting, the Assembly adopted a resolution deciding that the permanent seat of the United Nations should be located in Westchester County, New York, and/or Fairfield County, Connecticut, near New York City, and that New York City would serve as the interim headquarters pending a final decision.

Later that year, an offer by John D. Rockefeller Jr. to donate US$8.5 million to purchase an approximately 17–18-acre site along Manhattan's East River led the General Assembly to revisit its earlier decision. In Resolution 100(I) of 14 December 1946, the Assembly repealed the prior location choice and instead resolved to establish the permanent headquarters of the United Nations at the present Midtown Manhattan site.

== See also ==
- List of UN General Assembly sessions
- List of General debates of the United Nations General Assembly
