= José María González =

José María González may refer to:

- José María González Hermosillo (1774–1818), insurgent in the Mexican War of Independence who gave his name to Hermosillo, Sonora
- José Gonzales, governor of the Mexican territory of Santa Fe de Nuevo México in 1837, also known as José María Ángel González
- José González Rubio (1804–1875), Mexican Franciscan friar in the missions of Alta California
- José María González Valencia (1840–?), Colombian politician, diplomat and writer
- José María González Valencia (priest) (1884–1959), Mexican prelate of the Roman Catholic church, archbishop of Durango
- Chumy Chúmez (José María González Castrillo, 1927–2003), Spanish humorist, writer and film director
- José María González Santos (born 1975), Spanish teacher and politician

== See also ==
- Jose Mari Gonzales (1938–2019), Filipino entertainer and politician
- José González Valencia (born 1975), Mexican drug trafficker, sometimes reported as "José María"
- José González (disambiguation)
