= Fernando Gómez Martínez =

Colombian politician (1897–1985)

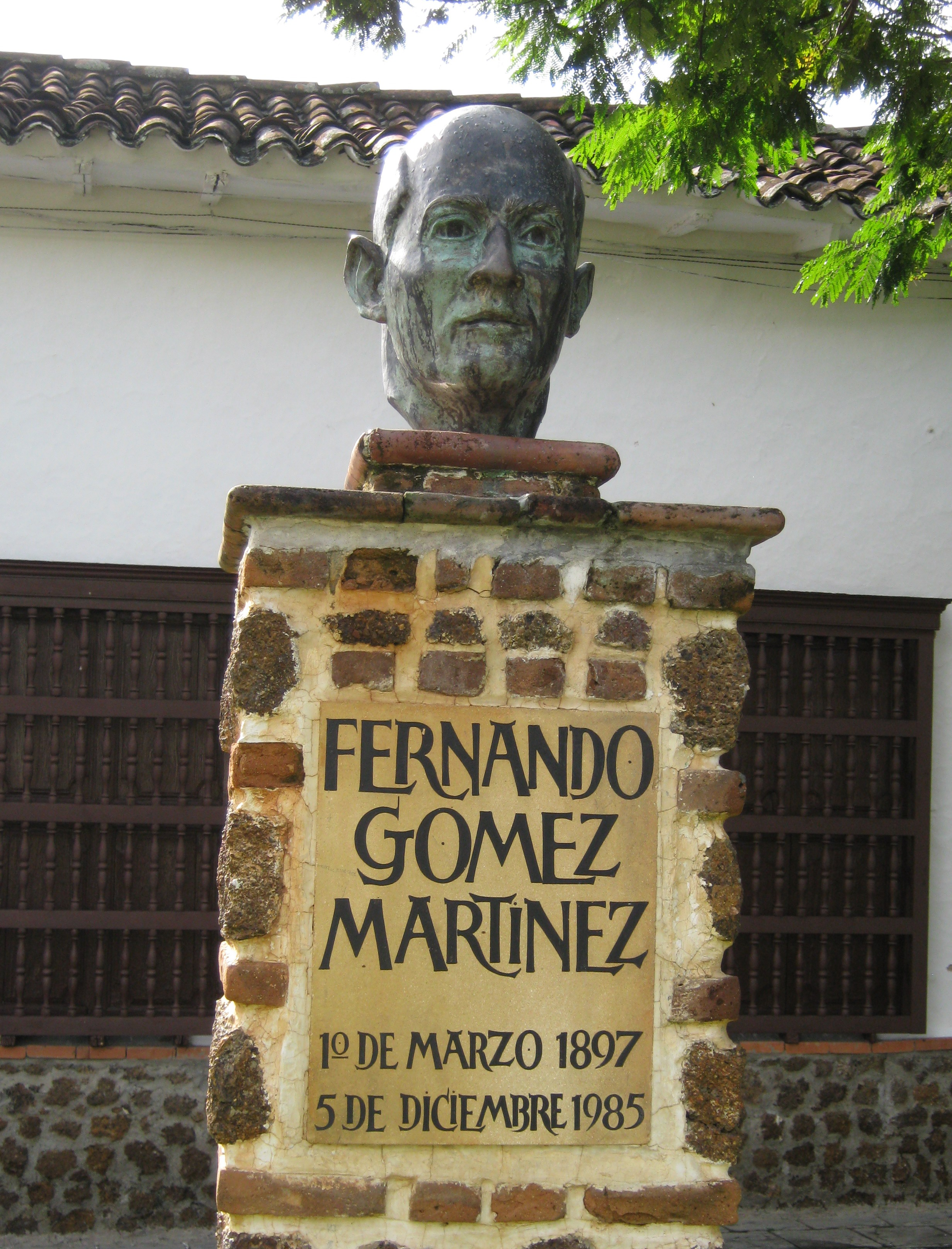
Fernando Gómez Martínez

Fernando Gómez Martínez (1 March 1897 – 5 December 1985) was a moderate Colombian Conservative Party member, newspaper editor, former Governor of Antioquia Department, and Foreign Minister.
