= Eduardo Zuleta Ángel =

Eduardo Zuleta Ángel (Note: In this Hispanic American name, the first or paternal surname is Zuleta and the second or maternal family name is Ángel.) (September 12, 1899 – September 12, 1973) was a diplomat, academic, educator, and politician who was a member of the Colombian Conservative Party and a moderate ospinista.

He served in various roles in the ministries of government, education, war, and foreign relations during the government of Mariano Ospina Pérez.

== Biography ==
Eduardo Zuleta Ángel was born in Barcelona, Spain, on September 12, 1899. His father was Eduardo Zuleta Gaviria, a Colombian politician.

During the administration of Alfonso López Pumarejo, he was elected as Magnistrate of the Civil Chamber of the Supreme Court of Justice for the period that began on May 1, 1935. In the Pérez administration, he served as the Minister of Government, Minister of Foreign Relations, and Minister of War and Education.

He also served as Ambassador to the United States during the government of Laureano Gómez, where he was appointed Chairman of the Preparatory Commission for the First session of the United Nations General Assembly.

He was a professor at the Universidad of the Andes (Colombia) in 1952 and 1953.

He died in 1973 in Miami, United States.
