= Eduardo Restrepo Sáenz =

Colombian lawyer and historian

2nd Ambassador of Colombia to Peru
- In office 4 April 1940 – 17 January 1941
- President: Eduardo Santos Montejo
- Preceded by: Roberto Urdaneta Arbeláez
- Succeeded by: Francisco José Chaux Ferrer

Colombian Minister of Foreign Affairs
- In office 8 Juney 1925 – 7 August 1926
- President: Pedro Nel Ospina Vázquez
- Preceded by: Jorge Vélez
- Succeeded by: Marco Fidel Suárez

Colombian Minister of Public Instruction
- In office 19 September 1921 – 11 November 1921
- President: Marco Fidel Suárez
- Preceded by: Miguel Abadía Méndez
- Succeeded by: Alfredo Vásquez Cobo

Governor of Cundinamarca
- In office 1 October 1918 – 30 September 1921
- President: Marco Fidel Suárez
- Preceded by: Jorge González García
- Succeeded by: Eduardo Briceño Díaz

Personal details
- Born: 5 August 1886 Bogotá, Cundinamarca, Colombia
- Died: 17 October 1955 (aged 69) Bogotá, Cundinamarca, Colombia
- Spouse: Elvira del Corral Castellanos (1899-her death)
- Relations: José Manuel Restrepo Veléz (great grandfather)
- Children: Elvira Restrepo del Corral; Ana Restrepo del Corral; Leonor Restrepo del Corral; Eduardo Restrepo del Corral; María Restrepo del Corral
- Education: Our Lady of the Rosary University (LLB); National University of Colombia (LLD)
- Profession: Lawyer

Eduardo Restrepo Sáenz (5 August 1886 – 17 October 1955) was a Colombian lawyer and historian, he served as the 2nd Colombian Ambassador to Peru as well as Minister of Foreign Affairs, Minister of Public Instruction, and Governor of the Department of Cundinamarca. He was also a founding member and president of the Colombian Academy of History.

== Ambassadorship in Peru ==
In 1940, President Eduardo Santos Montejo named Restrepo Ambassador Extraordinary and Plenipotentiary of Colombia to Peru replacing Roberto Urdaneta Arbeláez. On 4 April 1940, Restrepo officially presented his Letters of Credence to President Manuel Prado y Ugarteche, but presented his resignation later that year being replaced by Francisco José Chaux Ferrer on 17 January 1941.

== Personal life ==
He was born on 5 August 1886 in Bogotá, Colombia to José Ruperto Restrepo Montoya and María Teresa Justa Germana Ramona Sáenz Montoya. His paternal grandparents were José Manuel Restrepo Veléz and Mariana Montoya y Zapata, his maternal grandparents were José María Montoya Duque and María Josefa Zapata Ossa. He married Elvira del Corral Castellanos on 18 September 1899 and together had five children: Elvira, Ana, Leonor, Eduardo, and María.

== See also ==
- Domingo Esguerra Plata
- Leopoldo Borda Roldan
