= Víctor Mosquera Chaux =

Colombian politician (1919–1997)

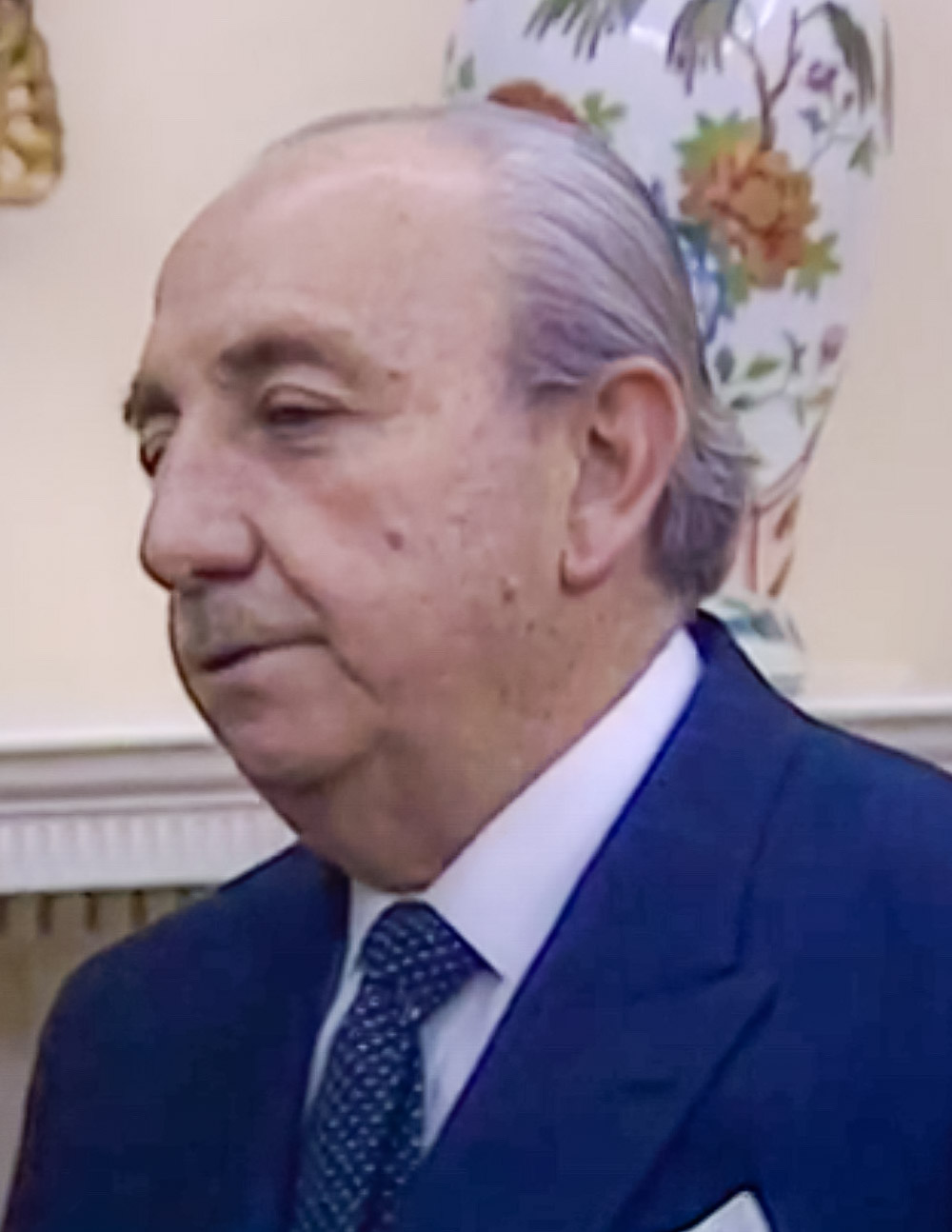

24th Colombia Ambassador to the United States
- In office 21 December 1987 – 25 November 1990
- President: Virgilio Barco Vargas
- Preceded by: Francisco Posada de La Peña
- Succeeded by: Jaime García Parra

10th Colombia Ambassador to the United Kingdom
- In office 3 June 1967 – 21 April 1970
- President: Carlos Lleras Restrepo
- Preceded by: Alfredo Araújo Grau
- Succeeded by: Camilo de Brigard Silva

Governor of Cauca
- In office 4 February 1959 – 11 July 1960
- President: Alberto Lleras Camargo
- Preceded by: Francisco Lemos Arboleda
- Succeeded by: Miguel Ángel Zúñiga

Senator of Colombia
- In office 20 July 1970 – 20 July 1974
- In office 20 July 1962 – 3 June 1967
- In office 20 July 1958 – 4 February 1959

Member of the Colombian Chamber of Representatives
- In office 20 July 1947 – 9 November 1949
- Constituency: Cauca Department

Personal details
- Born: 1 October 1919 Popayán, Cauca, Colombia
- Died: 5 November 1997 (aged 78) Bogotá, D.C., Colombia
- Resting place: Templo de San Francisco; Popayán, Cauca, Colombia
- Party: Liberal
- Spouse: Cecilia Paz Salazar
- Children: Olga Lucía Mosquera Paz
- Education: University of Cauca
- Profession: Lawyer

Víctor Mosquera Chaux (October 1, 1919 – November 5, 1997) was a Colombian lawyer and diplomat. A Liberal party politician, he served as Councilman of Popayán, Assemblymean of Cauca, Chamber Representative for Cauca, Senator of Colombia, and Governor of Cauca. He also served as Ambassador of Colombia to the United States, and Ambassador of Colombia to the United Kingdom.

In February 1981, Mosquera held executive power for eight days as Presidential Designate, while President Julio César Turbay Ayala was indisposed for health reasons.
