= Diego Uribe Vargas =

Colombian politician (1931–2022)

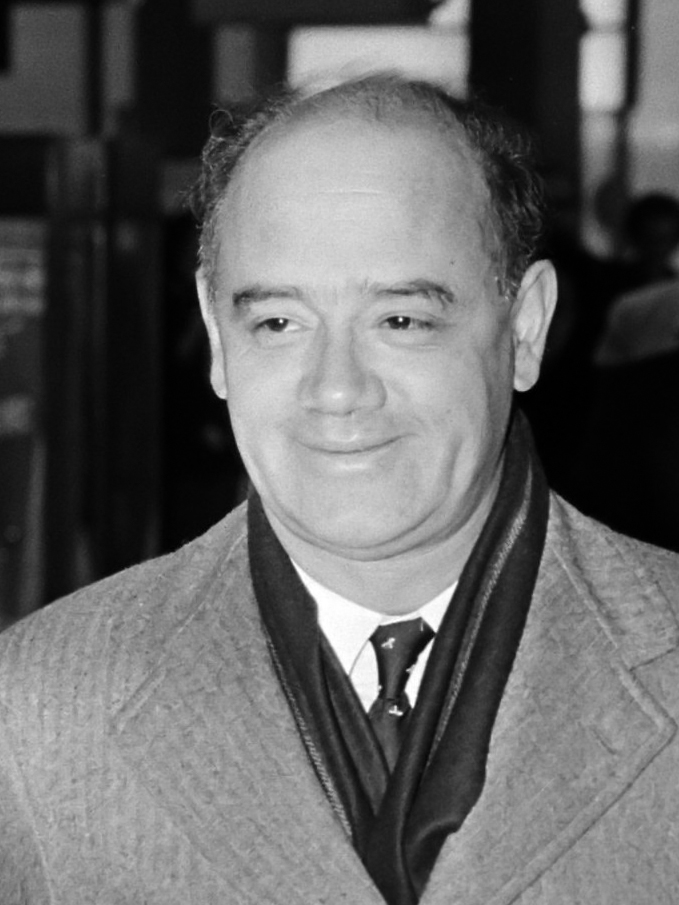
- Uribe in 1981

Minister of Foreign Affairs
- In office 1978–1981
- Preceded by: Indalecio Liévano
- Succeeded by: Carlos Lemos Simmonds

Personal details
- Born: 1 November 1931; Bogotá, Colombia
- Died: 12 August 2022 (aged 90); Bogotá, Colombia
- Political party: PLC
- Education: Del Rosario University
- Occupation: Diplomat

Diego Uribe Vargas (1 November 1931 – 12 August 2022) was a Colombian diplomat and politician. A member of the Colombian Liberal Party, he served as Minister of Foreign Affairs from 1978 to 1981.

Uribe died in Bogotá on 12 August 2022, at the age of 90.
