= Preparatory Commission of the United Nations =

Historical body of the United Nations

The Preparatory Commission of the United Nations (PCUN) was a temporary UN body established in June 1945 to organize the practical implementation of the newly adopted Charter of the United Nations before the organization formally came into existence on 24 October 1945.
