= Zuleta =

Zuleta is a surname. Notable people with the surname include:

- Carmen Zuleta (born 1947), Venezuelan judge
- Emiliano Zuleta (1912–2005), Colombian vallenato composer, accordion player, and singer
- Erasmo Zuleta (born 1989), Colombian politician and business administrator
- Estanislao Zuleta (1935–1990), Colombian philosopher, writer, and professor
- Francisco Moreno Zuleta (1880–1963), Spanish nobleman, lawyer, and politician
- Humberto Rubalcaba Zuleta (born 1943), Mexican attorney and rock music impresario
- Isaac Zuleta (born 2003), American footballer
- Julio Zuleta (born 1975), Panamanian baseball player
- León Zuleta (1952–1993), Colombian professor, writer, philosopher, journalist, and LGBT activist
- Luis Zuleta (born 1974), Colombian footballer
- Marcelo Zuleta (born 1964), Argentine football manager
- Mateo Zuleta (born 2002), Colombian footballer
