= Gabriel Turbay =

Colombian politician and physician (1901–1947)

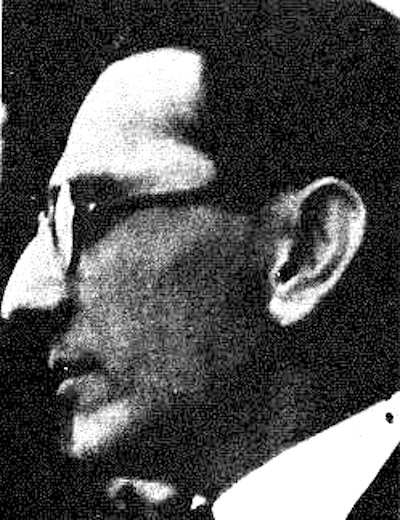
- Born: January 10, 1901; Bucaramanga, Colombia
- Died: November 17, 1947 (aged 46); Paris, France
- Other name: El Turco (lit. ' The Turk')
- Education: National University of Colombia
- Occupation: Politician
- Political party: Colombian Liberal Party
- Parent(s): Juan Turbay; Barbara Abinader

Gabriel Turbay Abinader (10 January 1901 – 17 November 1947) was a Colombian politician of Lebanese descent. He was a Congressman, Senator, and Foreign Minister in the 1930s. He served as Colombia's Ambassador to the United States from 1939 to 1945. He was an unsuccessful candidate for president in 1946.

== Early life ==
Gabriel Turbay was born on 10 January 1901, in Bucaramanga, Colombia. His parents, Juan Turbay and Barbara Abinader, were immigrants from Lebanon.

Turbay earned a PhD in Medicine and Surgery from the National University of Colombia.

== Career ==
Turbay began his career as a physician in his hometown of Bucaramanga.

Turbay joined the Colombian Liberal Party. He served as a member of the House of Representatives from 1927 to 1934, and the Senate from 1934 to 1937.

Turbay served as the Foreign Minister of Colombia from 1937 to 1938. He then served as Colombia's Ambassador to the United States from 1939 to 1945. He was opposed to the creation of Israel.

While serving in his cabinet, President Alfonso López Pumarejo called Turbay "El Turco" (lit. 'The Turk'), a nickname that would follow him throughout his political career, sometimes in an attempt to otherize him.

In 1946, he unsuccessfully ran for president.

== Death ==
Turbay died on 17 November 1947, in Paris, France.
