= José María Campo Serrano =

Colombian lawyer and politician (1832-1915)

José María Campo
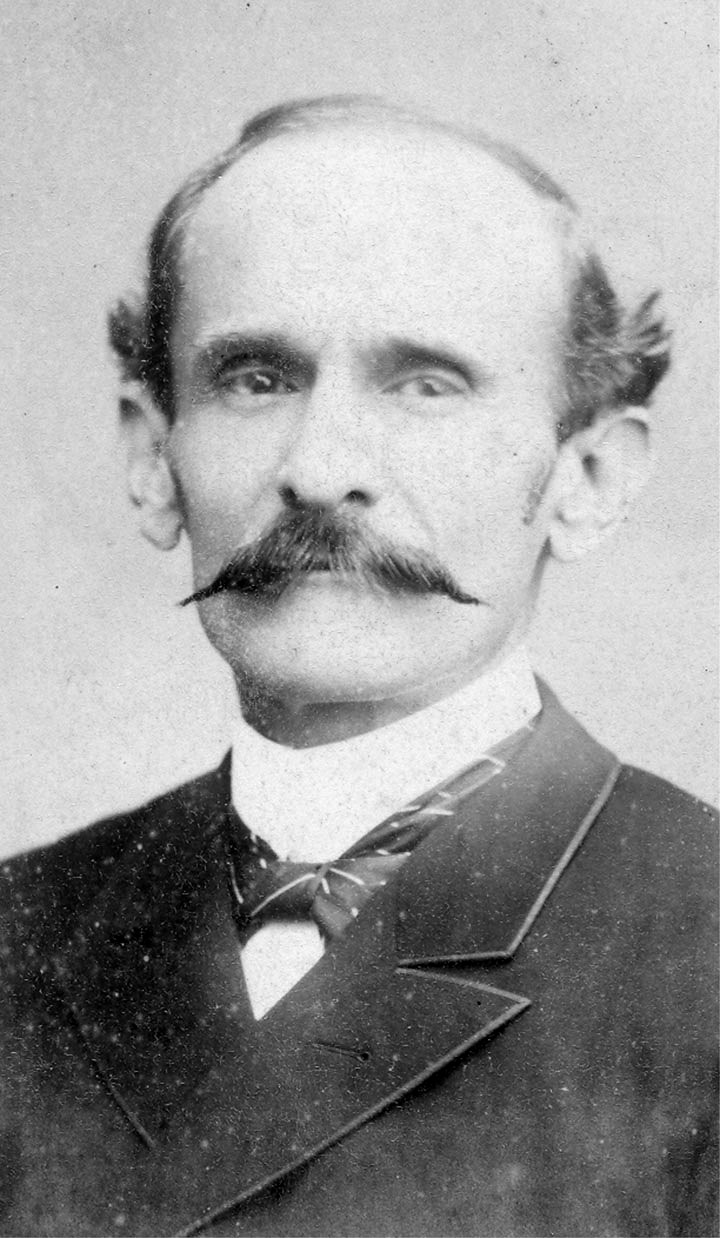
- Campo Serrano c., 1890

1st President of Colombia
- In office 5 August 1886 – 7 January 1887
- Vice President: Vacant
- Preceded by: Rafael Núñez
- Succeeded by: Eliseo Payán

Presidential Designate
- In office 10 December 1885 – 5 August 1886
- President: Rafael Núñez
- Preceded by: Position established
- Succeeded by: Carlos Holguín Mallarino

Second Presidential Designate of the United States of Colombia
- In office 15 March 1884 – 9 December 1885 Serving with Ezequiel Hurtado and Pedro J. Sarmiento
- President: Rafael Núñez
- Preceded by: Daniel Aldana
- Succeeded by: Position abolished

12th and 17th President of the Sovereign State of Magdalena
- In office 1879–1884
- Preceded by: Luis Antonio Robles Suárez
- Succeeded by: M.S. Ramón

19th President of the Sovereign State of Antioquia
- In office 12 March 1885 – 21 September 1885- (Note: Served as Acting president between 1 April–5 August 1886)
- Preceded by: Luciano Restrepo Escobar
- Succeeded by: Marceliano Vélez Barreneche

Governor of Panama
- In office January 1900 – June 1900
- Preceded by: Facundo Mutis Durán
- Succeeded by: Alejandro Orillac

Personal details
- Born: 8 September 1832 Santa Marta, Magdalena, Republic of New Granada
- Died: 24 February 1915 (aged 82) Santa Marta, Magdalena, Colombia
- Party: Conservative
- Spouse: Rosa Riascos (m. 1863; died 1914)
- Education: Seminario Conciliar de Santa Marta
- Occupation: Lawyer; militar; politician

José María Campo Serrano (8 September 1832 – 6 January 1915) was a Colombian lawyer, general, and statesman, who became President of Colombia after the resignation of the president and the dismissal of the vice president. He sanctioned the Constitution of 1886 that created the Republic of Colombia proceeding the United States of Colombia. A Samarian Costeño, he became president of the Sovereign State of Magdalena, and Antioquia, Governor of Panama, and held various Ministries during his career as a politician.

== Early life and education ==
José María Campo was born on September 8, 1832, in Santa Marta, Magdalena in what was then the Republic of New Granada. He was the first child of Andrés del Campo and María Josefa Serrano, and brother of Juan Campo Serrano (who also signed the constitution of 1886 as the delegate of the state of Bolivar). He completed his studies in the Seminario Conciliar de Santa Marta, and later attended the Colegio Provincial Santander, where he studied Law and Philosophy.

He was married to Rosa Riascos García.

== Political career ==
=== Magdalena ===
Campo started his political life in his home state of Magdalena. There he served various positions at different levels of government, he was a member of the legislative assembly of Magdalena, Prosecutor General, and member of the Chamber of Representatives and Senate of Colombia for Magdalena. He also served twice as President of the Sovereign State of Magdalena, first between 1871–1874, and from 1879–1884.

His administrations were focused mainly on the construction and expansion of railways to foment commerce and industry in the region and connect the country with the port, part of this goal was accomplished in 1881 when contracts were made to start the construction of a railroad to connect Santa Marta with El Banco.

=== Antioquia ===
During the Colombian Civil War of 1884-85 José María Campo served as Civil and Military Chief of the Sovereign State of Antioquia between March 14, and September 21 of 1885.

His administration's goal was to contain the civil insurgency and discourage political opposition. One way Campo did this was by redistricting some of electoral districts that favored the radical rebels, like the districts of La Unión and Pabón.

As in Magdalena, Campo was interested in the fomentation of railways, something he accomplished on August 18, 1885, when negotiations with the private sector were made to improve and expand the railways of Antioquia. General Campo left the Presidency of Antioquia to represent the Constituent Assembly in Bogotá.

=== Ministries ===
General Campo became an active member in the administrations of various presidents as a member of their Council of Ministers. The first post he had in these was in 1882 during the presidency of Francisco Javier Zaldúa, where he was Minister of Public Instruction in charge of national education, a post he got again on April 1, 1884, when Ezequiel Hurtado also made Campo his Minister of Public Instruction.

In the administration of Rafael Núñez, he worked in two ministries, the Ministry of War, in which he had to confront the Civil War of 1885, and the Ministry of Finance, which he left to go to Antioquia.

His last ministerial post was as Minister of Government during the presidency of Miguel Antonio Caro.

José María Campo Serrano

Minister of War
- In office April 1, 1884 – March 12, 1885
- President: Ezequiel Hurtado; Rafael Núñez
- Preceded by: Juan Mateus
- Succeeded by: Leopoldo Cuervo

Minister of Public Instruction
- In office April 1, 1884 – August 11, 1884
- President: Ezequiel Hurtado
- In office April 1, 1882 – December 21, 1882
- President: Francisco Javier Zaldúa

Ministry of Finance
- President: Rafael Núñez

Minister of Government
- President: Miguel Antonio Caro

== Presidency 1886–1887 ==
On December 9, 1885, the Constituent Assembly elected Rafael Núñez as president, Eliseo Payán as vice president, and José María Campo as designate. J.M. Campo came to power in a very unusual way; on March 30, 1886, president Núñez presented his resignation to Congress due to his poor health condition caused by dysentery. The vice president, as the next in line of succession, had many enemies in congress, and on May 4, Congress revoked Eliseo Payán of his position as vice president.

On April 1, 1886, with no vice president and the president resigning, the Presidential-designate José María Campo as the next in line to assume the executive power was sworn in as acting president of the United States of Colombia.

=== Policies ===
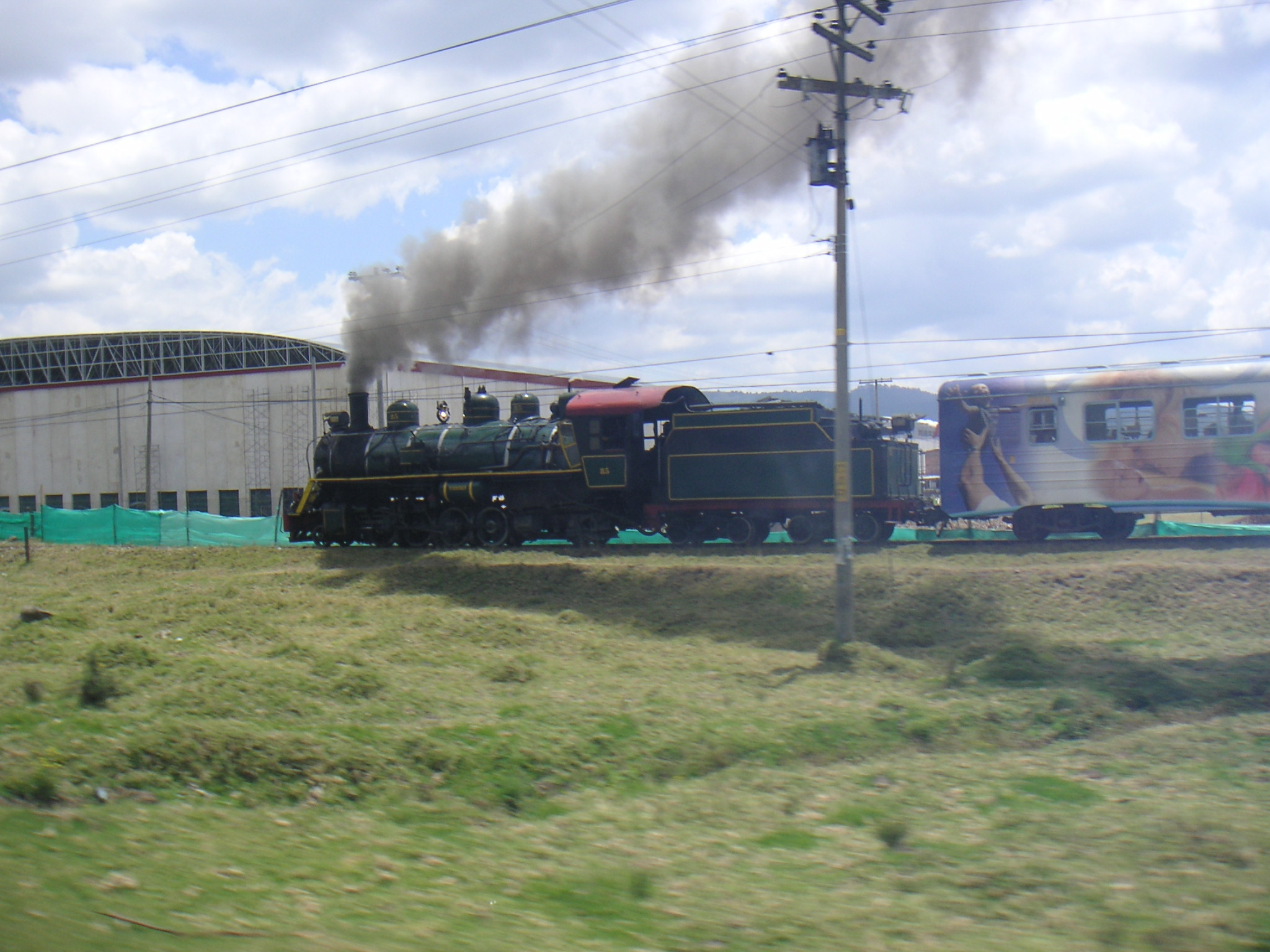
The Train of the Savanna, a project of President Campo.

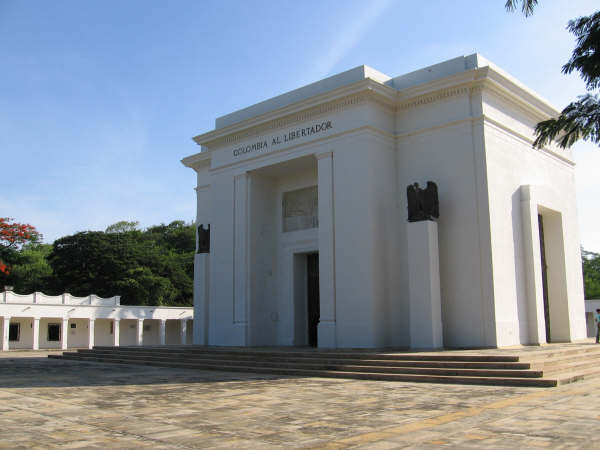
The National Pantheon, located in the Quinta de San Pedro Alejandrino

Of the short presidency of Campo some of the policies of importance that were made were more of a local impact than of large national impact policy. Some of the projects of his administration were the contracts for the installation and construction of public lighting and potable water services to Bogotá. He also continued advocating for rail transportation and railways, and in 1887 the Train of the Savanna started operating connecting Bogotá with the near cities of Facatativá and Zipaquirá, and it continues in service today.

One of the Decrees made by Campo as President of Colombia was in regards to the Quinta de San Pedro Alejandrino, the house where the Libertador Simón Bolívar died. The house was of private property and the owners had offered to sell it to the government, but for an outrageous amount of money. In an executive order in 1886, Campo seized the property and placed it under the administration of the Department of Magdalena to administer it.

Although he was allowed, Campo did not choose to live in the Palacio de San Carlos, the then Presidential Palace, opting to continue living at his normal residence.

=== Constitution of 1886 ===
The Constituent Assembly that was called in session in 1885 by Rafael Núñez to draft a new constitution passed its final resolution on August 4, 1886. The next day, President Campo and his Council of Ministers sanctioned the constitution, making it official and changing the name of the country to Republic of Colombia, and in so, Campo become its first president.

== Post-Presidency ==
The 1st President of the newly established Republic of Colombia, stepped down on January 6, 1887, ceding the power to Eliseo Payán, who in the absence of Núñez became acting president.

=== Panama ===
José María Campo was once again called into politics and war to go to Panama, where the Liberal rebels were fighting the Conservative government, as Panama was one of the stages of the Thousand Days War. Because of his political and military credentials he was named Governor of the Department of Panama, replacing the then governor, Facundo Mutis Durán, in January 1900.

Campo came in strong, he brought reinforcements to the region from different parts of the country, as by now the war was concentrating its efforts on Panama and the Caribbean Region. He used the strategic impact of railways to mobilize troops and clear adjacent areas.

The war however was getting more complicated, and General Campo had to leave to Barranquilla to buy weapons and bring reinforcements passing on the governorship to Alejandro Orillac as acting governor. Although General Campo’s leave cause an intensification of the rebel forces, the war came to an end in 1902, cementing the way for the separation of Panama from Colombia.

== Death and legacy ==
José María Campo died in his home in Santa Marta on February 24, 1915, at the age of 82.

He is considered by many as the most influential Samarian in history. His most enduring legacy by far was the Constitution of 1886, which was the country's fundamental law for almost 105 years, until it was replaced by the Constitution of 1991.

Living relatives, Consuelo Mejia Campo & Maria Victoria Mejia Campo.

== See also ==
- Colombian Constitution of 1886
- Thousand Days War
- United States of Colombia

== Notes ==
Political offices
Preceded by Daniel Aldana	Second Presidential Designate of the United States of Colombia; 1886	Position abolished
Position established	Presidential Designate of Colombia; 1886-1887	Succeeded by Carlos Holguín Mallarino
