= Francisco Pereira Martínez =

Colombian lawyer

José Francisco Ramón Vicente Pablo Pereira Martínez (January 11, 1783 - August 20, 1863) was a Colombian lawyer. The city of Pereira is named after him. He was a government minister in the government of the Republic of New Granada.
