= Joaquín Riascos =

Colombian General and politician (1833–1875)

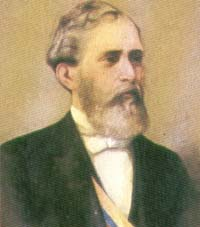
- 1912 Oil Painting by unknown artist

5th President of the United States of Colombia
- In office May 12, 1867 – June 28, 1867
- Preceded by: Tomás Cipriano de Mosquera
- Succeeded by: Santos Acosta

14th President of the Sovereign State of Magdalena
- In office 1875 – August 8, 1875
- Preceded by: José Ignacio Diaz Granados
- Succeeded by: Manuel Davila García

8th President of the Sovereign State of Magdalena
- In office April 24, 1867 – 1868
- Preceded by: Tomás Abello
- Succeeded by: José Ignacio Diaz Granados

Personal details
- Born: Manuel Joaquín de Santa Isabel Riascos García; November 9, 1833 La Chorrera, Panamá, New Granada
- Died: August 8, 1875 (aged 41) San Juan del Cesar, Magdalena, United States of Colombia
- Party: Liberal
- Spouse: Concepción Jimeno Munive
- Occupation: Soldier (General), politician

Military service
- Allegiance: Colombian Liberal Party
- Rank: General
- Battles/wars: Colombian Civil War (1860–1862)

Manuel Joaquín Riascos García (November 9, 1833 – August 8, 1875) was a Colombian General and politician who became acting President in rebellion of the United States of Colombia in 1867 for 45 days.
