= Minister of Foreign Affairs (Colombia) =

Minister of the Government of Colombia

Minister of Foreign Affairs of Colombia
- Incumbent; Omar Bula since 7 August 2026
- Council of Ministers; Ministry of Foreign Affairs
- Style: Mr. Minister (informal); Chancellor (local); The Honorable (formal); His Excellency (diplomatic)
- Member of: Government of Colombia; Executive Branch
- Reports to: President of Colombia with Senate
- Seat: Bogota, D.C.
- Appointer: President of Colombia
- Precursor: Secretary of Foreign Affairs
- Formation: October 7, 1821; 204 years ago
- First holder: Pedro Gual Escandón as Secretary of Foreign Affairs
- Succession: None
- Deputy: Deputy Minister of Foreign Affairs and Deputy Minister of Multilateral Affairs
- Salary: Executive Schedule, COP$226,965,457,533 (2012); COP$234,237,000,000 (2013); COP$268,566,000,000 (2014)

The Minister of Foreign Affairs (Spanish: Ministro de Relaciones Exteriores), informally known as Chancellor (Canciller), is a member of the executive branch of the national government of Colombia and head of the Ministry of Foreign Affairs of Colombia. The incumbent is one of the highest-ranking members of the president's cabinet and ranks fifth in Colombian line of presidential succession among cabinet ministers.

Created in 1821 with Pedro Gual Escandón as its first office holder, the Minister of Foreign Affairs represents Colombia to foreign countries and is therefore considered analogous to a Chancellor in other countries. The Minister of Foreign Affairs is appointed by the President of Colombia and serves at his discretion, defending the respective interests of the presidential administration. The Minister of Foreign Affairs, along with the Minister of the Interior, the Minister of Finance, the Minister of Justice and the Minister of Defense, are generally considered the five most important cabinet members due to the importance of their respective ministries.

== Duties and responsibilities ==
The stated duties of the Minister of Foreign Affairs are to oversee Colombia's foreign service and immigration policy and to manage the Ministry of Foreign Affairs. The minister must also advise the president on Colombian foreign affairs, such as the appointment of diplomats and ambassadors, informing the president about the removal and revocation of these people. The minister of foreign affairs can conduct negotiations, interpret and rescind treaties related to foreign policy. The minister can also participate in international conferences, organizations and agencies as a representative of Colombia. The minister communicates matters related to Colombia's foreign policy to Congress and citizens. The ministry also provides services to Colombian citizens living or traveling abroad, such as providing credentials in the form of passports. By doing this, the minister also ensures the protection of citizens, their property and interests in foreign countries.

Foreign ministers also have internal responsibilities. Most of the historic internal functions of the Ministry of Foreign Affairs were gradually transferred to other agencies in the late 20th century as part of various administrative reforms and restructuring. Those that remain include the performance of protocol functions for the Casa de Nariño and the writing of certain proclamations. The minister also negotiates with individual states on the extradition of fugitives to foreign countries. According to national law, the powers that he can exercise and that the president grants him are not codified. Consequently, several foreign ministers have served as acting presidents during the president's absence.

As the highest-ranking member of the cabinet, the Minister of Foreign Affairs is the fourth highest-ranking official in the executive branch of the national government of Colombia, after the president, the vice president and the minister of the interior, and is third in line to succeed the presidency, after the vice president. and the minister of the interior, only being applied in the case that the minister belongs to the same party or political movement of the original president.

Ten former foreign ministers – Concha, Suárez, Holguín, Olaya Herrera, Santos Montejo, Gómez, Urdaneta, Lleras Camargo, Valencia, López Michelsen and Turbay Ayala – have gone on to be elected president. Others, including Noemí Sanín, Carlos Holmes Trujillo and Marta Lucía Ramírez have also campaigned as presidential candidates, before or since . after his tenure as Foreign Minister, but were ultimately unsuccessful. Therefore, the position of Foreign Minister has been considered a consolation prize for unsuccessful presidential candidates.
