= Santos Acosta =

Colombian General and political figure

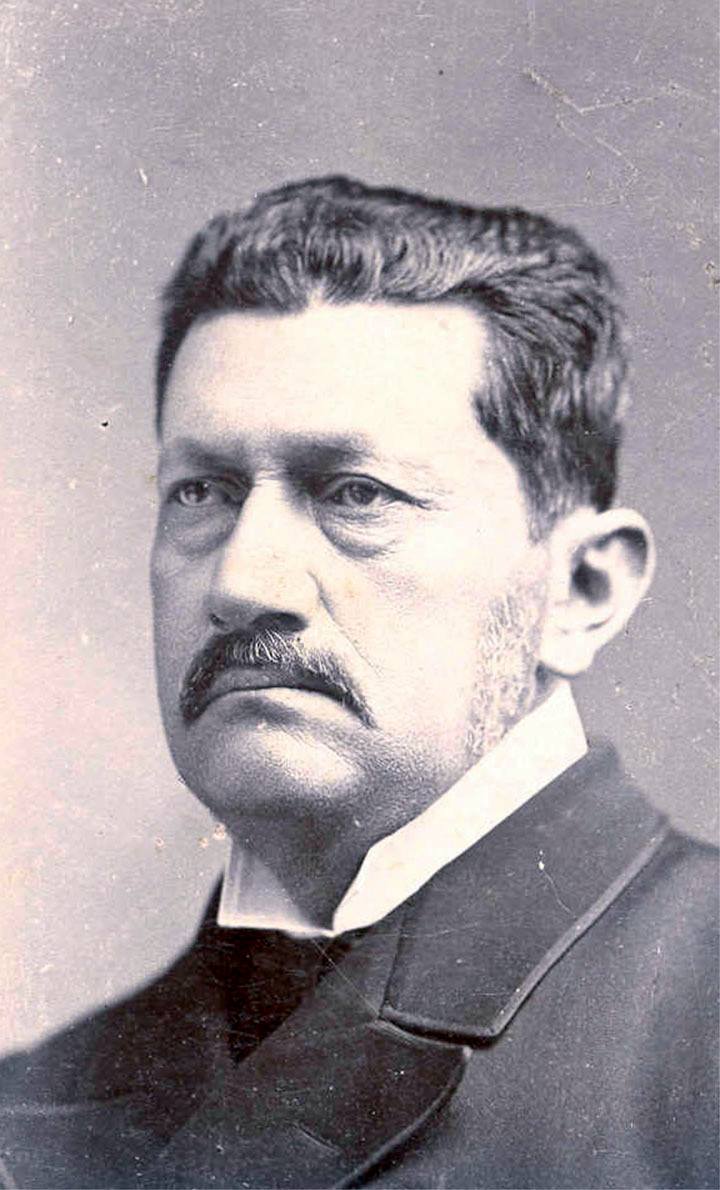

6th President of the United States of Colombia
- In office May 23, 1867 – April 1, 1868
- Preceded by: Tomás Cipriano de Mosquera
- Succeeded by: Santos Gutiérrez

8th President of the Sovereign State of Boyacá
- In office 1866–1868
- Preceded by: Sergio Camargo
- Succeeded by: Aníbal Correa

Personal details
- Born: Manuel María de los Santos Acosta Castillo; November 1, 1828 Miraflores, Boyacá, Gran Colombia
- Died: January 9, 1901 (aged 72) Bogotá, Colombia
- Party: Liberal
- Spouse: Carlota Larrota Castañeda
- Education: Our Lady of the Rosary University
- Occupation: Physician, soldier (General), politician, rector
- Profession: Physician

Military service
- Allegiance: Colombia (Liberal Party)
- Branch/service: National Army of Colombia
- Years of service: 1854–1876
- Rank: General
- Commands: Army Chief of Staff
- Battles/wars: Colombian Civil War of 1854; Colombian Civil War 1860–1862; Colombian Civil War of 1876

Manuel María de los Santos Acosta Castillo (November 1, 1828 – January 9, 1901) was a Colombian General and political figure. He served as the president of Colombia from 1867 until 1868.

== Biographic data ==
Acosta was born in Miraflores, Boyacá, on November 1, 1828. He died in Bogotá on January 9, 1901.

== Political career ==
Although Acosta studied and graduated in medicine, he did not practice this profession. Rather, he pursued military and political careers. He was elected several times as MP, both to the House of Representatives and the Senate. Santos Acosta was one of the main players during the constitutional reform of 1853.

In 1867, Congress elected Acosta as second Vice-President. Congress had also elected Santos Gutiérrez as first Vice-President and Joaquín Riascos as third Vice-President.

He succeeded to the role of president after Tomás Cipriano de Mosquera was deposed in 1867 and held the position until 1868.

== Sources ==
- Santos Acosta at virtualology.com
