= Guillermo Quintero Calderón =

Colombian politician (1832–1919)

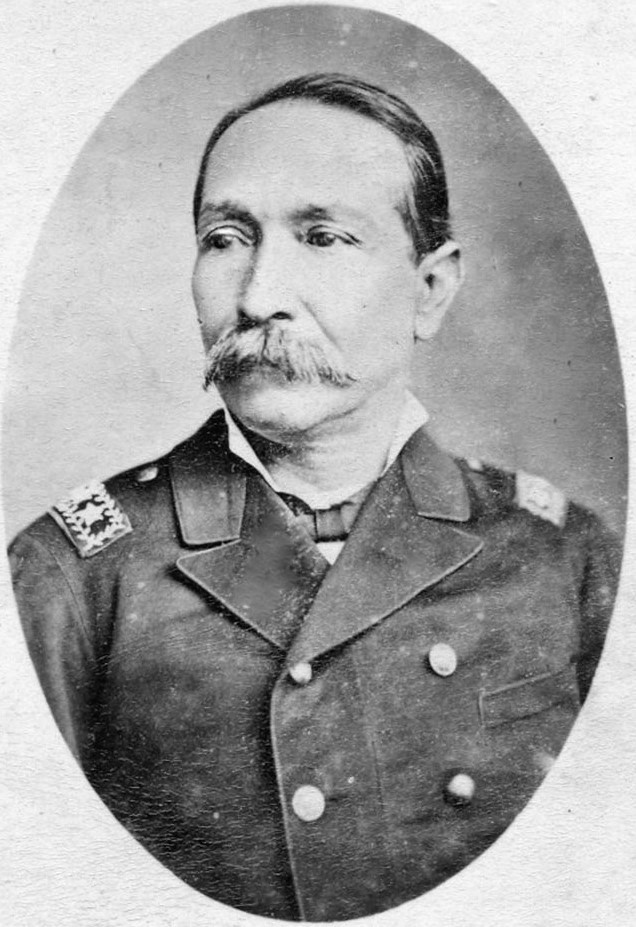
- Guillermo Quintero Calderón, 1904.
- Born: 1832; Puente Nacional
- Died: 1919 (aged 86–87); Quintero
- Military career
- Allegiance: Colombia
- Rank: General
- Other work: Soldier and politician

Guillermo Quintero Calderón (Puente Nacional, 3 February 1832 – Quintero, Chile, 14 February 1919) was a Colombian soldier, writer, politician and member of the Colombian Conservative Party.

== Biography ==
He began his military career fighting the dictatorship of José María Melo under command of former President Tomás Cipriano de Mosquera during the Colombian Civil War of 1854. He reached the rank of General after having participated in several civil wars, gaining his most important victory in the Battle of La Humareda during the Colombian Civil War of 1884–1885.

Subsequently he began a political career, becoming Governor of Santander in 1888. He became Presidential Designate between 1894 and 1896, and was acting President of Colombia for 5 days in 1896.
