= Euclídes de Angulo =

Colombian politician (1841–1917)

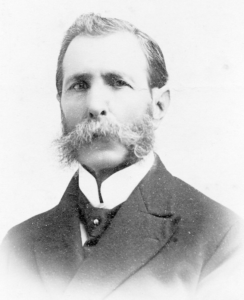
- de Angulo c. 1908

Minister of Treasury
- In office 14 April 1908 – 14 April 1909
- President: Rafael Reyes
- Preceded by: Ricardo Restrepo
- Succeeded by: Baldomero Sanín-Cano

Minister of Government
- In office 28 August 1906 – 9 March 1908
- President: Rafael Reyes
- Preceded by: Dionisio Arango
- Succeeded by: Francisco José Urrutia

Minister of War
- In office 23 April 1906 – 31 May 1906
- President: Rafael Reyes
- Preceded by: Clímaco Losada
- Succeeded by: Manuel María Castro
- In office 25 September 1905 – 8 January 1906
- President: Rafael Reyes
- Preceded by: Manuel María Castro
- Succeeded by: Manuel María Sanclemente

Personal details
- Born: Diego Euclídes de Angulo Lemos; 12 November 1841 Popayán, Cauca, New Granada
- Died: 14 February 1917 (aged 75) Funza, Cundinamarca, Colombia
- Party: Conservative
- Spouse: Adelaida Bucheli
- Profession: Lawyer; journalist; politician

Military service
- Allegiance: Conservative
- Branch/service: Army
- Rank: Colonel
- Battles/wars: Colombian Civil War (1860–1862); Colombian Civil War of 1876

Euclídes de Angulo (12 November 1841 – 14 February 1917) was a Colombian politician, prosecutor, lawyer, and military officer who served as Minister of Treasury from 1908 to 1909 under President Rafael Reyes. A member of the Conservative party, he also served as Minister of Government and Minister of War twice.

Born in Popayán, Cauca, de Angulo was the brother of Sofía de Angulo de Reyes, wife of President Rafael Reyes.
