= Eustorgio Salgar =

Colombian lawyer, general and political figure

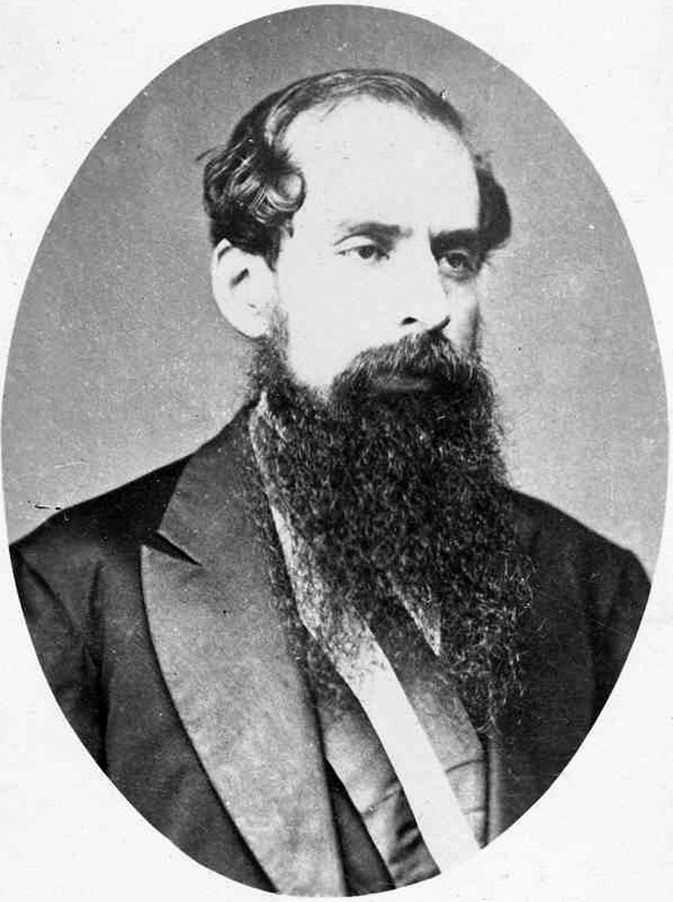
- Portrait, c. 1863

10th President of the United States of Colombia
- In office April 1, 1870 – April 1, 1872
- Preceded by: Santos Gutiérrez
- Succeeded by: Manuel Murillo Toro

Presiding Member of the Provisional Executive Ministry of the Colombia
- In office February 9, 1863 – May 14, 1863 Serving with Santos Gutiérrez, José Hilario López, Froilan Largacha, Tomás Cipriano de Mosquera
- Preceded by: Provisionary Office*
- Succeeded by: Provisionary Office*

Vice President of the Rionegro Convention
- In office February 4, 1863 – May 8, 1863
- President: Francisco Javier Zaldúa
- Constituency: Federal District

35th President of the Sovereign State of Cundinamarca
- In office January 1, 1874 – December 31, 1875
- Preceded by: Julio Barriga V.
- Succeeded by: Jacobo Sánchez

21st President of the Sovereign State of Santander
- In office October 1, 1868 – March 14, 1870
- Preceded by: Narciso Cadena Uribe
- Succeeded by: Narciso Cadena Uribe

16th President of the Sovereign State of Santander
- In office August 11, 1861 – June 6, 1864
- Preceded by: Pedro Quintero Jácome
- Succeeded by: Rafael Otero Navarro

7th President of the Sovereign State of Santander
- In office April 3, 1859 – November 23, 1859
- Preceded by: Evaristo Azuero
- Succeeded by: Ulpiano Valenzuela

Personal details
- Born: Eustorgio Salgar Moreno; November 1, 1831 Bogotá, Cundinamarca, Republic of New Granada
- Died: November 25, 1885 (aged 54) Bogotá, Cundinamarca, United States of Colombia
- Party: Liberal
- Spouse: Sinforosa Florez Mateus
- Relations: Consuelo Salgar de Montejo
- Education: National University of Colombia
- Occupation: Soldier (General), politician
- Profession: Jurisprudence
- This was a provisional office position. See the preceding executive office's officeholder Francisco Javier Zaldúa, and the replacing executive office's officeholder Tomás Cipriano de Mosquera.

Eustorgio Salgar Moreno Salazar (1 November 1831 – 25 November 1885) was a Colombian lawyer, general and political figure, who was president of the United States of Colombia from 1870 until 1872. Elected at age 39, he was the youngest president of Colombia.

== Biographic data ==
Salgar was born in Bogotá, Cundinamarca, on November 1, 1831. He died in the same city, on November 25, 1885.

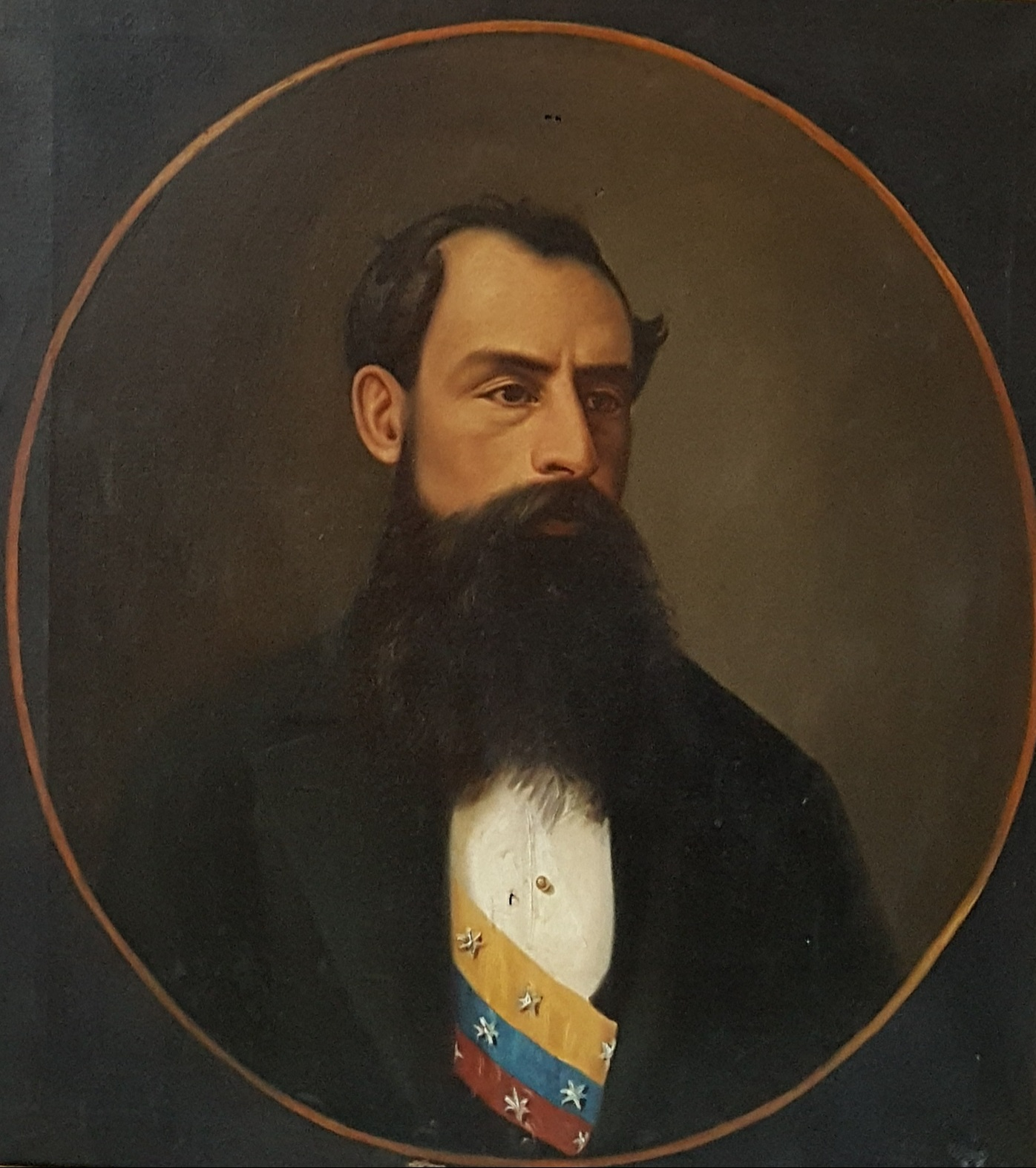
Presidential Canvas. Eustorgio Salgar. Private Collection Montejo Family.

== Early life ==
Salgar attended what later became the National University of Colombia, where he studied jurisprudence. In 1851, at the age of 20, he obtained his law degree.

== Political career ==
He became the governor of the Garcia Rovira province in 1853, and, when it was merged with Pamplona in 1855, he assumed the new role of governor of the newly combined province until 1858. During that year, Salgar was a member of the briefly lived Granadine Confederation's senate and a year later became governor of the Sovereign State of Santander.

== Military career ==
In 1859, Salgar enlisted in the army of General Tomás Cipriano de Mosquera during the liberal uprising and the war against President Mariano Ospina Rodríguez. Salgar was captured in combat and tried for the insurgency. He was incarcerated until March 31, 1861, when General Mosquera took Bogotá.

== Diplomatic career ==
Following his term as president, Salgar was appointed as ambassador to the United States of America until 1867.

== Presidency ==
During the presidential election of 1870, the radical wing of the liberal party nominated Salgar as its candidate. The historical wing of the liberal party nominated General Tomás Cipriano de Mosquera. Salgar obtained the majority of the popular vote and was elected president for the two-years term. He was inaugurated on April 1, 1870. During his brief presidency, he founded and promoted the country's first railway company and the first corporation intended to provide social security.
