= Carlos Holguín Mallarino =

President of Colombia from 1888 to 1892

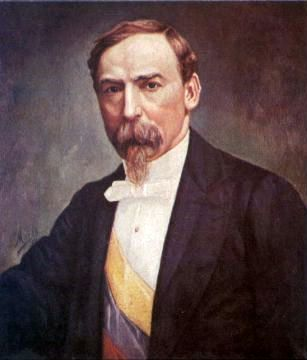
- Oil painting by Ricardo Moros Urbina.

2nd President of Colombia
- In office 7 August 1888 – 7 August 1892
- Vice President: Vacant (Note: Holguín was the presidential designate during the government of Rafael Núñez and assumed the presidency after Núñez's resignation on 7 August 1892, having received more votes from the Council of Delegates than Eliseo Payán. This was before the convening of the National Constituent Assembly in 1904, where a vacancy in the office of vice president remained unfilled until the subsequent elections and inauguration.)
- Preceded by: Rafael Núñez
- Succeeded by: Rafael Núñez

Presidential Designate
- In office 4 June 1887 – 7 August 1888
- President: Rafael Núñez
- Preceded by: José María Campo Serrano
- Succeeded by: Leonardo Canal

Minister of Foreign Affairs
- In office 4 June 1887 – 7 August 1888
- President: Rafael Núñez
- Preceded by: Felipe Angulo Bustillo
- Succeeded by: Antonio Roldán Betancourt

Secretary of Foreign Affairs
- In office 20 January 1877 – 9 February 1877
- President: Aquileo Parra Gómez
- Preceded by: Carlos Nicolás Rodríguez
- Succeeded by: Eustorgio Salgar Moreno

Magistrate of the Supreme Court
- In office 1859–1880

Personal details
- Born: Carlos María Holguín Mallarino; 11 July 1832 Nóvita, Chocó, New Granada
- Died: 19 October 1894 (aged 62) Bogotá, Cundinamarca, Colombia
- Party: Conservative
- Other political affiliations: National Party
- Spouse: Margarita Caro Tovar
- Relations: Manuel María Mallarino (uncle); Jorge Holguín (brother); Miguel Antonio Caro (brother-in-law)
- Education: Colegio San Bartolomé
- Profession: Lawyer; journalist; politician

Military service
- Allegiance: Conservative Party
- Branch/service: Army
- Rank: Colonel
- Battles/wars: Colombian Civil War (1860–1862); Colombian Civil War of 1876

Carlos María Holguín Mallarino (11 July 1832 – 19 October 1894) was a Colombian lawyer, journalist, and politician, who became President of Colombia between 1888 and 1892, acting in the absence of President Rafael Núñez.

== Biographic data ==
Carlos Holguín Mallarino was born on 11 July 1832, in the town of Nóvita, Chocó when the region was still part of the department (state) of Cauca. He died in Bogotá on 19 October 1894 while he was serving in Congress as senator. Carlos Holguín Mallarino was part of the prominent Holguín, Mallarino and Caro Families. Both his uncle Manuel María Mallarino and his brother, Jorge Holguín, were Presidents of Colombia, as was his brother-in-law Miguel Antonio Caro, who succeeded him in office.

== Early life ==
Holguín completed his first years of education in the city of Cali, Valle. He then traveled to Bogotá, where he studied jurisprudence and obtained a degree in law at the Colegio Mayor de San Bartolomé before his 20th birthday. His adoptive grandfather, an Englishman called Paterson Saunders, had taught him Latin, Greek, English, French and Italian. Holguín later became an orator, debater, and writer. He was also a renowned journalist and professor of literature and history.

== Military career ==
Holguín enlisted in the army and participated in several military actions like the uprising against President José María Melo, the war against Tomás Cipriano de Mosquera, and the conservative revolt against Aquileo Parra in 1875.

== Political career ==
After Holguín graduated, he entered the civil service and held a few bureaucratic jobs with the central government. At 23, he was elected as state senator representing the district of Buenaventura and thereafter as President of the Cauca State Senate. Later he was elected several times to National Congress, representing the States of Antioquia, Cundinamarca, Tolima and Bolívar. Holguín was appointed also to several ministerial positions such as Minister of Foreign Relations, Interior and War.

In 1881, while in Rome, Holguín was commissioned by President Rafael Núñez to establish diplomatic relations with the Kingdom of Spain. By that time, Colombia was the only Latin American nation that did not have diplomatic relations with Spain. Thus, Holguín was appointed as Special Envoy and plenipotentiary Ambassador of Colombia to the Kingdom of Spain. As head of the diplomatic mission, he arrived in Madrid on 9 January 1881, where he was greeted by the King of Spain, Alfonso XII. For the first time, full diplomatic relations were established between the two nations.

Upon his return to Colombia, in November 1887, Holguín was appointed Minister of Foreign Relations by President Eliseo Payán. Later, President Rafael Núñez appointed him Minister of War.

== Presidency ==
Carlos Holguín became President of Colombia upon his election by Congress as Presidential Designate, the first time in 1888 and the second time in 1890. Thus, he ruled as president between 1888 and 1892, to complete the six years presidential term of President Rafael Núñez.

During his presidency, Holguín devoted time, energy and resources to the betterment of the nation's infrastructure, such as the improvement, restoration and development of main highways, railways, shipyards, sea ports, the waterways of the Atrato, Cauca, Magdalena and Nechí rivers, and the electric and telephone grids. He also created and established the "Policia Nacional" (national police).

During the conflict between the Italian entrepreneur Ernesto Cerruti and Colombian President Rafael Nuñez Italy mobilized a small naval squadron in 1888 fears were rampant that an Italian armed intervention was imminent on Colombian coasts. Finally, faced with the threat of military intervention and international pressure, the Colombian government opted to submit to international arbitration. In 1891, Pope Leo XIII, who was respected in both countries due to widespread Catholicism, intervened as mediator in the conflict. Under Papal arbitration, an agreement was reached in which Colombia was to pay compensation to Cerruti, although in an amount lower than that originally demanded by Italy.

Holguín was very much disliked and heavily criticized by the opposition party, the liberals, and Congress made it very difficult for him to govern. In his last address to Congress, before he handed over the presidency to Miguel Antonio Caro, he said, "In the four years that I have governed, not a single shot has been fired, not a single drop of blood has been spilled and not a single tear has been shed. I leave the country in peace and I did not incur in further debt."
