= Jorge Holguín =

President of Colombia from 1921 to 1922

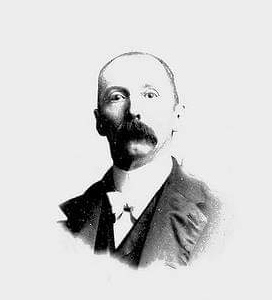

12th President of Colombia
- In office 11 November 1921 – 7 August 1922
- Preceded by: Marco Fidel Suárez
- Succeeded by: Pedro Nel Ospina

Presidential Designate
- In office 27 July 1909 – 4 August 1909
- President: Marco Fidel Suárez
- Preceded by: Euclides de Angulo
- Succeeded by: Marco Fidel Suárez

Minister of Foreign Affairs
- In office 7 August 1918 – 16 September 1918
- President: Marco Fidel Suárez
- Preceded by: Pedro Antonio Molina
- Succeeded by: Pedro Antonio Molina
- In office 1897–1898
- President: Miguel Antonio Caro
- Preceded by: José Maria Uricoechea
- Succeeded by: Antonio Gómez Restrepo

Minister of Finance
- In office 11 March 1909 – 22 March 1909
- President: Rafael Reyes
- Preceded by: Camilo Torres Eliceche
- Succeeded by: Nemesio Camacho
- In office 7 August 1904 – 15 December 1904
- President: Rafael Reyes
- Preceded by: Carlos Arturo Torres
- Succeeded by: Pedro Antonio Molina

Minister of War
- In office 22 March 1909 – 7 June 1909
- President: Rafael Reyes
- Preceded by: Eduardo Briceño
- Succeeded by: Diego Euclides de Angulo

Personal details
- Born: Jorge Marcelo Holguín Mallarino; 30 October 1848 Cali, Cauca Valley, Republic of New Granada
- Died: 2 March 1928 (aged 79) Bogotá, Cundinamarca, Colombia
- Party: Conservative
- Spouse: Cecilia Arboleda Mosquera (m. 1977; died 1924)
- Relations: Manuel María Mallarino (uncle); Carlos Holguín Mallarino (brother); Julio Arboleda Pombo (father-in-law)
- Children: 11
- Occupation: Businessman, soldier, journalist, writer, and politician

Military service
- Allegiance: Colombia (Conservative Party)
- Branch/service: Army
- Rank: General
- Battles/wars: Colombian Civil War of 1876; Colombian Civil War of 1895

Jorge Marcelo Holguín Mallarino (30 October 1848 – 2 March 1928) was a Colombian politician and military officer, two time Acting President of Colombia: June–August 1909 as interim president, and from November 1921 to August 1922. He also served a term as Minister of Foreign Affairs in which he signed the Holguín-Avebury treaty.

== Early life ==
He was born 30 October 1848 in Cali, Valle del Cauca Department, Republic of New Granada. His brother was Carlos Holguín Mallarino. He became a businessman, soldier, journalist, writer, and politician. He served in both the Colombian Civil War of 1876 and the Colombian Civil War of 1895.

== Career ==
He was Minister of Foreign Affairs from 1897 until 1898, and again from 7 August 1918 – 16 September 1918. He was Minister of Finance from 7 August 1904 – 15 December 1904, and 11 March 1909 – 22 March 1909. He was Minister of War from 22 March 1909 – 7 June 1909 and President of Colombia from 11 November 1921 – 7 August 1922.

He died in 1928 in Bogotá, Cundinamarca, Colombia.

== Personal life ==
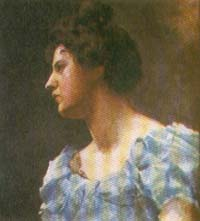
Cecilia Arboleda Mosquera, wife of Jorge Holguín, First Lady of Colombia, and mother of his 12 children. Oil painting by Epifanio Garay.

He was Roman Catholic. His wife Cecilia Arboleda Mosquera was the mother of his 12 children. He is related to María Ángela Holguín.

Political offices
Preceded by Marco Fidel Suárez	President of Colombia; 1921–1922	Succeeded by Pedro Nel Ospina Vázquez
