= Presidential Designate (Colombia) =

Colombian elected official

Presidential Designate of Colombia
- Seal of the Government of Colombia (1922-2002)

- Flag of Colombia

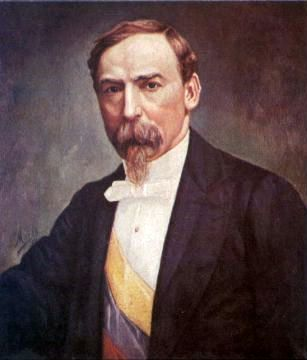
- Longest serving Carlos Holguín Mallarino; June 4, 1887 – August 7, 1888
- Style: His Excellency
- Type: Presidential Designate
- Status: Abolished
- Member of: Cabinet
- Reports to: Senate of Colombia
- Seat: Bogotá, D.C.
- Appointer: President of Colombia with Senate advice and consent
- Term length: Four years, once
- Precursor: Vice President of Colombia
- Formation: May 14, 1863
- First holder: Santos Gutiérrez
- Final holder: Juan Manuel Santos
- Abolished: August 7, 1991
- Succession: 1st in the line of succession

The Presidential Designate of Colombia is a member of the Cabinet without official duties since the Rafael Núñez's administration. The Presidential Designate was elected by the Senate to replace the president in the event of his death, resignation, or removal from office, and was first in the line of succession, ahead of the Minister of Government.

In 1991, with the adoption of the Constitution of 1991, the presidential designate was replaced by the vice president.

== History ==
=== Surviving president ===
The first trace of a presidential appointee emerged in New Granada when President Pedro Alcántara Herrán appointed Juan de Dios Aranzazu. Initially, the role of the Presidential Designate was to assume as president as a survivor in the event of the president or vice president's absolute absence.

=== Successor to the President ===
During the United States of Colombia, the position of Presidential Designee became the absolute successor to the president. During this period, the presidential designee was elected each year, along with the second and third designees. These three designees are responsible for replacing the president and cabinet members in the absence of any of them, in order to provide political stability to the executive branch.

With the birth of Colombia and the constitution in 1886, the office of Presidential Designated reappeared as the immediate successor to the president in 1905, when President Rafael Reyes, through a Constituent Assembly, abolished the office of vice president. Between 1910 and 1945, there was a substitute for the presidential appointee known as the second presidential appointee, which was later abolished. Finally, in 1991, the Constitution of 1991 abolished the office of Presidential Designate, bringing the office of Vice President back into the Colombian political scene.

== See also ==
- List of Presidential Designates of Colombia
