= Santos Gutiérrez =

Colombian statesman and soldier

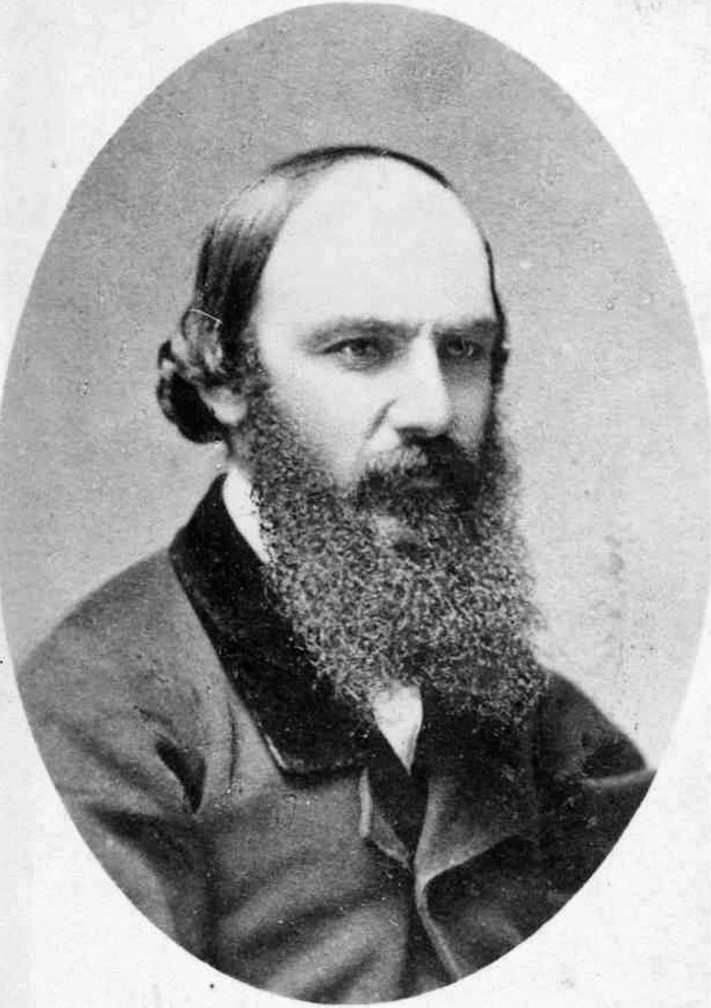

7th President of the United States of Colombia
- In office April 1, 1868 – April 1, 1870
- Preceded by: Santos Acosta
- Succeeded by: Eustorgio Salgar

Member of the Executive Ministry of the United States of Colombia
- In office February 9, 1863 – May 14, 1863 Serving with Eustorgio Salgar, José Hilario López, Froilan Largacha, and Tomás Cipriano de Mosquera
- Preceded by: Provisionary Office*
- Succeeded by: Provisionary Office*

19th President of the Sovereign State of Cundinamarca
- In office January 1, 1864 – January 18, 1865
- Preceded by: Alejo Morales
- Succeeded by: Rafael Mendoza

4th President of the Sovereign State of Boyacá
- In office 1861–1862
- Preceded by: David Torres
- Succeeded by: Pedro Cortés Holguin

Personal details
- Born: José Santos Gutiérrez Prieto; October 24, 1820 El Cocuy, Boyacá, Colombia
- Died: February 6, 1872 (aged 51) Bogotá, Cundinamarca, United States of Colombia
- Party: Liberal
- Spouse(s): Ana Deodata Bernal (1849-?); Hermelina Concha (1869-1872)
- Education: National University of Colombia
- Nickname(s): Tuso Gutiérrez, Colombian Garibaldi

Military service
- Allegiance: Colombia (Liberal Party)
- Branch/service: National Army of Colombia
- Rank: General
- Commands: Army Chief of Staff
- Battles/wars: War of the Supremes; Colombian Civil War (1860–1862)
- This was a provisional office position. See the preceding executive office’s officeholder Francisco Javier Zaldúa, and the replacing executive office’s officeholder Tomás Cipriano de Mosquera.

José Santos Gutiérrez Prieto (October 24, 1820 - February 6, 1872), was a Colombian statesman and soldier, who became president of the Sovereign State of Boyacá, and later elected as president of the United States of Colombia for the term of 1868-1870.

== Biographic data ==
Gutiérrez was born in the town of El Cocuy, Boyacá, on October 24, 1820. He died in Bogotá, Cundinamarca, on February 6, 1872.

== Early life ==
Gutiérrez’ family moved to Bogotá in order to provide him with adequate and high education. Gutiérrez completed his high school education in the Colegio Mayor de San Bartolomé, where he later studied jurisprudence and obtained his lawyer degree.

== Military career ==
In 1851, Gutiérrez entered the military academy and demonstrated an amazing talent and ability. His first action in combat was during the war against the administration of General José María Melo in 1854, in which he saved the life of General Tomás Cipriano de Mosquera. After his heroic performance in the battlefield he was ascended to the rank of General.

Later, in 1859, Gutiérrez leads the troops of General Mosquera in the province of Santander (today Department of Santander), during the civil war against the administration of President Mariano Ospina Rodríguez. In the battle of “La Concepción”, on August 29, 1860, he is wounded in action while, once again, saving the life of General Mosquera.

== Political career ==
After the civil war of 1859-1860, Gutiérrez is appointed, first, Governor of the province of Boyacá (1861-1862) and later, Governor of the province of Cundinamarca (1864-1865).

The revolutionary army of General Tomás Cipriano de Mosquera defeated the Constitutional Army of Colombia and after the presidential term of Mariano Ospina Rodríguez, on April 1, 1861, proclaimed himself as president. General Mosquera permits the Constitutional Congress or "Constitución de Rionegro" to assemble, and General Gutiérrez participated in it as delegate on his own recognizance.
