= Marco Fidel Suárez =

President of Colombia from 1918 to 1921

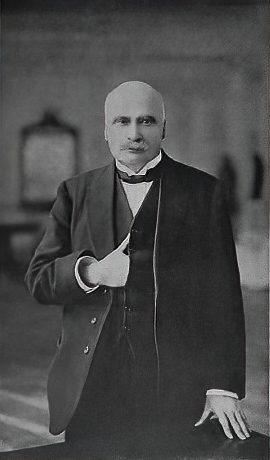

11th President of Colombia
- In office August 7, 1918 – November 11, 1921
- Preceded by: José Vicente Concha
- Succeeded by: Jorge Holguín

Minister of Foreign Affairs
- In office August 7, 1926 – January 12, 1927
- President: Miguel Abadía Méndez
- Preceded by: Eduardo Restrepo Sáenz
- Succeeded by: Carlos Uribe
- In office August 7, 1914 – October 30, 1917
- President: José Vicente Concha
- Preceded by: Francisco José Urrutia
- Succeeded by: Emilio Ferrero
- In office March 10, 1891 – 1895
- President: Carlos Holguín (1891-1892); Miguel Antonio Caro (1892-1895)
- Preceded by: Antonio Roldán
- Succeeded by: José Maria Uricoechea

Minister of Public Instruction
- In office November 23, 1911 – February 12, 1912
- President: Carlos Eugenio Restrepo
- Preceded by: José María González Valencia
- Succeeded by: Carlos Cuervo Márquez
- In office August 7, 1898 – July 31, 1900
- President: Manuel Antonio Sanclemente
- Succeeded by: Miguel Abadía Méndez

Personal details
- Born: April 23, 1855 Hatoviejo, Antioquia, New Granada
- Died: April 3, 1927 (aged 71) Bogotá, Cundinamarca, Colombia
- Party: Conservative
- Spouse: Isabel Orrantia y Borda (m. 1895; died 1901)
- Children: María Antonia and Gabriel

Marco Fidel Suárez (April 23, 1855 – April 3, 1927) was a Colombian political figure. He served as president of Colombia from 1918 to 1921. He was born on April 23, 1855, in the town of Hatoviejo, Antioquia. His parents were Rosalía Suárez and José María Barrientos.

== Early life ==
Suárez came from a very poor background, born in a two-room hut in Hatoviejo, today the town of Bello, Antioquia, adjacent to Medellín in the highland department of Antioquia. An illegitimate child at a time when official records always distinguished between "natural children" and "legitimate children" (and the former status was a disadvantage for life), his mother was a laundress; his wealthy father refused to recognize him or provide for him in any way. Since his mother was unable to pay for him to attend the local elementary public school, he stood at a window of the school in an effort to observe the lessons. After a time he began to yell out answers to the teacher's questions when the other pupils couldn't answer. Eventually, the teacher, suitably impressed, invited him to attend class without having to pay. Later on he joined a Catholic seminary but did not attain the priesthood as the seminary was closed.

Suárez studied his primary education in the public school of Hatoviejo. Later he studied in the seminary of the town of La Ceja, Antioquia. He then transferred to the Seminario Mayor de Medellín, where he studied philosophy, literature and theology for the priesthood. He stopped short of being ordained.

In the 1870s, he participated in the civil conflict that took place in Antioquia, fighting on the side of Colonel Braulio Jaramillo, attaining a battlefield promotion to Lieutenant.

== Philosopher, poet and writer ==
Suárez became a very well known and distinguished philologist, philosopher, poet, writer and teacher. Marco Fidel, along with Rufino José Cuervo and Miguel Antonio Caro, is considered one of the most important and influential scholars of the Spanish grammar in Colombia. His best literary work was "los Sueños de Luciano Pulgar" (1926).

== Presidency ==
As president, Suárez implemented the "North Star" policy which linked the foreign policy of Colombia with that of the United States of America.

He was harassed by conservative opponents, mainly Laureano Gómez, who politicized his illegitimate birth, and attempted to depict him as corrupt politician. In his defense, the Secretary of State Antonio Gómez Restrepo proclaimed: "You will always be the legitimate President of Colombia".

At his initiative, the income tax legislation was enacted into law in 1918. Later, in 1919, the nation was interconnected by an advance system of wireless telegraphy.

Suárez was very fond of aviation. In 1919 he sanctioned Law 126 by which commercial aviation was established and authorized, allowing for international travel and the operation of the postal service. A year later he brought to the country a French mission to establish and train the Colombian Air Force.

In November 1918, a law was passed that promoted the building of housing for working-class people. In addition, an Act was introduced in August 1921 that specified the hygienic conditions to be observed (as noted by one study) “in hydrocarbon deposits, warehouses, and works.”

== Personal life ==
Suárez married Isabel Orrantia y Borda in August 1895. They had two children. His wife died six years later and his son died in New York in 1918. His mother Rosalía Suárez died in March 1918. Thus, the day of his inauguration as the 35th President of Colombia, on August 7, 1918, he had a profound pain and sorrow for the death of his beloved mother, wife and son. His son died while studying in Pittsburgh, and he was forbidden from repatriating the body using State funds.

== El Hijo de la Choza ==
The movie director and producer Enock Roldan, in 1959, produced a movie film about the life of Marco Fidel Suárez. The movie, called El Hijo de la Choza ("The Son of the Hut"), became a best seller of its time, surpassing in domestic sales that of The Ten Commandments. The film covered the story from the romantic affair of his parents Rosalía Suárez and José María Barrientos, his birth out of wedlock, his struggles and hardships, his rejection by society and all the way until his inauguration as President of Colombia in 1918.

== Influence ==
In 1881, Suárez won the award of best Colombian writer by the "Academia Colombiana de la Lengua". His literary work had been to honor the centennial birth of Don Andrés Bello. In recognition to his work, the town of Hatoviejo changed its name to Bello, Antioquia.

The hut where he was born and lived as a child, is preserved as a museum in the town of Bello, Antioquia.

== Popular culture ==
It is a point of pride for Colombians that, supposedly, "more poets than soldiers have occupied the Presidency"; as a man of letters, Suárez falls into the former category.

Various popular stories are told about Suárez. During a debate in Congress, an opponent referred to his illegitimate birth, and he responded: "Sir: I am a child of love, it is true. You are a child of obligation."

Suárez is mentioned in Gabriel García Márquez's novel, Love in the Time of Cholera.

Political offices
| Preceded by José Vicente Concha | President of Colombia; 1918-1921 | Succeeded by Jorge Holguín |
