= Ministry of Foreign Affairs (Colombia) =

Government ministry of Colombia

- Ministerio de Relaciones Exteriores

Ministry overview
- Formed: 27 December 2002
- Preceding agencies: Ministry of Foreign Trade; Ministry of Economic Development
- Jurisdiction: Government of Colombia
- Headquarters: Centro de Comercio Internacional Calle 28 No. 13 A–15 Bogotá, D.C., Colombia; 04°36′56.40″N 74°04′16.48″W
- Annual budget: COP$599,063,957,867 (2012); COP$672,507,972,786 (2013); COP$571,581,879,281 (2014)
- Ministry executive: Minister of Foreign Affairs (acting); Deputy Minister of Foreign Affairs; Deputy Minister of Multilateral Affairs
- Website: www.cancilleria.gov.co

The Ministry of Foreign Affairs (Spanish: Ministerio de Relaciones Exteriores, MRE), also known as the Chancellery (Spanish: Cancillería), is the Cabinet position of the Government of Colombia responsible for the international relations of Colombia through its diplomatic missions abroad by formulating foreign policy relevant to the matters of the State. It is equivalent to the foreign affairs ministries of other countries.
