= Ezequiel Hurtado =

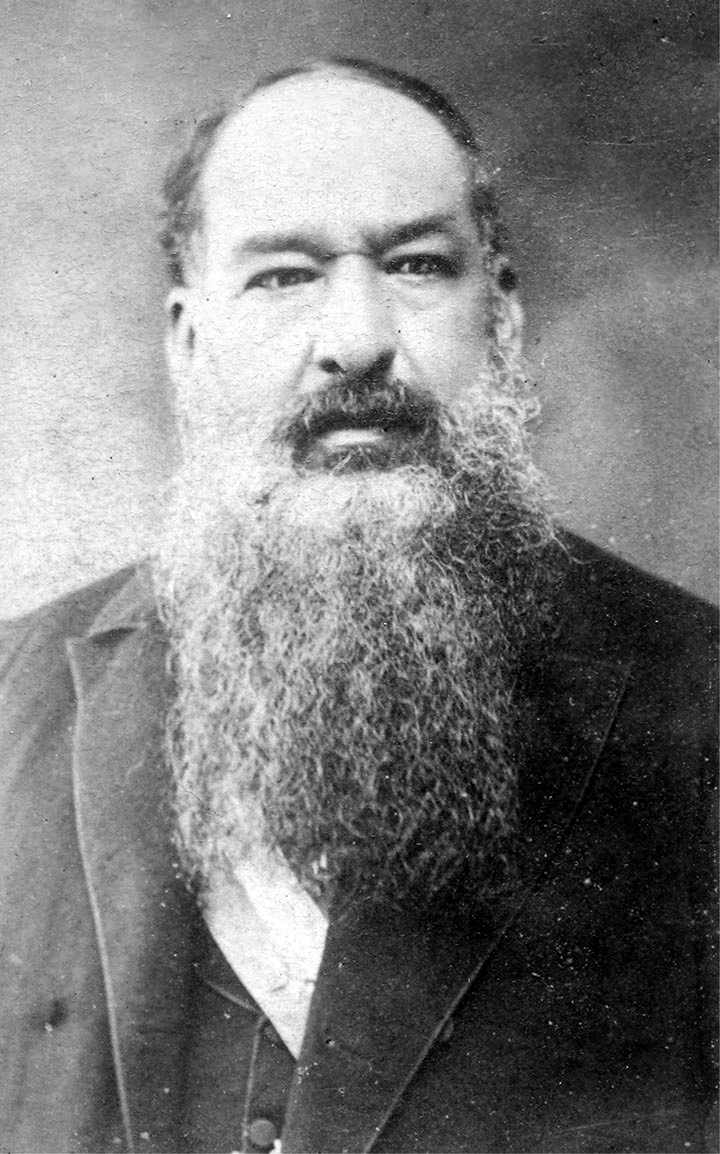

17th President of the United States of Colombia
- In office April 1, 1884 – August 11, 1884
- Preceded by: José Eusebio Otálora
- Succeeded by: Rafael Nuñez

10th President of the Sovereign State of Cauca
- In office August 1, 1879 – August 1, 1883
- Preceded by: Eliseo Payán
- Succeeded by: Eliseo Payán

Secretary of War and Navy
- In office 1878–1879
- President: Julián Trujillo Largacha
- Preceded by: Fernando Ponce
- Succeeded by: Eliseo Payan

Personal details
- Born: Ezequiel Hurtado Hurtado; December 14, 1825 Silvia, Cauca, Colombia
- Died: September 24, 1890 (aged 64) Popayán, Cauca, Colombia
- Resting place: Panteón de los Próceres de Popayán
- Party: Liberal
- Education: University of Cauca
- Occupation: Soldier (General) and politician
- Profession: Lawyer

Military service
- Allegiance: Colombia (Liberal Party)
- Rank: General
- Battles/wars: Colombian Civil War (1860–1862); Colombian Civil War of 1876; Colombian Civil War of 1884-85

Ezequiel Hurtado (1825-1890) was a politician, military general and statesman who became 17th President of Colombia.

== Biography ==
He was born in Silvia, in the department of Cauca, December 14, 1825, and died in Popayán, September 4, 1890. His parents were Nicolas Hurtado and Maria Trinidad Hurtado. He went to school at Colegio San Jose and then studied law at the University of Cauca, where he graduated on January 27, 1852. He subsequently became a University lecturer in law.

His initial military involvement was in 1851, in defence of legal institutions. Two years later his military and political career started in earnest with the Colombian Liberal Party in the fight against the dictator José María Melo.

From 1860 he took part in revolutionary movements against the Conservative Government of Mariano Ospina Rodriguez. He joined the army of General Tomas Cipriano de Mosquera which was successful in 1861, and he was promoted to the rank of General.

Subsequently he was part of the Cauca State Assembly and served as a government minister on various occasions. He also took part in the Convention of Rionegro which produced the 1863 Constitution.

In 1868 he was elected as a Parliamentary representative and then a Senator. In 1878 President Julián Trujillo Largacha appointed him Minister of War and Navy, and a year later he was elected Governor of the Sovereign State of Cauca (1879–1883).
Hurtado's elevation was due to the "April Revolution" (1879), led by Generals Eliseo Payán and Juan de Dios Ulloa, who represented a coalition of independents and "Mosqueristas" who opposed the abuses committed by radicals.

Leaving office in 1883, he was elected by Congress to be the Designated President of the Republic and was appointed Presiding Judge by the Supreme Court of Justice. He exercised presidential power between April and August 1884, due to the delay of Rafael Nuñez assuming power. In his responsibilities he appointed as cabinet ministers of Housing, Finance, Public Works, External Relations, Public Education and War the following: Manuel M. Castro, Felipe Angulo, Mariano Tanco y José María Caro, José J. Vargas, Eustorgio Salgar, Napoleón Borrero and José María Campo Serrano.

When he left the Presidency he campaigned against the Nuñez's Regeneration project, and in the following Civil war of 1885, he was taken prisoner and suffered harsh treatment. He was subsequently exiled to Costa Rica (Central America), but in 1889, shortly before his death, was allowed to return to Colombia.

His remains are now in the Panteon de los Proceres Cemetery in Popayán (Cauca). This burial ground was inaugurated by Guillermo León Valencia in 1940.
