= José Eusebio Otalora =

Colombian statesman and General

José Eusebio Otálora
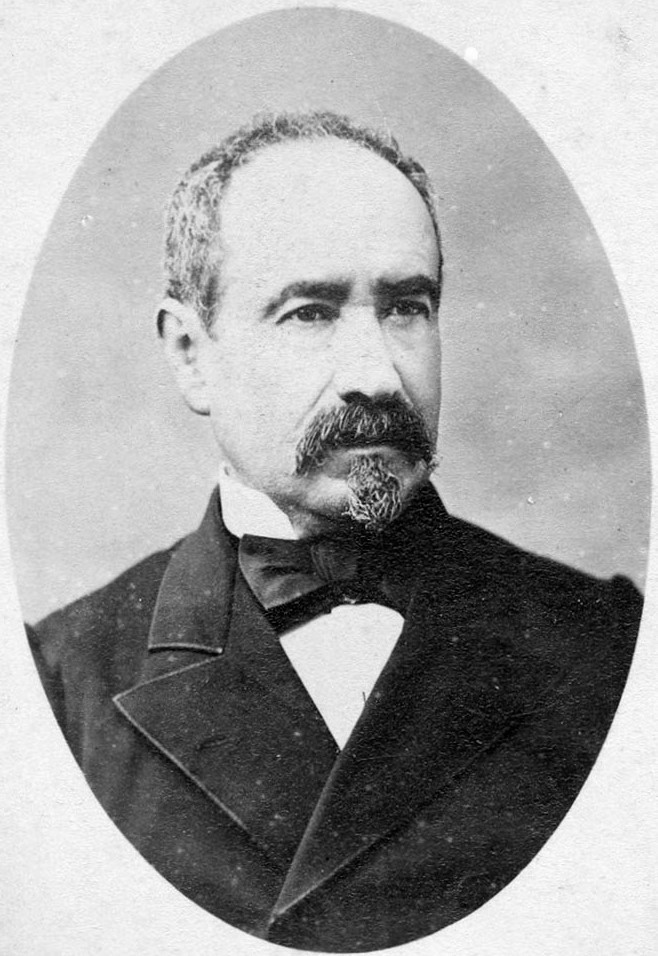

16th President of the United States of Colombia
- In office December 22, 1882 – April 1, 1884
- Preceded by: Clímaco Calderón
- Succeeded by: Ezequiel Hurtado

14th President of the Sovereign State of Boyacá
- In office 1877–1882
- Preceded by: José del C. Rodríguez
- Succeeded by: Aristides Calderón

Personal details
- Born: José Eusebio Otálora Martínez; December 16, 1826 Fomeque, Cundinamarca, Colombia
- Died: April 1, 1884 (aged 57) Tocaima, Cundinamarca, United States of Colombia
- Party: Liberal
- Spouse: Mercedes González Ramirez
- Education: Our Lady of the Rosary University
- Occupation: Lawyer, professor, diplomat

Military service
- Allegiance: Colombia (Liberal Party)
- Rank: General
- Battles/wars: Colombian Civil War 1860-1862; Colombian Civil War of 1876

José Eusebio Otálora Martínez (1826 – April 1, 1884) was a Colombian statesman and General who became President of the United States of Colombia in 1882 in his capacity as the Second Presidential Designate following the death of President Francisco Javier Zaldúa, and the non-acceptance of the office by the First Designate Rafael Núñez.

== Biographic data ==
Otálora was born in Fomeque, Cundinamarca, on December 16, 1826, and died from a heart attack in Tocaima, Cundinamarca, on April 1, 1884. He was the second Colombian President to die office.
