= Eliseo Payán =

Colombian lawyer, politician and military officer

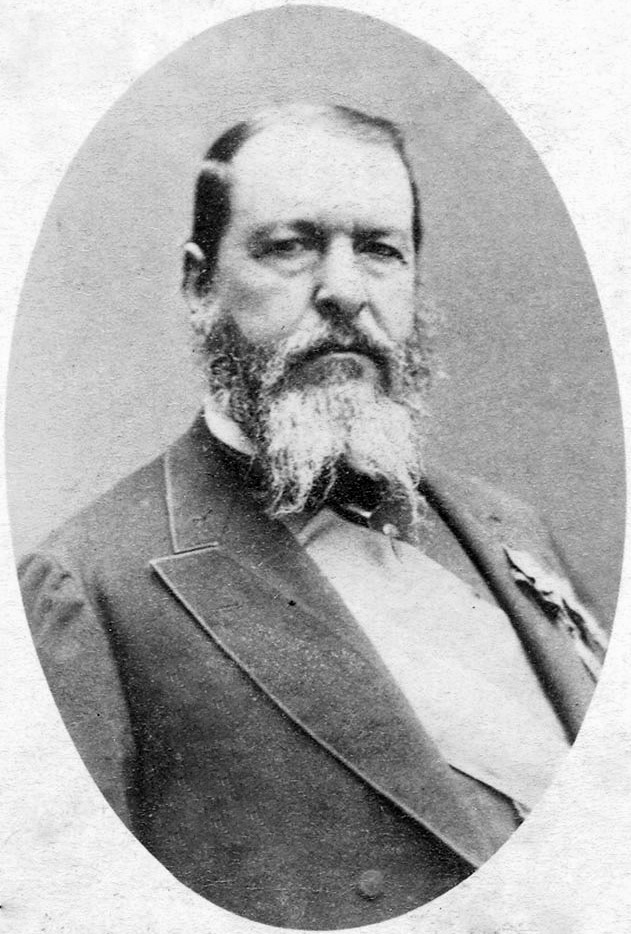
- Portrait c. 1890.

1st Vice President of Colombia
- In office December 13, 1887 – February 8, 1888 (Note: Payán serves as Acting President from January 7 to June 4, 1887 and again from December 12, 1889 to February 8, 1888)
- President: Rafael Núñez
- Preceded by: Office established
- Succeeded by: Miguel Antonio Caro

President of the Sovereign State of Cauca
- In office August 1, 1883 – August 5, 1886
- Preceded by: Ezequiel Hurtado
- Succeeded by: Position abolished
- In office April 22, 1879 – August 1, 1879
- Preceded by: Modesto Garcés Garcés
- Succeeded by: Ezequiel Hurtado
- In office August 15, 1863 – August 15, 1867
- Preceded by: Tomás Cipriano de Mosquera
- Succeeded by: Julián Trujillo Largacha

Personal details
- Born: José Eliseo Payán Hurtado; August 1, 1825 Cali, Cauca Valley, Colombia
- Died: June 30, 1895 (aged 69) Buga, Cauca Valley, Colombia
- Party: Liberal
- Spouse: Carmen Ospina Lenis
- Occupation: Lawyer, journalist, soldier, politician

Military service
- Allegiance: Colombia (Conservative Party)
- Branch/service: National Army of Colombia
- Rank: General
- Battles/wars: War of the Supremes; Colombian Civil War (1860–1862); Colombian Civil War of 1876; Colombian Civil War (1884–1885)

José Eliseo Payán Hurtado (August 1, 1825 – June 30, 1895) was a Colombian lawyer, politician, and military officer. Payán Vice President of Colombia assumed the Presidency of Colombia because of the absence of President Rafael Núñez in 1887.

== Early life ==
Payán was born in Santiago de Cali on August 1, 1825. Payán studied in the Colegio Santa Librada, in Cali, and later graduated as a lawyer, profession he practiced mostly in the city of Buga along with commerce and other administrative jobs. He also founded the Democratic Society of Buga and produced a newspaper, El Sentimiento Democrático, with the help of Manuel Antonio Scarpetta and Ramón Mercado.

== Military career ==
Payán joined the army, and most of the time was under the orders of liberal commanders. In 1840, Payán participated in the War of the Supremes under the command of General José María Obando, fighting against the army of President José Ignacio de Márquez. Later, in 1854, he joined the army of José Hilario López in the battles against José María Melo.

Payán became a general in the army and participated in the Colombian Civil War of 1860–1862 supporting General Tomás Cipriano de Mosquera against the legitimate and constitutional government of conservative President Mariano Ospina Rodríguez.

General Payán intervened in the Colombian Civil War of 1876 to defend the government of Aquileo Parra. At the battle of Los Chancos, he was taken prisoner by the conservative forces. General Julián Trujillo, commander of the Caucan Army, appointed him brigadier of a revolutionary division. He was able to confront and defeat the conservative forces in Antioquia at the Battle of Batero.

In 1879, he organized an army to topple the president of the State of Cauca. Governor Garcés was deposed, and Payan gave control to a civilian, Ezequiel Hurtado, who was then elected as President of the State of Cauca.

In 1885, Payán joins the forces of conservative President Rafael Núñez in the Civil War against the liberal rebels. After the war, Núñez appoints him as Minister of War.

== Political career ==
After the war, Payán began his political career in the Provincial Chamber of Cauca, where he became known for his oratory skills. Between 1854 and 1855, Payán served in the Congress of Colombia as the representative for Cauca.

== President of Colombia ==
After being re-elected President of Cauca, Payán, who had also being elected Vice President of Colombia, had to resign his post in Cauca to replace the ailing sitting president Núñez. He assumed office on January 6, 1887, and served as president until June 4. He once again was called to replace President Núñez on December 13, 1882, to February 8, 1888, while the President recovered. During his control of the presidency, Payán decreed the absolute freedom of press in the nation, a policy that created great controversy, which forced him to resign as vice president after the constant struggles with his opponents in Congress and the President himself.

== Death ==
He died in Buga on June 30, 1895.

== Notes ==
Political offices
New title	Vice President of Colombia; 1887-1888	Succeeded by Miguel Antonio Caro
