= Salvador Camacho =

Colombian lawyer, businessman and politician

Salvador Camacho Roldán
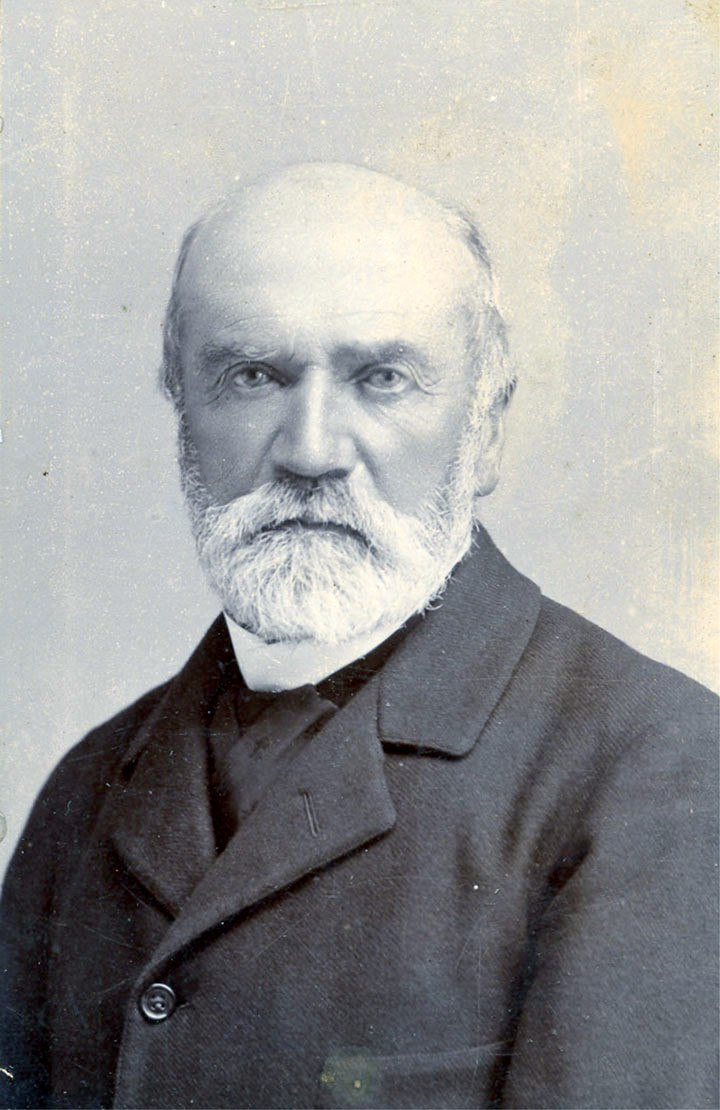

Secretary of Foreign Affairs
- In office November 1878 – December 1878
- President: Julián Trujillo Largacha
- Preceded by: Francisco Javier Zaldúa
- Succeeded by: Pablo Arosemena Alba

9th Secretary of Treasury and Public Credit
- In office April 1, 1878 – November 1878
- Preceded by: Jose Maria Quijano Wallis
- Succeeded by: Emigdio Paláu

7th Secretary of Finance and Development
- In office 1870–1872
- President: Eustorgio Salgar Moreno
- Preceded by: Januario Salgar
- Succeeded by: Aquileo Parra Gómez

Governor of Panama
- In office 1852–1853
- President: José Hilario López
- Preceded by: Bernardo Arze De Mata
- Succeeded by: Bernardo Arze De Mata

Personal details
- Born: January 1, 1827 Nunchía, Casanare, Colombia
- Died: June 19, 1900 (aged 73) Zipacón, Cundinamarca, Colombia
- Party: Liberal
- Spouse: Carmen Tamayo Restrepo (1859-1900)
- Education: Our Lady of the Rosary University
- Profession: Lawyer

Salvador Camacho Roldán (January 1, 1827 – June 19, 1900) was a Colombian lawyer, businessman and politician who, as Presidential Designate, served as President of Colombia ad interim in 1868 and again in 1871. He also served as Congressman in both houses, Governor of Panama, and Secretary Foreign Affairs, of Finance and Development, and of Treasury and Public Credit.

== Works ==
The following is a chronological list of works authored by Camacho Roldán:

- Notas de Viaje: Colombia y los Estados Unidos [Notes on Travel: Colombia and the United States]. Bogotá: Talleres Gráficos del Banco de la República. 1890. OCLC 318334749.
- Escritos Varios, Volumen I [Various Writings, Volume 1]. Bogotá: Librería Colombiana. 1892. OCLC 318283238.
- Escritos Varios, Volumen II [Various Writings, Volume 2]. Bogotá: Librería Colombiana. 1893. OCLC 19765083.
- Escritos Varios, Volumen III [Various Writings, Volume 3]. Bogotá: Librería Colombiana. 1895. OCLC 318283239.
- Memorias [Memoir]. Bogotá: Cromos. 1923. OCLC 2193361.

== See also ==
- Víctor Mosquera Chaux
