= Clímaco Calderón =

15th president of Colombia

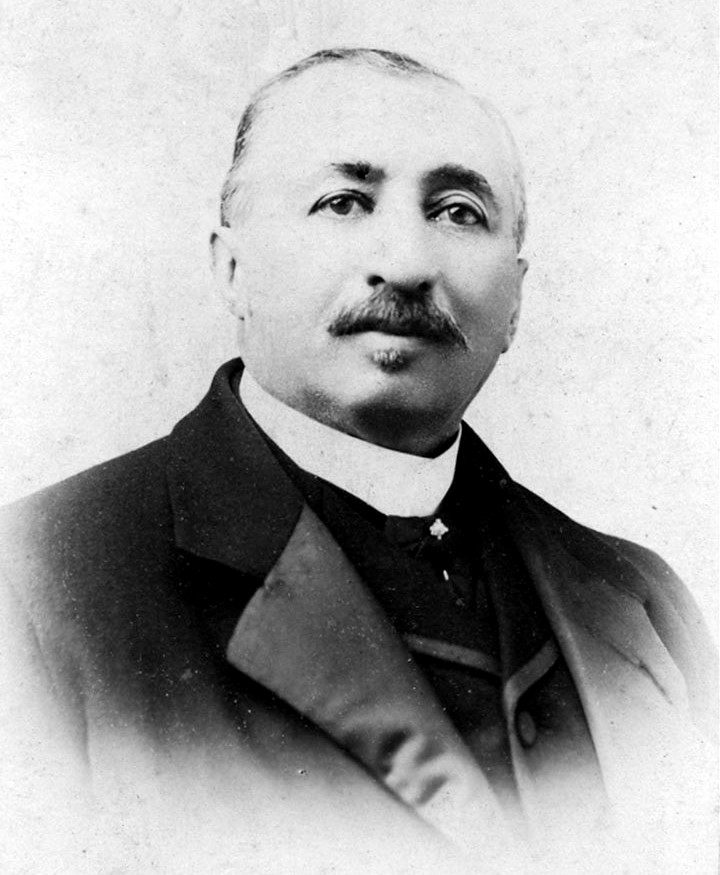

15th President of the United States of Colombia
- In office December 21, 1882 – December 22, 1882
- Preceded by: Francisco Javier Zaldúa
- Succeeded by: José Eusebio Otálora

Minister of Foreign Affairs
- In office October 27, 1904 – June 1, 1906
- President: Rafael Reyes
- Preceded by: Enrique Cortés
- Succeeded by: Alfredo Vásquez Cobo

Personal details
- Born: Clímaco Calderón Reyes; August 23, 1852 Santa Rosa de Viterbo, Boyacá, Republic of New Granada
- Died: July 19, 1913 (aged 60) Bogotá, Cundinamarca, Colombia
- Party: Liberal
- Spouse: Amelia Pérez Triana
- Education: Our Lady of the Rosary University
- Occupation: Lawyer, professor, writer, politician
- Profession: Lawyer

Clímaco Calderón Reyes (August 23, 1852 – July 19, 1913) was a Colombian lawyer and politician, who became 15th President of Colombia for one day, following the death of President Francisco Javier Zaldúa.

== Biographic data ==
Calderón was born in Santa Rosa de Viterbo, Boyacá Department, on August 23, 1852, in what was then the Republic of New Granada. He died in Bogotá, Cundinamarca on July 19, 1913, at the age of 60.

== Personal life ==
His parents were Carlos Calderón Reyes and Clotilde Reyes Fonseca, half sister of future President Rafael Reyes Prieto. He was married to Amelia Pérez Triana, daughter of President Santiago Pérez de Manosalba.

After finishing school in his native city, he attended Our Lady of the Rosary University in Bogotá, where he graduated with a Doctorate in Jurisprudence, where he also worked as professor of Civil and Penal law.

== Political career ==
Calderón started his political ascend in Boyacá where he was judge in the Circuit court of Tunja, deputy in the Legislative Assembly, and Director of Education during the administration of José Eusebio Otálora.

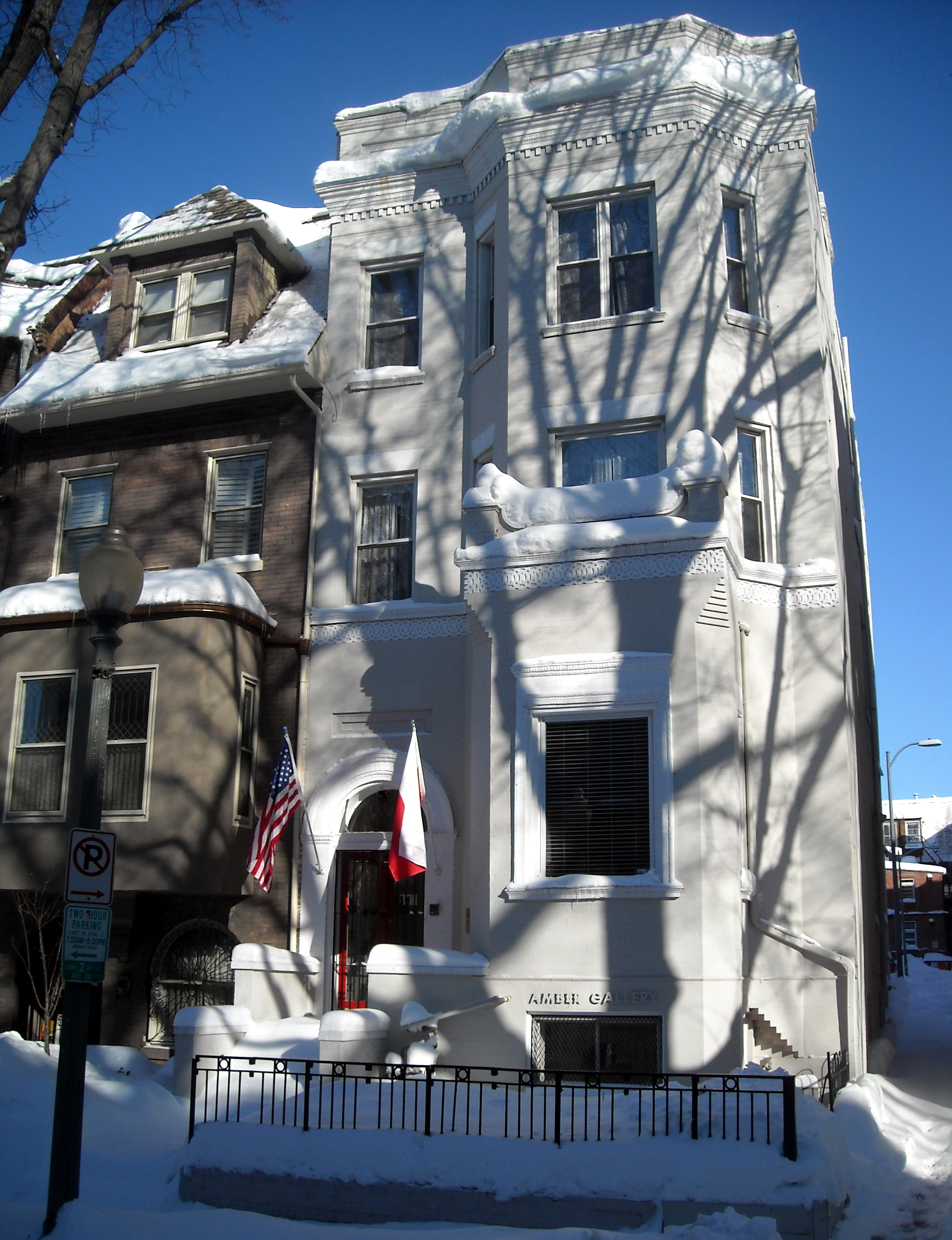
Calderón's home while serving as Representative to the United States

During the Administration of Francisco Javier Zaldúa he was named Attorney General of the Nation. On December 21, 1882, following the death of President Zaldúa, Calderón became President of Colombia in accordance to the presidential line of succession, which indicated that given the death of the sitting president, the presidency would fall to the first and second designates respectively, but at the time of Zaldúa's death the Designates, Rafael Núñez and José Eusebio Otálora were absent, and in this case, the Attorney General of Colombia would hold the executive power, thus making Calderón Reyes the 17th President of the United States of Colombia.

Calderón also worked as Minister of Foreign Affairs, and Colombian Consul general and Plenipotentiary to the United States.

== The Presidency ==
His presidency is the shortest in the history of Colombia. The only executive order he carried out was ordering his troops, that were under the command of General Sergio Camargo, to disobey orders given by the now deceased president Zaldúa, who had commanded General Camargo to ready his troops to take military action on Congress for their opposition against him.

The next day, on December 22, Calderón handed down the presidency to José Eusebio Otálora. Even though Calderón only served as president for one day, Calderón was granted the benefits of an Ex-President and it is included in the presidential line along with his predecessor and successor.

After his short presidency, Calderón became an important Colombian diplomat, serving for nearly twenty years in the United States first as Consul General of Colombia to New York and subsequently as Colombian Minister to Washington, and was named Minister of Foreign Affairs by President Rafael Reyes on October 27, 1904.

== Literary work ==
Calderón had a special interest on history and Finance and wrote some books on this subjects.

- El Curso Forzoso en los Estados Unidos New York. La América Editorial Company, 1892.
- Elementos de Hacienda Pública Bogotá. Imprenta de "La Luz", 1911.
- Colombia 1893.
- La moneda en la época colonial
- Memorias sobre amonestación en el Nuevo Reino de Granada
- Los bancos americanos

== See also ==
- David Rice Atchison
- Pedro Carmona
- Haribon Chebani
