= Jose Maria Quijano Wallis =

Colombian politician (1847–1922)

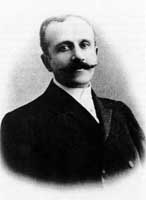

Colombian Secretary of Foreign Affairs
- In office 1882–1882
- President: Froilán Largacha Hurtado

8th Colombian Secretary of Treasury and Public Credit
- In office April 1876 – November 1877
- Succeeded by: Salvador Camacho Roldán

Senator of United States of Colombia
- In office 20 July 1872 – 19 January 1873
- President: Eustorgio Salgar Moreno
- Preceded by: Januario Salgar
- Succeeded by: Aquileo Parra Gómez

Member of the House of Representatives of United States of Colombia
- In office 20 July 1870 – 19 July 1871

Envoy Extraordinary and Minister Plenipotentiary of Colombia to the United Kingdom

Personal details
- Born: July 20, 1847 Popayán, Cauca, Colombia
- Died: March 24, 1922 (aged 74) Bogotá, Cundinamarca, Colombia
- Resting place: Templo de San Francisco; Popayán, Cauca, Colombia
- Party: Liberal
- Spouse: Felisa Manrique Barberi Holguín
- Children: Guillermo Quijano Manrique; Cecilia Quijano Manrique; Rosa Quijano Manrique
- Education: University of Cauca Complutense University of Madrid
- Profession: Lawyer
- Awards: Order of Saints Maurice and Lazarus

Jose Maria Quijano Wallis (July 20, 1847 – March 24, 1922) was a Colombian lawyer, diplomat, politician and historian.

== Life ==
His parents were Manuel de Jesús Quijano y Ordóñez (born in Latacunga, Ecuador) and Rafaela Wallis y Caldas, daughter of an English physician, George Wallis, and Baltazara Jorge Caldas, younger sister of the wise and patriotic Francisco José de Caldas. He also served as Congressman in both houses, Governor of Cauca, and Secretary Foreign Affairs, of Finance and Development, and of Treasury and Public Credit.

Finished his studies Regidor went from Popayan, 1865 to 1867 to the Legislature of Cauca, and later was Secretary to the Government of that State in 1867, Principal of the College of Popayan and teacher of various kinds in 1869. Deputy to the House of Representatives in 1870 and 71, and Senator in 1872. Back from a trip to Europe was Secretary to the Governor of Cauca and in 1875 the Director of Public Instruction in the State. Again deputy in 1876, he had under his charge the credit portfolio of the Treasury and Office.

Later in 1878, he was appointed Chargé d'Affaires and Consul General in the Kingdom of Italy, close to His Majesty the King Umberto, where he remained until 1881. During the time of his stay in Europe travel and study made important and deserved the high honor of receiving the Cross of Commander of the Order of Saints Maurice and Lazarus.

He was elected President of the Colombian Academy of Jurisprudence in 1913.

== Selected works ==
Works authored by Jose Maria Quijano Wallis include the following.

- Memorias autobiográficas, histórico políticas y de carácter social [Autobiographical Memoirs, historical and social policies]. París: París; Grottaferrata, Tip. Italo-Oriente. 1919. OCLC 13138782. With 40 chapters, containing details and facts unknown at the time of the country's history, important characters, performances and anecdotes such as Julio payaneses Arboleda, José María Obando, Santiago Pérez, Manuel Murillo, Florian Largacha, etc. Relationship of different country's internal wars in the years he was an actor or viewer. He gives many details about his family, ancestors and government actions in the political, diplomatic and management.
- Estudios, discursos y escritos varios [Studies, speeches and various writings]. At head of title:Por la patria y por la paz (in Spanish). Paris: R. Roger y F. Chernoviz. 1908. hdl:2027/hvd.32044082660226. OCLC 903480537 – via HathiTrust.
- Informes de las Comisiones de la Cámara de Representantes de Colombia sobre la solicitud del gran General Mosquera [Reports of Committees of the House of Representatives of Colombia on the request of the great General Mosquera]. Bogota: Imprenta de Echeverria Hermanos, Tip. Italo-oriente. 1870. OCLC 12129530.
- Tres discursos en los festejos del Centenario [Three speeches at the Centennial celebrations] (in Spanish). Bogotá: Imprenta de El Nuevo Tiempo. 1910. OCLC 891372472 – via Universidad Eafit.

== See also ==
- University of Cauca
- Popayán
- Complutense University of Madrid
- Salvador Camacho
- Ministry of Foreign Affairs (Colombia)
- United States of Colombia
- Liberal Party of Colombia
