= Alberto Montezuma Hurtado =

Colombian politician, historian and journalist

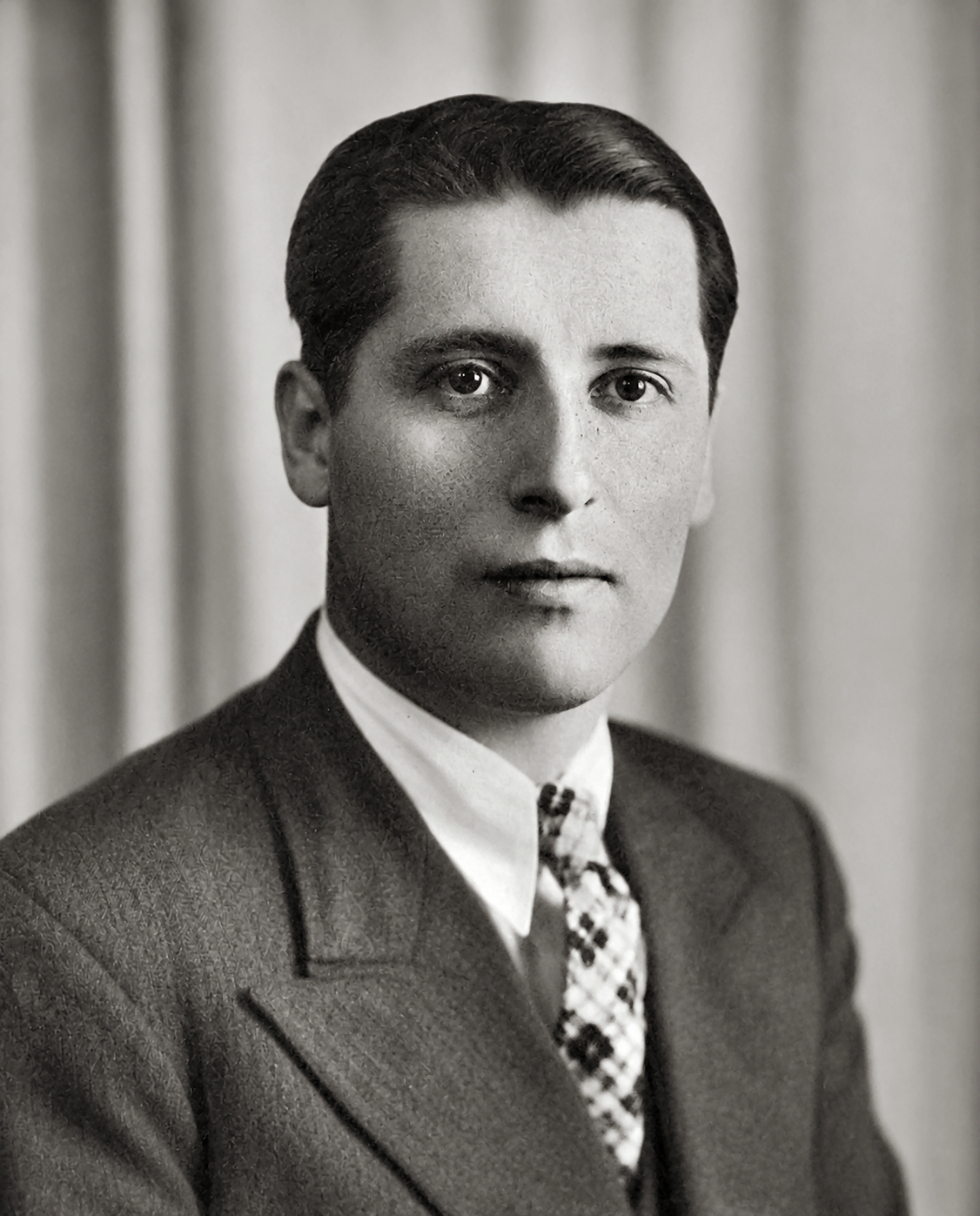
- Montezuma Hurtado as Governor of Nariño Department, 1939

Governor of Nariño Department
- In office 17 August 1938 – 28 June 1940
- Preceded by: Max Llorente Ortiz
- Succeeded by: Bolívar Santander Uscátegui

Personal details
- Born: Luis Alberto Montezuma Hurtado; July 21, 1906 Pasto, Colombia
- Died: February 11, 1987 (aged 80) Bogotá, Colombia
- Resting place: Jardines de Paz Cemetery, Bogotá
- Education: Columbia University; École Libre des Sciences Politiques
- Occupation: Politician, diplomat, historian, journalist, writer, academic, composer

Luis Alberto Montezuma Hurtado (21 July 1906 – 11 February 1987), commonly known as Alberto Montezuma Hurtado, Alberto Montezuma, or A. Montezuma, was a Colombian politician, diplomat, historian, journalist, writer, academic, and composer.

During his public career, Montezuma Hurtado served as Governor of Nariño Department, a member of the Chamber of Representatives of Colombia, Senator of Colombia, President of the Senate of Colombia, Ambassador of Colombia to Guatemala, and Treasurer General of Colombia. Alongside his political career, he founded several newspapers, published numerous historical and literary works and composed several musical compositions.

He was the son of the merchant Rubén Montezuma and Dolores Hurtado Salazar, daughter of Ezequiel Hurtado, President of the United States of Colombia.

== Early life and education ==
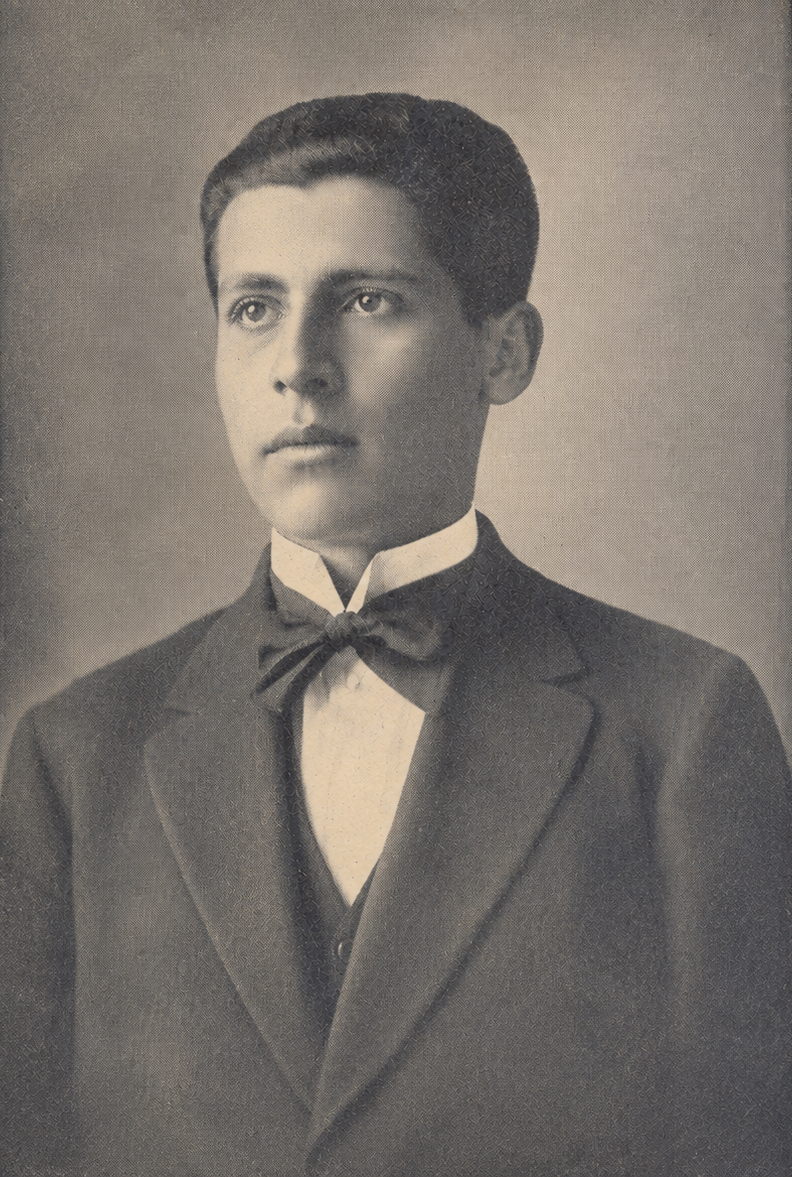
Montezuma Hurtado after winning first prize for poetry at the Juegos Florales in Pasto, 1925.

Montezuma Hurtado completed his secondary education at Colegio San Felipe Neri in Pasto. His poem El Huerto, signed "Alberto Montezuma H.", was first published in the third issue of the literary magazine Azul on 7 August 1925. The poem reflects on the loss of his mother and is among the earliest known examples of his literary work.

In 1925, he won first prize for poetry at the Juegos Florales, a literary competition held in Pasto, with Sueño, submitted under the pseudonym "Ébaro". A later issue of Azul described his early writings as romantic and melancholic.

He continued his studies at Columbia University in New York, where he is listed in the university's official catalogue for the 1926–1927 academic year.

He subsequently enrolled at the École libre des sciences politiques in Paris. Admission required foreign applicants to pass a highly selective French-language entrance examination. He studied in the Economic and Social section during the 1928–1929, 1929–1930 and 1930–1931 academic years, graduating on 2 July 1931.

Two oil paintings signed "A. Montezuma" and dated 1928 were presented by Montezuma Hurtado to his brother-in-law Marcel Clament during his stay in France. They are now preserved by his great-grandson. In Piedras preciosas (1964), Montezuma Hurtado wrote that he wished "to develop as much as possible" his natural inclination for painting.

According to Jorge Mora Caldas, Montezuma Hurtado enjoyed practising palmistry and often read the palms of his friends. Mora Caldas later recalled that Montezuma Hurtado predicted both the birth of one of his sons and the total number of children he would have, which he later stated had proved accurate.

== Personal life ==
While studying in France, Montezuma Hurtado met Madeleine Clament (28 April 1908 – 5 July 1934), a native of La Charité-sur-Loire. Her father, Louis Augustin Clament, was killed in action in 1914 during the First World War, and her mother, Louise Marguerite Janvier, died on 27 May 1916, leaving Madeleine orphaned at the age of eight.

The Paris census of 1926 lists Clament as a dancer, while the 1931 census records her as a dressmaker living at the same address as Montezuma Hurtado.

The couple were married in a civil ceremony in Paris's 5th arrondissement on 19 August 1933.

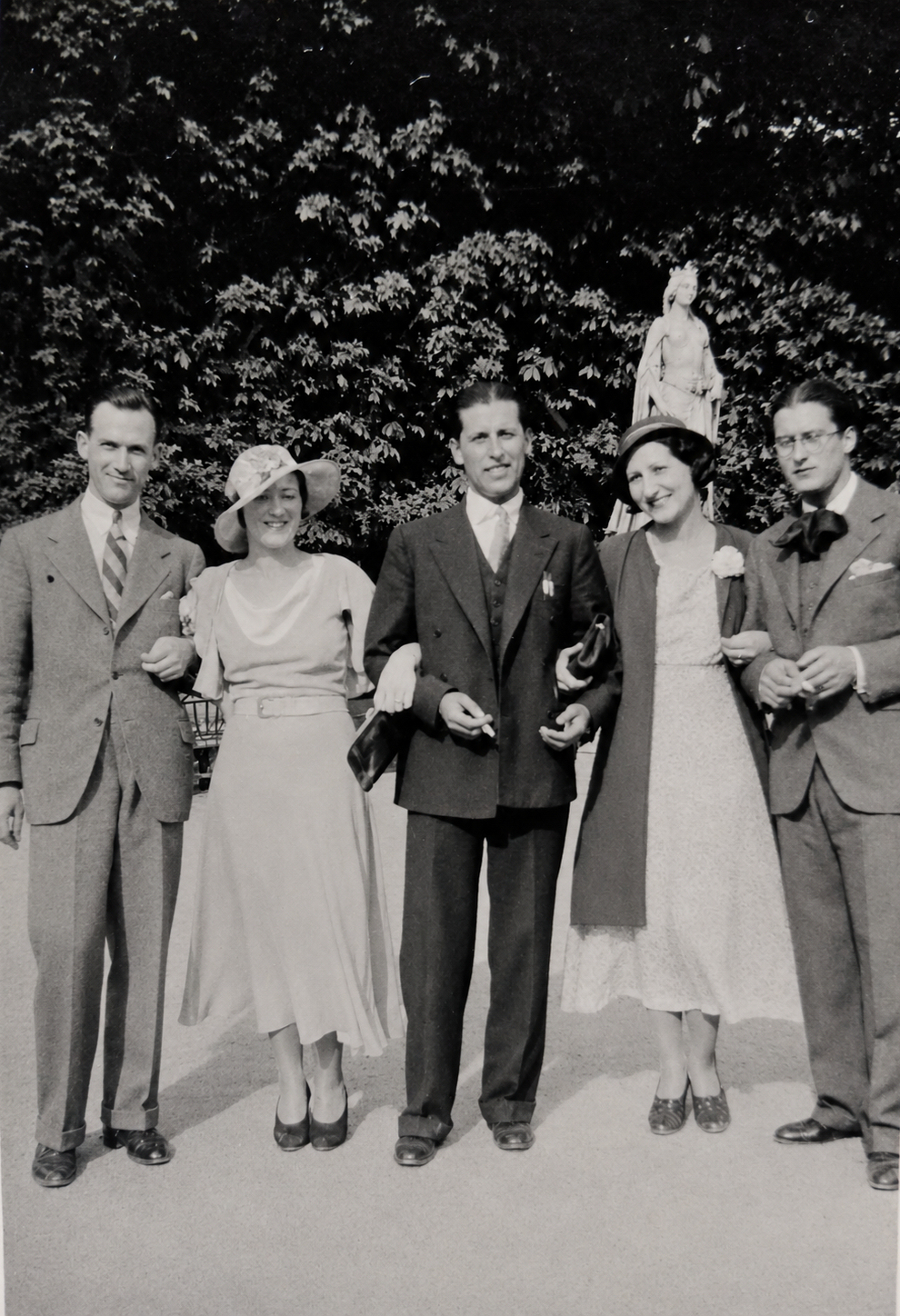
Montezuma Hurtado and Madeleine Clament on their wedding day in Paris, 19 August 1933.

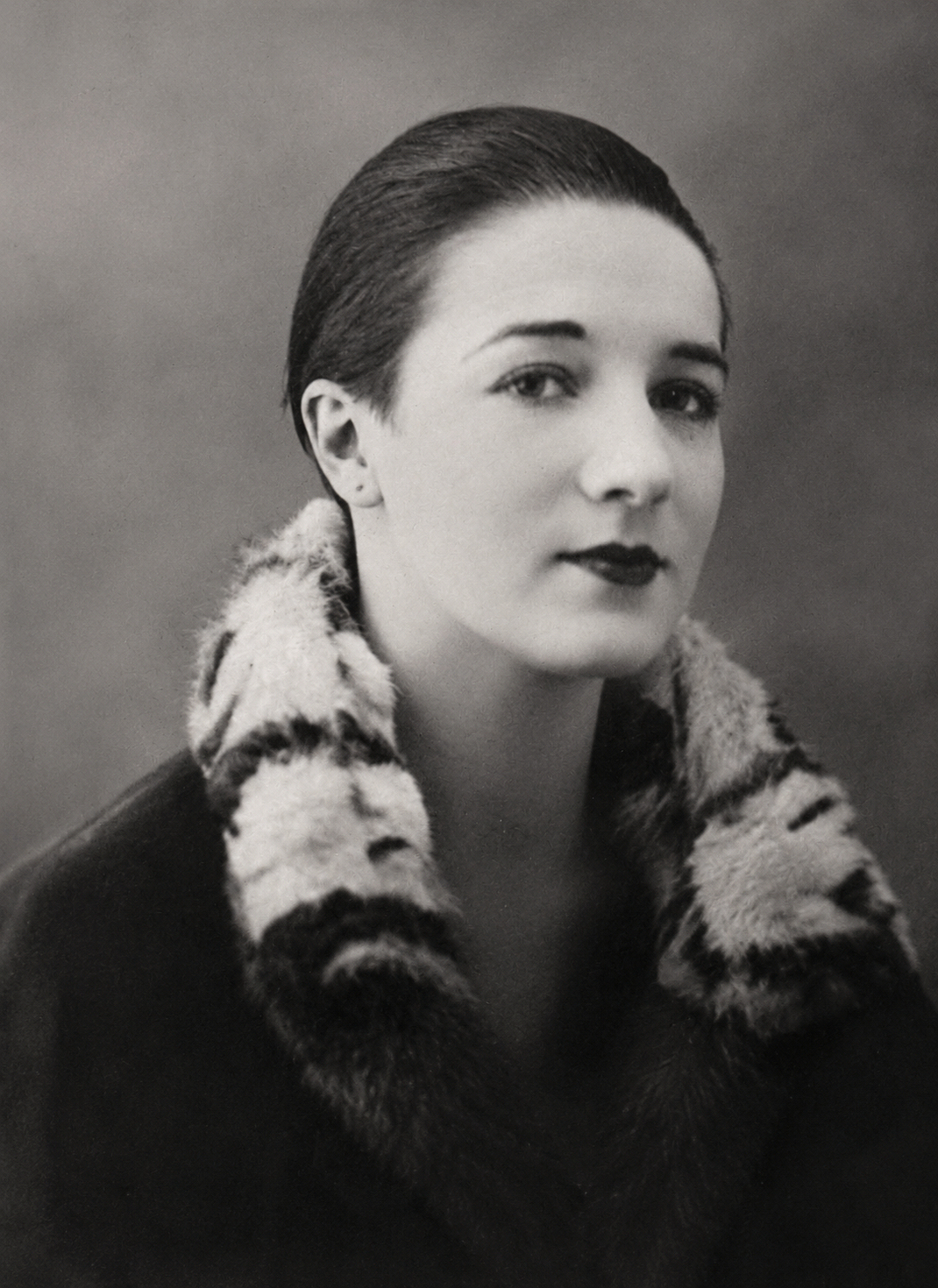
Madeleine Clament (1908–1934), Montezuma Hurtado's first wife.

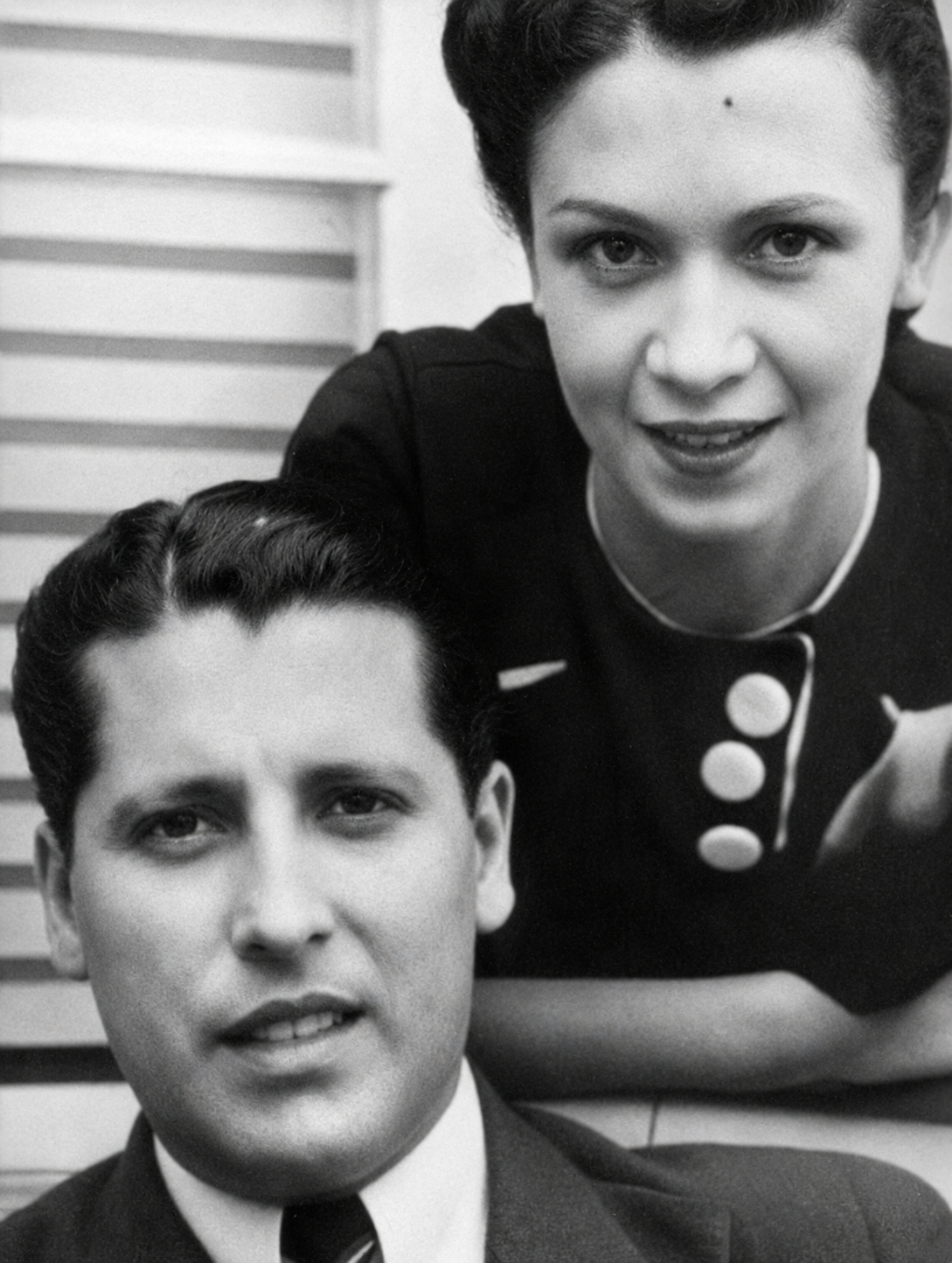
Montezuma Hurtado and his second wife, Elvira Guerrero, c. 1935.

A religious wedding ceremony followed on 24 September 1933 at the Church of Saints Cyril and Methodius in Manhattan, New York City.

Madeleine Clament died in Pasto on 5 July 1934, less than a year after their marriage. Her death received extensive coverage in the Colombian press.

He later married Elvira Guerrero, with whom he had three children: Magdalena, Amparo, and Alberto Montezuma Guerrero.

His daughter Amparo Montezuma Guerrero married the lawyer Alberto Barco Vargas on 6 October 1956. Barco Vargas was the brother of Virgilio Barco Vargas, who later served as President of Colombia.

Alongside his political, journalistic, and public career, Montezuma Hurtado composed several musical works and maintained a lifelong interest in painting. In a 1966 interview with El Tiempo, Amparo Montezuma de Barco stated, "I believe I inherited my love of music from my father." The newspaper also described Montezuma Hurtado as a pianist and composer.

Heriberto Zapata Cuéncar listed Montezuma Hurtado among the principal composers of the Department of Nariño, attributing to him the marches Vida Liberal and General Santander, the dance Melancolía, and the fantasy Canción.

José Menandro Bastidas-España also described Montezuma Hurtado as a composer, writer, historian, and journalist.

Montezuma Hurtado died in Bogotá on 11 February 1987, aged 80. Funeral services were held at San Juan de Ávila Church before his burial at Jardines de Paz Cemetery.

== Public career ==
Following his studies at Columbia University in New York and the École libre des sciences politiques in Paris, Alberto Montezuma Hurtado embarked on a public career that combined political, parliamentary, diplomatic and administrative responsibilities with an active intellectual life as a journalist, historian and writer. Over the following decades, he became one of the leading Liberal Party figures in the Department of Nariño.

On 17 August 1938, he was appointed Governor of the Department of Nariño. During his administration, he initiated an extensive programme of public works in Pasto, including the paving of major streets, the expansion of the city's water supply and sewerage networks, and the construction of the Civil Hospital, later known as the Nariño Departmental Hospital.

During his tenure as Governor of Nariño Department, an outbreak of bartonellosis (Carrion's disease) affected several regions of southern Colombia. Recognizing the importance of a scientific investigation into the epidemic, on 1 September 1939 Montezuma Hurtado sent a telegram to the French parasitologist Émile Brumpt, who was then on a university mission in Colombia, inviting him to visit the affected areas of the department before the beginning of the rainy season.

The telegram, later reproduced by Brumpt in the Annales de parasitologie humaine et comparée, read:

« Votre visite régions notre département affectées par épidémie Bartonellosis aurait pour nous le plus grand intérêt ; je vous prie de considérer la possibilité de faire un voyage avant la saison des pluies qui commence vers la fin septembre. Avec mes remerciements, j'attends votre aimable réponse. — Alberto Montezuma H. Gobernador. »

Brumpt's scientific mission contributed to the study of bartonellosis in Nariño Department, one of the most significant epidemics to affect the region during the twentieth century.

His administration was also marked by an institutional crisis resulting from a dispute between the departmental government and a faction of the Nariño Departmental Assembly. Refusing to reverse decisions taken by his administration, Montezuma Hurtado presided over a period during which two rival departmental assemblies coexisted, an unprecedented episode in the political history of Nariño.

He subsequently served as a member of the Chamber of Representatives and later as a senator. As President of the Senate of Colombia, he signed Law No. 12 of 18 April 1959 approving the Franco-Colombian Convention on the Protection of Literary and Artistic Works, concluded in Bogotá on 28 April 1953. He also signed Law No. 28 of 27 May 1959, incorporating the United Nations Convention on the Prevention and Punishment of the Crime of Genocide into Colombian law.

In April 1962, Montezuma Hurtado was appointed Ambassador Extraordinary and Plenipotentiary of Colombia to Guatemala. Announcing his appointment, El Tiempo emphasised that his selection reflected not only his political experience but also his reputation as a historian, journalist and writer. The newspaper also recalled his service as a Colombian delegate to the United Nations and his participation in several international conferences, describing him as one of Colombia's most distinguished intellectual figures.

Shortly before taking up his post in Guatemala City, the Brazilian Ambassador to Colombia hosted a reception in honour of Montezuma Hurtado and his wife, Elvira Guerrero de Montezuma, who accompanied him throughout his diplomatic mission.

During his years in Guatemala, Montezuma Hurtado developed a diplomatic mission that extended well beyond the formal duties of an ambassador. Alongside his official responsibilities, he promoted Colombian history, literature and culture through lectures, publications and academic activities, viewing cultural exchange as an essential component of international relations. In a retrospective assessment of his mission, El Tiempo later observed that his work as a historian, journalist and writer had become one of the defining features of his diplomatic service.

From the beginning of his appointment, Montezuma Hurtado maintained close relations with Guatemalan political authorities and the diplomatic corps. In September 1962, he hosted a reception at the Colombian Embassy in honour of former Colombian Minister of Foreign Affairs José Joaquín Caicedo Castilla. Among those attending were Guatemalan President Miguel Ydígoras Fuentes, members of the government, representatives of the diplomatic corps and leading public figures. Press coverage also noted the presence of his wife, Elvira Guerrero de Montezuma, and their daughter, Amparo Montezuma de Barco, reflecting the prominent role played by his family in the embassy's official activities.

Although serving abroad, Montezuma Hurtado remained an influential figure within the Colombian Liberal Party. In November 1963, the Liberal Directorate of Nariño unanimously selected him to head the party's list for the Chamber of Representatives, recognising both his political standing and his long-standing service to the department.

Alongside his diplomatic responsibilities, he continued an active literary career. While residing in Guatemala, he published several novels that received favourable reviews and contributed to the dissemination of Colombian literature among Guatemalan intellectual and cultural circles.

His diplomatic work also extended to the promotion of economic relations. In 1967, he participated in the establishment of an organisation intended to promote Colombian exports to the Central American Common Market, reflecting his interest in strengthening commercial ties between Colombia and the countries of the region.

His official duties also included representing Colombia at major public events in Guatemala. Following the Colombian team's victory in the eighth Vuelta a Guatemala in 1964, Montezuma Hurtado sent an official message of congratulations to the national cycling delegation before receiving the riders at the Colombian Embassy in Guatemala City, an event widely covered by El Tiempo.

In August 1970, President Misael Pastrana Borrero appointed Montezuma Hurtado Treasurer General of the Nation. Announcing his appointment, El Tiempo reviewed his career as a journalist, writer, parliamentarian, diplomat and public administrator, emphasising the breadth of his experience in the service of the Colombian state.

In 1972, he published Andanzas de un embajador ("Adventures of an Ambassador"), a work bringing together lectures delivered during his diplomatic mission in Guatemala, together with reflections on relations between Colombia and Central America and on the role of culture in diplomacy. Reviewing the book, El Tiempo observed that his intellectual activity had become one of the defining features of his diplomatic service and had contributed to Colombia's cultural projection in Central America.

== Journalism ==
Journalism occupied a central place in Montezuma Hurtado's public and intellectual life. He founded and directed the daily newspaper El Día and the weekly Crónicas del Domingo, both of which became important forums for political, cultural, and literary debate in the Department of Nariño.

In addition to directing his own newspapers, Montezuma Hurtado contributed articles and essays to several Colombian newspapers. Among his best-known contributions to El Tiempo were Ante el Instituto de Colonización (1953), Crónica de campanas (1955), and Nariño, Tierra e Historia (1969), in which he examined historical, cultural, social, and political subjects.

In 1958, Montezuma Hurtado was interviewed by J. M. Álvarez D'Orsonville for the radio programme Colombia Literaria, now preserved in the Señal Memoria collection of Colombia's public broadcaster RTVC. During the interview, he discussed Colombian political culture, the responsibilities of journalists and intellectuals, and the relationship between literature, history, and public life. Reflecting on the dictatorship of Gustavo Rojas Pinilla, Montezuma Hurtado argued that political violence and the erosion of civic values had seriously damaged Colombian cultural life. He maintained that "no one will ever convince me that the culture of a country progresses when good is replaced by evil and hatred takes the place of love." He also paid tribute to the independent press, describing it as "a great monument to courage and hope" despite censorship, and praised the role played by students, members of the clergy, Colombian women, and the civilian resistance in restoring democratic institutions.

During the interview, he paid tribute to several of the leading intellectuals of the Department of Nariño, including José Rafael Sañudo, whom he credited with restoring Simón Bolívar's "humanity", as well as Leopoldo López Álvarez, Sergio Elías Ortiz, and Ignacio Rodríguez Guerrero, whose scholarship and contributions to Colombian culture he warmly acknowledged.

Discussing his own literary work, Montezuma Hurtado presented several of his published books together with manuscripts that were still awaiting publication. Speaking of Viaje a bordo del viento, he described it as a work "written almost in a state of somnambulism", reflecting aspects of his own life and a period marked both by anarchist sympathies and by an attraction to the spirituality of the Trappists and the Carthusians.

Looking back on his own life, he recalled having worked as a miner, farmer, merchant, cattle breeder, translator, factory worker in New York, and boxing promoter in Pasto before entering public service. Describing himself as "a permanent enemy of all tyrants and all tyrannies", he spoke modestly of his interest in music and painting, calling himself "a little musician and a little painter". He concluded the interview by summarising what he considered the guiding principle of his life: "a thought seeking expression, a pen filled with ink, and a sheet of paper."

In October 1960, Montezuma Hurtado was appointed director of the weekly magazine Semana. Announcing his appointment, El Tiempo described him as an accomplished writer and an experienced journalist, highlighting his long-standing collaboration with the magazine and his extensive knowledge of Colombian public affairs.

== Literary works ==
Alongside his political and journalistic career, Montezuma Hurtado published novels, historical studies, travel writing, and essays on politics and Colombian history. His published works illustrate the breadth of his intellectual interests, ranging from literature and philosophy to national history and public affairs. He was a member of the Colombian Academy of History.

His principal published works included:

== Selected works ==
=== Novels ===
- Ceniza común (1954)
- Piedras preciosas (1964)
- La luz humana (1965)
- El paraíso del diablo (1966)
- Una ciudad desnuda; Sus recuerdos; Un esqueleto en la ventana; and Francisco del Mar (collected edition, 1974)

=== Other literary works ===
- Libro verde (1972)
- Ronda y fin de los tiempos (1974)
- Diario inverosímil
- Jardines de Tebaida
- Rosa de los vientos
- Se ha perdido el arco iris

=== Historical works ===
- La melancolía del Libertador (1942)
- Galería y romance de la historia (1961)
- Nariño: tierra e historia (1969)
- Murales históricos (1972)
- Estampas españolas (1972)
- Antología de la Batalla de Ayacucho (1974)
- Crónica errante (1980)
- Banderas solitarias: vida de Agualongo (1981)
- Cañones y molinos de viento: Nariño y la Campaña del Sur (1982)
- Nariño, tierra y espíritu (1982)
- Comuneros del Paraguay (1983)
- Introducción a la historia de los caminos colombianos (1983)
- Breve historia de Colombia (1984)
