= Pascual Bravo =

President of the Sovereign State of Antioquia from 1863 to 1864

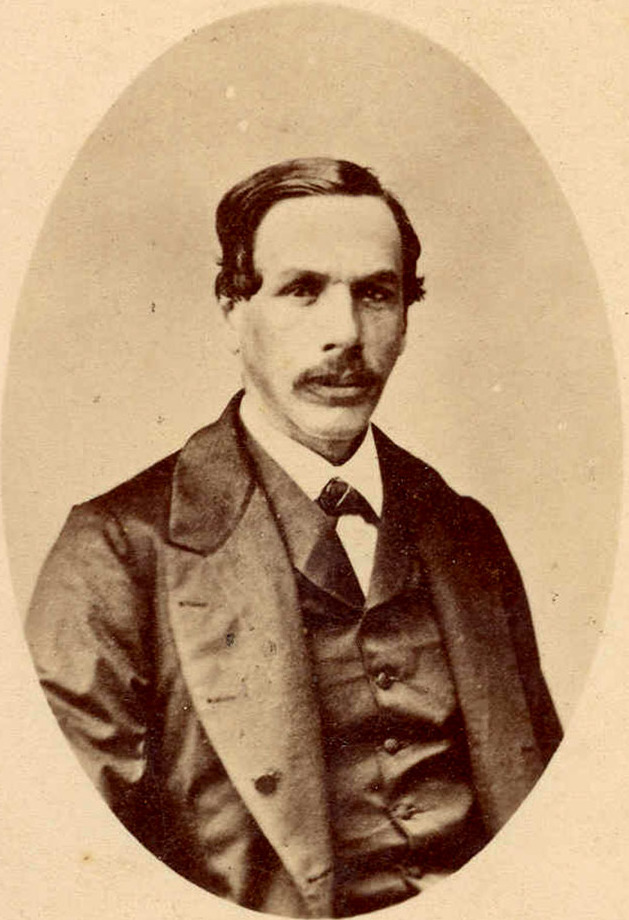

1st President of the Sovereign State of Antioquia
- In office April 20, 1863 – January 4, 1864
- Vice President: Tomás Uribe Santamaría
- Preceded by: Antonio Mendoza Camacho (as Governor of the Federal State of Antioquia)
- Succeeded by: Tomás Uribe Santamaría

Personal details
- Born: Pascual Bravo Echeverrí; July 2, 1838 Rionegro, Antioquia, Republic of New Granada
- Died: January 4, 1864 (aged 25) Marinilla, Antioquia, Colombia
- Resting place: Marinilla Central Cemetery; Marinilla, Antioquia, Colombia
- Party: Liberal
- Profession: Lawyer; civil servant
- Religion: Catholic

Military service
- Branch/service: Antioquia Militia
- Years of service: 1850–1852
- Rank: Dragoneante

Pascual Bravo Echeverrí (July 2, 1838 – January 4, 1864) was a Colombian politician and military man. He was president of the sovereign Antioquia State from 1863 to 1864.

== Biography ==
He studied in Medellín and Sonsón, standing out early as a writer. After finishing high school, he moved to Rionegro to alternate between his agricultural businesses and the study of economics and law. He was part of the Liberal Party and defended his proposals and opposition to the government of Mariano Ospina Rodríguez, from the press; in April 1861 he joined the Liberal army that invaded Antioquia, but was captured by the Conservatives in June of the same year.

In 1862 he was freed, after the victory of the troops of General Tomás Cipriano de Mosquera, who appointed him Prefect of the West (jurisdiction of Santa Fe de Antioquia). He was elected deputy to the Legislature of Antioquia in 1862, which chose him as Third Designate, and in 1863 he was part of the Rionegro Convention, which promulgated the Constitution of the United States of Colombia. He took charge of the Presidency of the State of Antioquia for a few days in January 1863, due to the absence of the incumbent Antonio Mendoza, whom he replaced definitively, after his dismissal, on April 16 of that year. In that election, he defeated Salvador Camacho.

As President, Bravo undertook the recovery of the Casa de la Moneda of Medellín. He also founded the Official State Gazette, a penitentiary and a school of arts and crafts. Due to his anticlerical measures, in line with the national government headed by Mosquera, they provoked the formation of an armed opposition from the Conservative Party. In the Battle of Cascajos, near Marinilla, President Pascual Bravo was hit by a bullet and died in battle.
