= Colombian Civil War (1884–1885) =

Wa in the United States of Colombia

Colombian Civil War of 1884–85
- Part of the Colombian Civil Wars
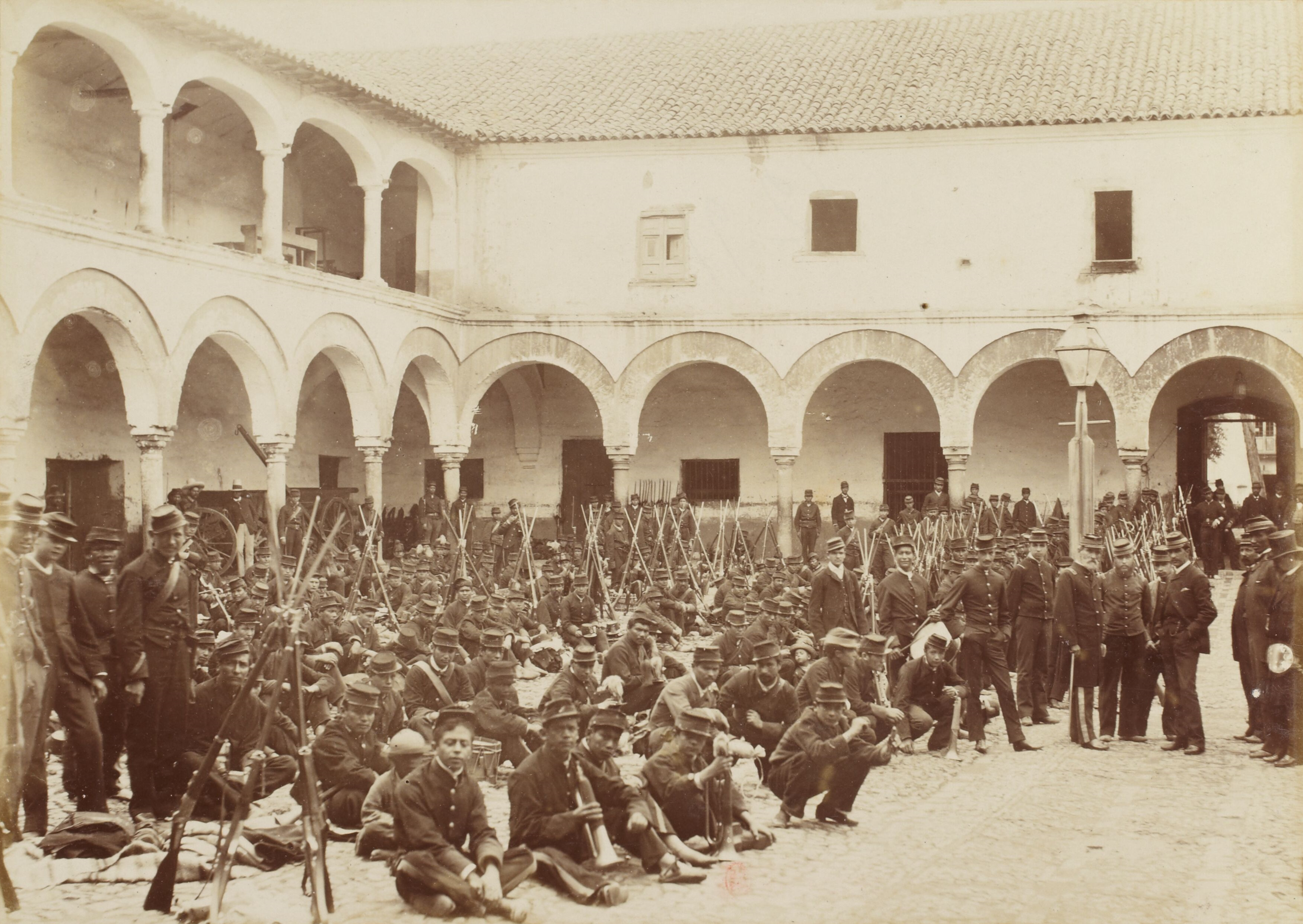
- Colombian Government soldiers around 1880
Date	August 1884 – November 1885
Location	United States of Colombia
Result	Government victory

Belligerents
(Colombia) Government; Conservative party Liberal Moderates	Liberal Radicals

Commanders and leaders
(Colombia) Rafael Núñez (Colombia) Campo Serrano (Colombia) Rafael Reyes Prieto (Colombia) Quintero Calderón (Colombia) Eliseo Payán	Guillermo Marquez; Luciano Restrepo; Ricardo Gaitán Obeso; Rafael Uribe Uribe

Casualties and losses
- More than 10,000 killed

The Colombian Civil War of 1884–1885 was a conflict that took place in the United States of Colombia (present-day Colombia and Panama). It was the result of the reaction of the Radical faction of the Colombian Liberal Party, which did not agree with the Centralist Regeneration policy of President Rafael Núñez, a moderate Liberal who was supported by the Colombian Conservative Party.

== Background ==
The Radical liberals, who were in power in the Sovereign State of Santander, accused Rafael Núñez, President of the United States of Colombia of interfering in the internal affairs of the States with his Centralist policies and Regeneration project.

== Course of events ==
In August 1884, armed uprisings began in the state of Santander, directed against the state president, Solon Wilches. On 11 January 1885, the Tuluá Uprising took place in Cauca, which was suppressed by General Juan Evangelista Ulloa. However, General Francisco Escobar and Colonel Guillermo Marquez went over to the side of the rebels in Buenaventura, along with all their troops and the most modern weapons in the country.

On 30 January, the battle of Hatoviejo took place, and on 7 February, the battle of Vijes, in which Ulloa again defeated Marquez. Near Roldanillo, Colonel Rafael Reyes again defeated Marquez, who lost all his weapons and was forced to flee to Cartago with only 25 men.
In Cartago, Marquez united with the rebel forces of generals Valentin Deas and Manuel Antonio Angel, in command of 3,000 soldiers. These troops came from the Sovereign State of Antioquia, whose governor, Luciano Restrepo, had also rebelled against Nunez.

On 23 February, the Battle of Santa Barbara de Cartago (es) took place, which lasted for 10 hours. In this battle, Government forces inflicted a major defeat on the rebels, who lost about 500 killed and 1,000 wounded. Nevertheless, numerous battles continued throughout the country after this.

In April 1885, the Panama crisis of 1885 erupted. When most of the government troops had left the state of Panama to fight in Colombia, a rebellion broke out in Panama and a small US fleet arrived in support of the rebels. When Chile, which supported the Colombian Government, sent the protected cruiser Esmeralda to Panama City, the United States withdrew from Panama and the Colombian government retook control of the city on 30 April.

After the decisive Battle of La Humareda (es) on 17 June in the Bolívar Department, the Colombian Civil War finally ended in November 1885 with the surrender of generals Focion Soto and Siervo Sarmiento. At a rally in Bogotá following the victory at the Battle of La Humareda, President Núñez had declared: “The Constitution of 1863 is no longer valid.”

== Consequences ==
The triumph of the Government forces served as a pretext for President Núñez to announce the end of the validity of the Constitution of 1863, which had been inspired by Liberal radicalism. He launched a profound constitutional reform that concluded with the adoption of the Colombian Constitution of 1886.

== Sources ==
- La Guerra Civil de 1885: Núñez y la derrota del radicalismo, by Gonzalo España, Ancora Editores, 1985 .
