= 1875–76 Colombian presidential election =

Presidential elections were held in the United States of Colombia in 1875 and 1876. The electors were elected in 1875 and elected the president the following year. The result was a victory for Aquileo Parra of the Liberal Party.

== Electoral system ==
The 1863 constitution changed the electoral system from a direct vote to an indirect vote. The President was now elected on the basis of which candidate received the most votes in each state, with a candidate required to win in at least five of the nine states to be elected. If no candidate received a majority, Congress would elect the President from the main contenders.

== Results ==
In Cauca Rafael Núñez won a majority of the vote, but the election jury refused to recognise his victory. However, it also refused to give its college vote to Parra, and so announced that the state's electors would not take part in the presidential ballot. For the first time, no candidate won a majority of states, and as a result, Congress elected the President on 21 February.

Candidate	Party	States won	Congressional vote
Aquileo Parra	Liberal Party	4	48
Rafael Núñez	Liberal Party	2	18
Bartolomé Calvo	Conservative Party	2	18
Did not vote		1	–
Total		9	84
Source: Park, The Library
