= Concordat of 1887 (Colombia) =

1887 treaty between the Vatican and Colombia

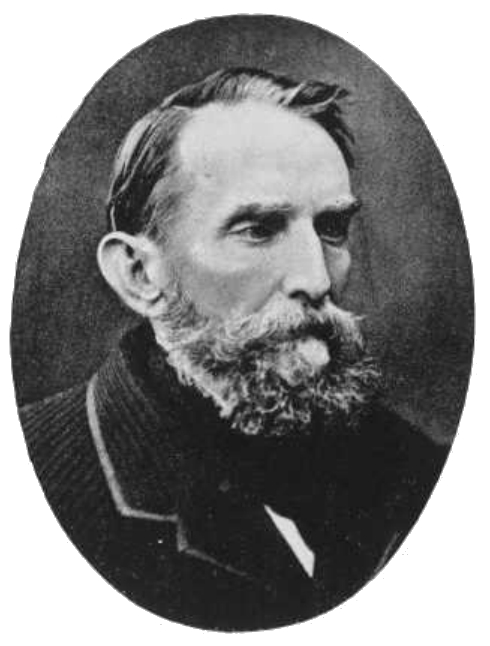
President Rafael Nunez's Regeneration (La Regeneration) sought to re-establish the clerical ties to government and education. The Concordat was the legal institutionalization in treaty form of the Regeneration policies.

The Concordat of 1887 was a treaty signed by the President of the Republic of Colombia, Rafael Núñez, and by the Vatican State under Pope Leo XIII on December 31, 1887. It recognized Catholicism as the official religion of Colombia and gave major concessions to the Catholic Church. The treaty had a lasting effect on the relations of the Colombian State and Church. Most of its provisions were reversed through the 20th Century.

Following the defeat of the Radical Liberals and their prohibition to establish a Concordat with the Holy See, Rafael Núñez sought to reinstate and reverse the separation of State and Church in the period known as "La Regeneración". The Treaty was modeled in the Spanish colonial empire tradition of the "Patronato Regio" (Royal Patronage). It returned the authority of the church over previously expropriated land, buildings and compensation from the expulsion by the Radical Liberals (1853) and added authority over birth and death registry, municipal and public cemetery management, marriage, forbade divorce, and provided for the church to impart education and determine educational contents including censorship that extended to film in the beginning of the 20th Century. It also provided for catholic missions in "barbaric tribes" not to require Congress approval and made bishops immune to the State's jurisdiction making them subject solely to Canon Law. In turn, the President could veto the candidates for the archbishop and episcopal posts throughout the republic.
