= Regeneration (Colombia) =

Political movement

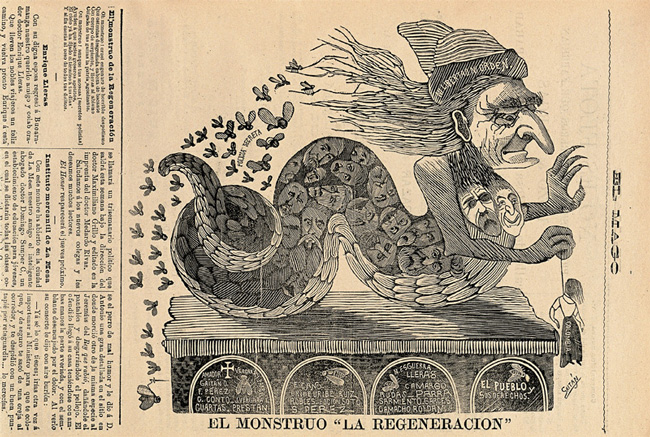
The dragon has the face of Regeneration president Manuel Antonio Sanclemente. Vice president José Manuel Marroquín has "the tragedy" written on his chest. An unidentified person is "the comedy". The nation of Colombia is the woman hanging from the rope, held by a monster. The faces of former president and Regeneration ideologue Rafael Núñez and other notable members of that movement are the scales of the monster. The swarm of bees, the secret police, follow the monster who moves on top of a sarcophagus with four tombstones bearing the names of the victims of government persecution. The hat reads "Neither Freedom nor Order" a reference to the motto of Colombia "Freedom and Order".

The Regeneration (Spanish: La Regeneración) was a political movement that emerged in Colombia in the late second half of the 19th century, led by Rafael Núñez. Its goal was to reverse the social and legal implications of the Radical Olympus (Olimpo Radical) era of the 1863 Constitution of Rionegro which established the United States of Colombia, made the country a federal republic and enforced the separation of church and state. The motto of Regeneration was "one nation, one goal, one God" (una nación, un lema, un Dios).

The movement was mainly constituted by members of the Conservative Party and the moderate faction of the Liberal Party and opposed the incumbent Radical Liberals. After the civil war of 1876, President Aquileo Parra was the last leader of the so-called "Olimpo Radical era" (Radical Olympus). Parra was followed by General Julián Trujillo, who in 1878 had won the support of the moderate faction of the liberal party. At the moment, Núñez was the leader of the majority of congress in his address in the inauguration of Trujillo on April 1, 1878, he stated: "We have arrived at a point at which we are confronting exactly this dilemma: fundamental administrative regeneration, or catastrophe."

== Background ==
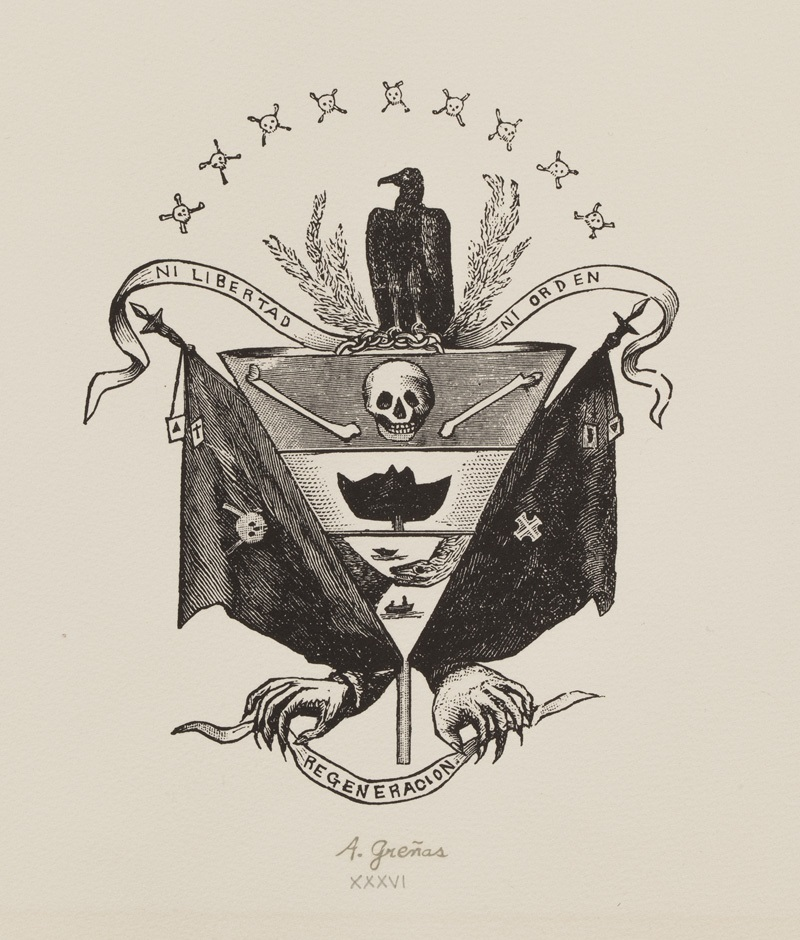
Satirical version of Colombian coat of arms under Regeneration leadership. "Neither Freedom nor Order" mocking the motto of the republic, Freedom and Order. Instead of the Andean Condor of the original coat of arms a vulture. Instead of the cornucopiae, two femur bones. The pomegranate is replaced by a cranium, the Phrygian cap was replaced by a pirate hat and the Isthmus of Panama was replaced by a beast devouring two ships.

Since 1858, Colombia was a federal republic, first, under the name Granadine Confederation and later as the United States of Colombia. The 1863 Constitution of Rionegro applied radical liberal principles. It gave great autonomy to the states, assured the freedom of the press, enterprise, association, bearing and trade of arms and mobility to and from the country. It also proclaimed the state as secular, it abolished the death penalty and reduced the power of the executive branch, limiting the terms of office to two years and gave almost all powers of government to the legislature.

Regeneration is the ideologic definition of the contentious dispute between the two main parties to dispute power Centralists and Christian Conservatives versus Federalists and pro-secular government Liberals.

During the Radical Liberals rule there were advances in education with the founding of the National University of Colombia in 1867, on infrastructure (railroads) and communications (telegraph). Although, Regeneration supporters complained that extreme federalism was the cause of the frequent civil wars among states and the lack of centralized power and also caused the split of the Liberal Party in Radicals and Moderates.

Once in power, the Regeneration movement introduced reforms that ultimately led to summoning an assembly of delegates to write a new constitution. On August 8, 1885, Núñez, from the San Carlos Palace, declared that the Constitution of Rionegro of 1863 "had ceased to exist."

== Colombian Constitution of 1886 ==
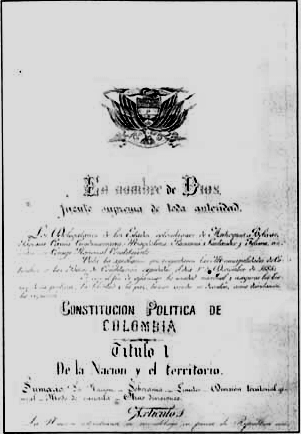
Cover of the Constitution of 1886

Signed on August 5, 1886, the Constitution of 1886 was the greatest achievement of Regneration. But because its final written document did not reflect the democratic leanings of Núñez but instead the more authoritarian thesis of vice-president Miguel Antonio Caro, Núñez retreated from the presidency in April, so he would not have to sign it. Instead, José María Campo Serrano had to put it into effect.

Regeneration established the basis for the return of a protectionist state, in which the central government, was again endowed with the powers enumerated within the 1863 Constitution of Rionegro. The government became responsible for import and export policy as well as monetary policy with the creation of the National Bank in 1880 (A precursor of the Bank of the Republic) and the fixation of tariffs and revenue. With the National Bank, the financial bourgeoisie loss control of borrowing and usury and many were at a financial loss with the change from the gold standard to a fiat currency–based system.

Administratively, in the new Constitution, States (Estados) were renamed Departments (Departamentos) and less developed units were renamed Intendencias and Comisarías, all ruled from the capital, Bogotá, with governors, mayors and Intendentes appointed by the President, turning the federal system into a centralist unitary regime. The presidential term became six years and the power of the executive was increased making the president an almost absolutist monarch. The death penalty was reinstated and sustained until the Constitutional Reform of 1910.

== Concordat of 1887 ==
Although Núñez's Constitution of 1886 assured freedom of religion, it also named Catholicism the official religion of Colombia. Moreover, with the signing of a new Concordat in 1887 with the Catholic Church restored and increased the privileges, salaries, lands and properties previously expropriated by the Radical Liberals when the church was expelled from the country (1858). Additionally, the new Concordat reversed the separation of church and state and gave the church the role of imparting education and censoring educational materials for all education in the country. It also gave the church the administration of birth and death certifications, public and municipal cemeteries, official marriage and forbade divorce. It also made clerics immune to prosecution by national courts making them subject only to the jurisdiction of Canon Law.

== Legacy ==
Towards the end of the century, factions emerged within Regeneration. José María Samper and Rafael Núñez were for a moderate Regeneration while vice-president Miguel Antonio Caro on the Conservative faction sought a more authoritarian, conservative and clerical. The latter prevailed and excluded the Liberals from the political scene for the following four decades in what became known as the Conservative Hegemony era. Nevertheless, the sweeping reforms of Regeneration also caused resistance which became the precursor to the Civil War of 1895 and the Coup of 1900 and the ensuing chaos (of which the Thousand Days' War was accessory) and played a role in the secession of Panama from Colombia.

Additionally the continuous abridgment of rights by the ruling conservative party and the use of government forces against the opposition, the suppression of the press and laws like the Law of the Horses (Ley de los Caballos or Ley 61 de 1888) which permitted the administrative repression of what the executive deemed contrary to public order or property and impose imprisonment, banishment or loss of political rights without court or trial. Contemporary commentators such as Pedro Juan Navarro, spoke of "45 years of Conservative dictatorship."

Further measures to disenfranchise and limit access to voting as well as rigging elections with the pre-election conscription gravely impacted the composition of congress and effectively excluded liberals from government in what became the playbook of using official measures to impact the outcome of elections. While the population was nearly even split among liberals and conservatives there was only one liberal in both chambers of congress between 1892 and 1896 and another between 1896 and 1900 or just 642 electors over a total 3,941, making congress not representative of the composition of the population.

Besides direct intimidation of the opposition the constitution of 1886 ended universal suffrage and restricted it to males over 21 years of age, literate, with a yearly income of at least $500 pesos of the day and estate valued at $1500 or more. Additionally to the right of vote of the Army for which pre-electoral rush conscription aimed at giving advantage to the party in office.

The use of repression and rebuff of the opposing party became the way in which the governing party would abuse power which escalated in partisan violence throughout the 20th century.
