= Colombian Civil War of 1876 =

1876–77 Liberal-Conservative civil war

Colombian Civil War of 1876-1877 (guerra civil colombiana de 1876-1877)
- Part of the Colombian Civil Wars
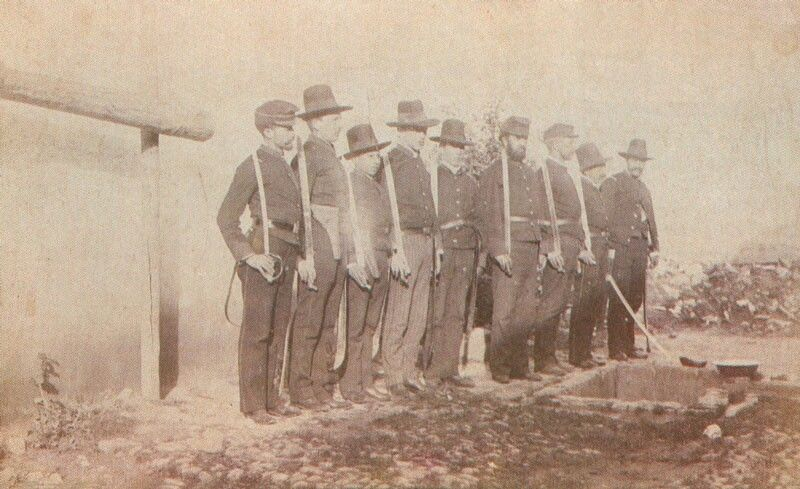
- conservative guerrillas
Date	July 9, 1876 – May 25, 1877
Location	United States of Colombia
Result	liberal government victory

Belligerents
United States of Colombia; Liberals; Federal states: Cundinamarca; Bolívar; Magdalena; Panamá; Santander; Boyacá	Conservatives; Federal states: Antioquia; Cauca; Tolima

Commanders and leaders
Aquileo Parra; César Conto; Julián Trujillo; Santos Acosta; Sergio Camargo; Tomás Rengifo; Fernando Ponce; Joaquín Reyes; Daniel Aldana; Rafael Uribe Uribe	Recaredo de Villa; Antonio Basilio Cuervo; Sergio Arboleda; Miguel Arroyo Hurtado; Joaquín María Córdova; Marceliano Vélez; Leonardo Canal González; Manuel Briceño; Manuel Casablanca; Felipe Farias; Alejandro Posada; Francisco de Paula Madriñan

Units involved
Source can vary between 30,000–25,000–24,000 government troops	Source can vary between 20,000–16,000 conservatives
- Some 1,000–10,000 deaths (likely 9,000). Some estimates speak of 80,000 deaths in the 1879 uprising.

The Colombian Civil War of 1876 (also called War of the Schools) was a civil war in the United States of Colombia (present-day Colombia) that went on from 1876 to 1877. The causes of the war date back to approximately 1870, when members of the Colombian Liberal Party led by Eustorgio Salgar attempted to introduce public education for the Colombian states, while the Colombian Conservative Party advocated for putting education solely under the control of the Roman Catholic church.

== Antecedent ==
Its origin was the discontent of the conservatives for the secularizing measures adopted in education and for the openly anti-religious and anti-clerical spirit of the radicals. The government in power would have invited a German Mission to transform teaching methods in schools, until then controlled by the Catholic Church. This secularist initiative failed when the Church promoted resistance from conservative factions, which would end up sparking inter-partisan violence once again, blocking the attempt to secularize education.

== War ==
At the beginning of 1876, in the government of Aquileo Parra, the Church continued to refuse to cede the monopoly of education and, in July 1876, war finally broke out in the Cauca State, which hardened in the following months, and spread to the States of Antioquia, Tolima, Cundinamarca and Santander.

The liberal troops, who defend the radical government of Aquileo Parra, were under the orders of generals Julián Trujillo Largacha, Santos Acosta, Sergio Camargo and Tomás Rengifo. The conservative troops were led by generals Leonardo Canal González, Manuel Briceño, Manuel Casablanca, Sergio Arboleda and Marceliano Vélez.

On August 31, 1876, General Trujillo won the Battle of Los Chancos in the state of Cauca, where 24 to 25,000 liberals opposed 16 to 20,000 conservatives. There were between 200 and 770 dead on the conservative and 212 to 300 deaths on the liberal side.

The Battle of Guarrapata, in Tolima State, which took place between November 19 and 22, 1876, saw 12,000 combatants clash, leaving 1,319 dead and 190 wounded.

During the battle of Mutiscua (State of Santander), on December 9, 1876, 1,200 liberals confronted 1,000 conservatives, leaving 24 dead.

In La Donjuana (State of Santander), on January 27, 1877, 4,900 liberals fought against 4,000 conservatives. The liberals counted between 110 and 500 dead and the conservatives 250. Other minor fighting took place in Tequia (32 dead) and Cúcuta (6 dead).

== Consequences ==
The war ultimately saw the victory of the liberals and the retention of Aquileo Parra as president of the United States of Colombia. General Julián Trujillo Largacha, the most successful general of the war, was elected president in the following election and took office on April 1, 1878.

== See also ==
- Wars involving Colombia
