= Rafael Núñez =

President of Colombia (1887–1888, 1892–1894)

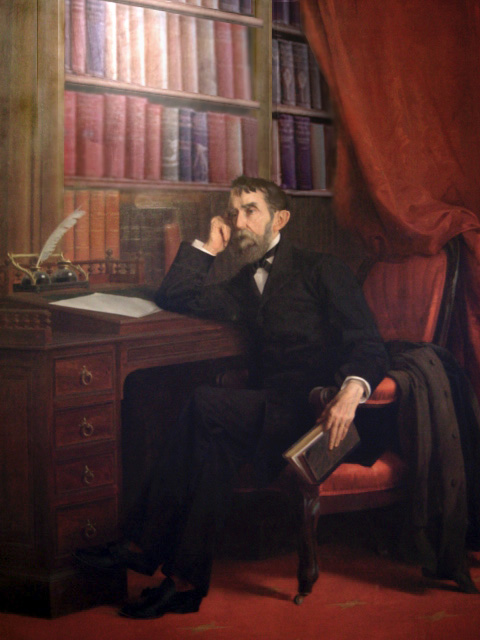
- 1891 painting

1st and 3rd President of Colombia
- In office August 7, 1892 – September 18, 1894
- Vice President: Miguel Antonio Caro
- Preceded by: Carlos Holguín Mallarino
- Succeeded by: Miguel Antonio Caro
- In office June 4, 1887 – August 7, 1888
- Vice President: Eliseo Payán
- Preceded by: Office established
- Succeeded by: Carlos Holguín Mallarino

10th and 14th President of the United States of Colombia
- In office April 1, 1884 – April 1, 1886
- Preceded by: José Eusebio Otalora
- Succeeded by: Office abolished
- In office April 8, 1880 – April 1, 1882
- Preceded by: Julián Trujillo Largacha
- Succeeded by: Francisco Javier Zaldúa

12th and 15th President of the Sovereign State of Bolívar
- In office 1879–1880
- Preceded by: Benjamin Noguera
- Succeeded by: Benjamin Noguera
- In office 1876–1877
- Preceded by: Eugenio Baena
- Succeeded by: Manuel González Carazo

Personal details
- Born: Rafael Wenceslao Núñez Moledo; September 25, 1825 Cartagena de Indias, Bolívar, Colombia
- Died: September 18, 1894 (aged 68) Cartagena de Indias, Bolívar, Colombia
- Resting place: El Cabrero Hermitage, Cartagena de Indias
- Party: Liberal Party (1848-1886); National Party (1886-1894)
- Spouses: Dolores Gallegos (m. 1851; div. 1872); Soledad Román Polanco (m. 1877)
- Education: University of Cartagena
- Profession: Lawyer
- Nickname: El Regenerador

Military service
- Allegiance: Colombia (Liberal Party)
- Branch/service: National Army of Colombia
- Battles/wars: War of the Supremes

Rafael Wenceslao Núñez Moledo (September 28, 1825 – September 18, 1894) was a Colombian author, lawyer, journalist and politician, who was elected president of Colombia in 1880 and in 1884. Núñez was the leader of the so-called "Regeneration" process which produced the Colombian Constitution of 1886 which was to remain until 1991.

== Early life ==
Núñez was the first of three children of cousins Dolores García Moledo and Colonel Francisco Núñez García, who were married on October 6, 1824. At 15, he was accepted by General Francisco Carmona in the rebel troops to fight in the War of the Supremes.

Little is known about the early years of Núñez, but he certainly served as a Circuit Judge in Chiriquí, Panama, in 1848.

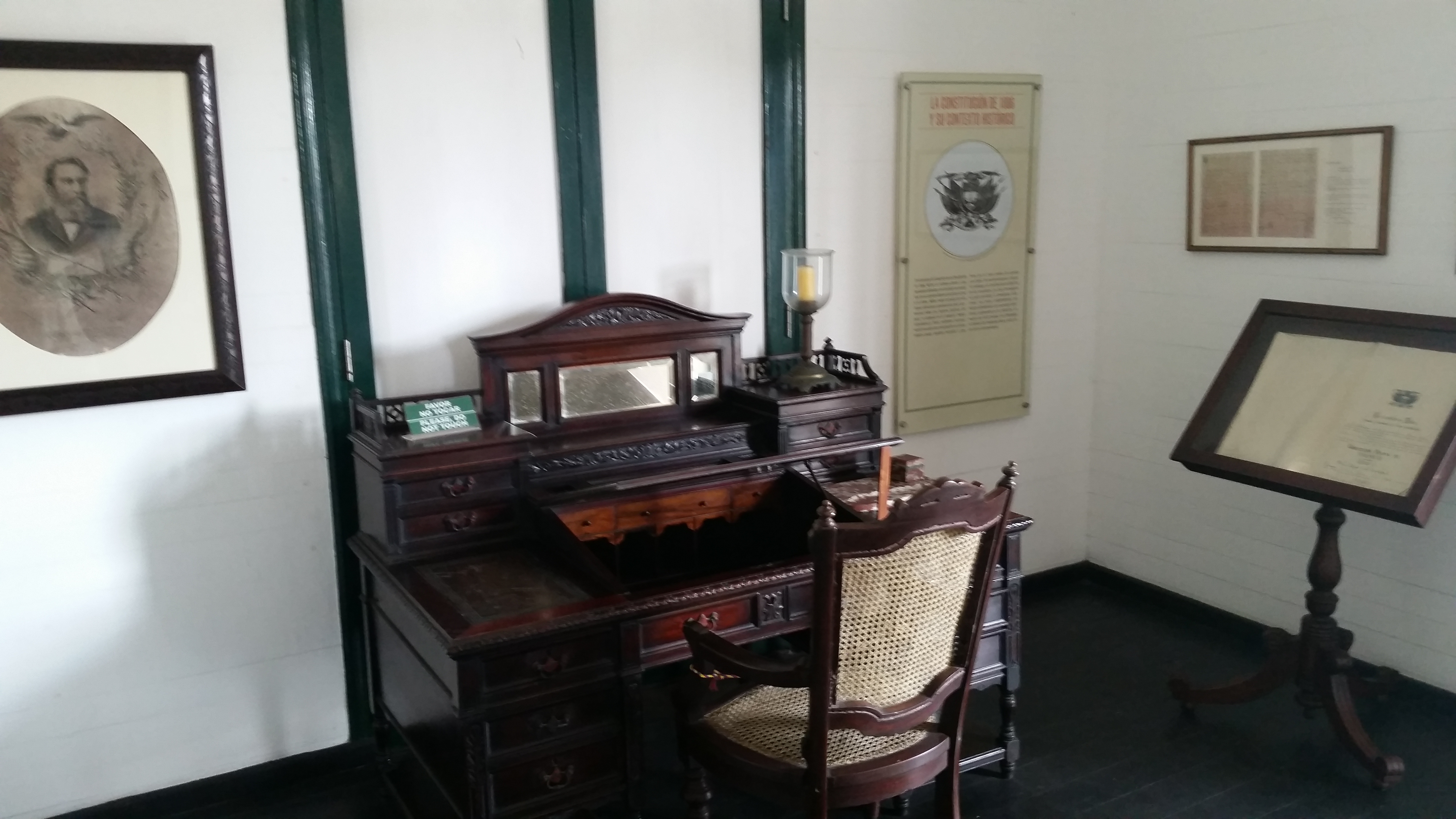
Rafael Núñez study

== Political career ==
It is known that Núñez participated as a 15-year-old in the War of the Supremes (1840), the first of many Colombian civil wars, which was caused by the military uprising of a number of political leaders (the "Supremes") in the provinces in the South of the country against the centralist and conservative government of José Ignacio de Márquez. Núñez joined the revolutionary side and participated in the siege of his own hometown, Cartagena. Following the war, he entered college and obtained a degree in law from the Universidad del Magdalena e Istmo in 1844. By 1848, Núñez had founded in Cartagena, Colombia, the newspaper La Democracia, with the intention of promoting the presidential election of General José María Obando, the leader of the insurrection in the War of the Supremes, as a successor to José Hilario López. The same year, Obando had been elected as governor of the Province of Cartagena and he appointed Núñez as Chief of Staff in Cartagena's government, thus beginning his political life. He would maintain the position until 1853, with Obando as president, when he decided to move to Bogotá to become a member of the Colombian Congress, and where he made a name for himself by fighting the federalist and socialist ideas of Manuel Murillo Toro. Following the coup against Obando in 1854 by José María Melo, Núñez went into hiding, but then was elected as governor of the department of Bolívar, which contributed to the defeat of Melo. The newly appointed president Manuel María Mallarino made Núñez, minister (secretary) of War in 1855, and then Minister of the Treasury. His excellent results as Minister of Treasury would bring him wide recognition. In 1855, he also published his first volume of political essays, under the name of La Federación.

Later, under the government of Tomás Cipriano de Mosquera, he served as Minister of the Treasury. After participating briefly in the Convention of Ríonegro which would produce the Constitution of Rionegro as a representative of the state of Panama, he decided to leave the country in 1863. He first lived in New York City for two years, writing for a number of newspapers both in Colombia and in Spain. Then, he was appointed consul of the United States of Colombia in Le Havre by president Murillo Toro, and later, he was appointed as the Colombian Consul in Liverpool.

He was a candidate in the 1875–76 Colombian presidential election.

He returned to Colombia in 1876 at the center of a political fight. He had been nominated as a candidate for the presidency that year but did not win the election. He was elected as a senator for the State of Bolívar, however. From 1878 to 1888, he wrote hundreds of influential articles related to the constitutional reform for the newspapers La Luz and La Nación of Bogota, and 'El Porvenir' and El Impulso of Cartagena. He also wrote the lyrics for the Colombian national anthem.

He was elected President of Colombia for the 1880–1882 presidential term. Again, in 1884, he was re-elected President of Colombia with the support of the Conservative Party, promoting a movement that he called the "Regeneration".

=== Third presidential term and the Constitution of 1886 ===
He was the force behind La Regeneración (Regeneration) movement of 1884 and the new Constitution for Colombia of 1886. The Regeneration program advanced by Núñez opposed most liberal reforms established in the Constitution of Rionegro, and its victory changed the country from a decentralized federal system to a centralized system with a strong central presidency. Opposing the conservative and centralist tendencies in Núñez proposal, liberal leaders issued yet another civil war in 1884 and 1885. The conservative forces in favor of president Núñez finally surrendered the liberal troops in 1885, which led to Núñez' famous proclamation: "Sirs, the Constitution of 1863 is no more." Following this military victory, on September 10, 1885, Núñez summoned two representatives from each of the sovereign states to initiate the Constituent Assembly, which was installed on November 11 of the same year.

The constitutional reform of 1886, carried out with the collaboration of Miguel Antonio Caro, was possibly the most outstanding political feat of Núñez. This Colombian Constitution of 1886, with some later modifications, was in effect until the proclamation of a new one in 1991, and in addition to reestablishing a strong Centralist form of government, changing the name of the country from the United States of Colombia to that of Republic of Colombia, it also reestablished the links with the Vatican, and made Catholicism the official religion, leaving education in the hands of the Catholic church. The Constitution also changed the duration of presidential terms from two to six years, left the election of the president of the Republic to the Congress, and changed the old states into Departments which would be ruled by a governor appointed by the president of the Republic, hence giving a lot of power to the president.

He was again re-elected to be President of Colombia in 1886 and in 1892 but did not take office for his last term. He had moved back to Cartagena by then as his health deteriorated. Rather, his vice-president, Miguel Antonio Caro was sworn in as the de facto president for the presidential term of 1892–1898. While his contact with the central government was thus only indirect, Núñez remained an important political figure, and his letters and columns and essays were very influential. Moreover, many political figures of the time went to visit him constantly in Cartagena. His health continued worsening and he finally died on September 18, 1894, following a fever that left him in bed and speechless for a couple of days. Núñez died being officially appointed as president.

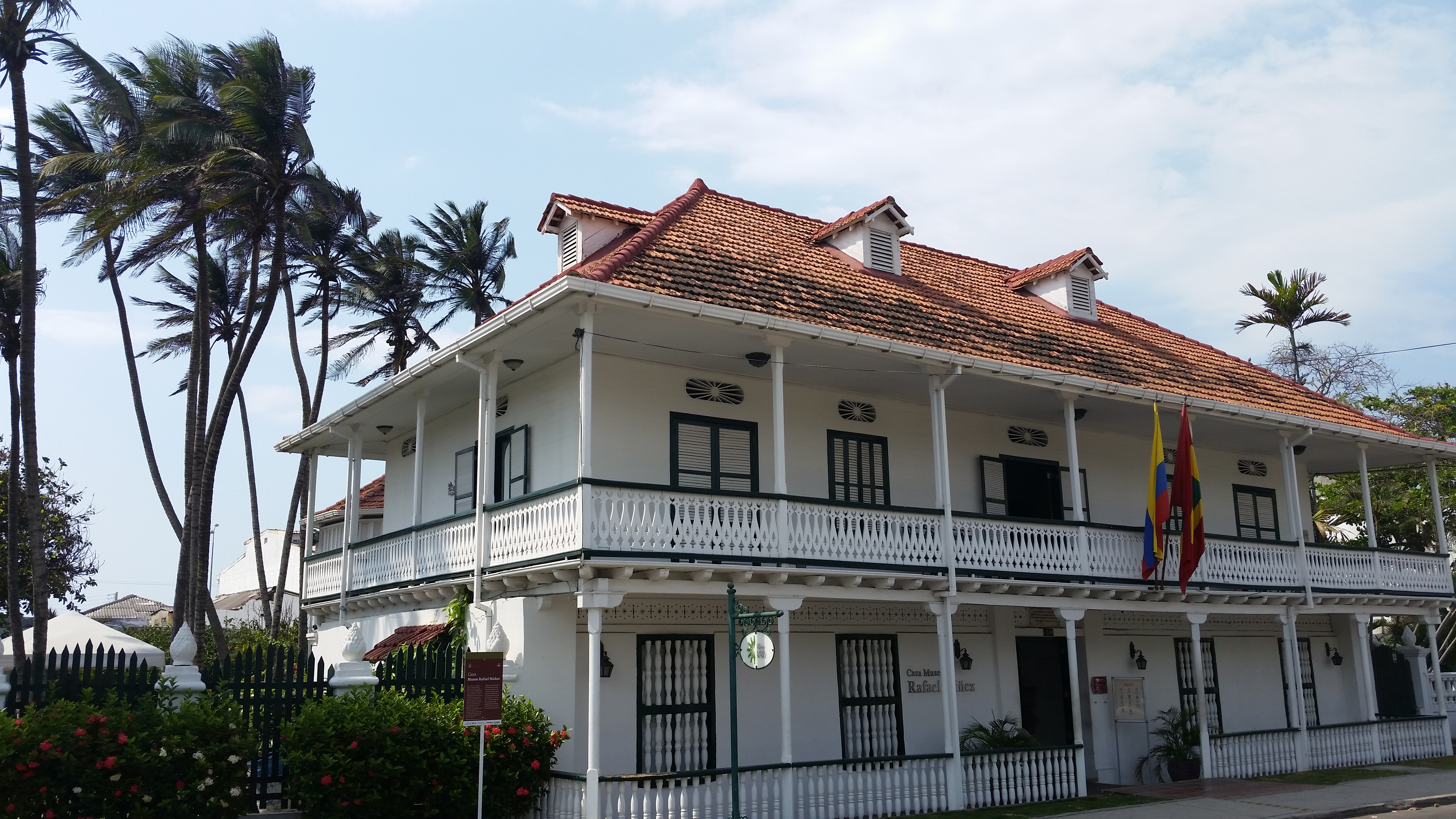
Rafael Núñez home

== Legacy ==
In his first administration, Núñez restored peace and order, which brought him wide popularity. He allowed the Catholic bishops, who were in exile, to return to the country. He created the Military Academy and the National Academy of Music. He inaugurated the international telegraph service. He re-established diplomatic relationships with Spain, which had been severed since the War of Independence. Also, he signed international treaties of commerce and cultural exchange with France and the United Kingdom.

During his second administration, Núñez sponsored, championed and enacted a major and fundamental overhaul of the nation's political structure, which ended with the adoption and enactment of the new Constitution of the Republic of Colombia, which came to be known as the Colombian Constitution of 1886.

== Literature ==
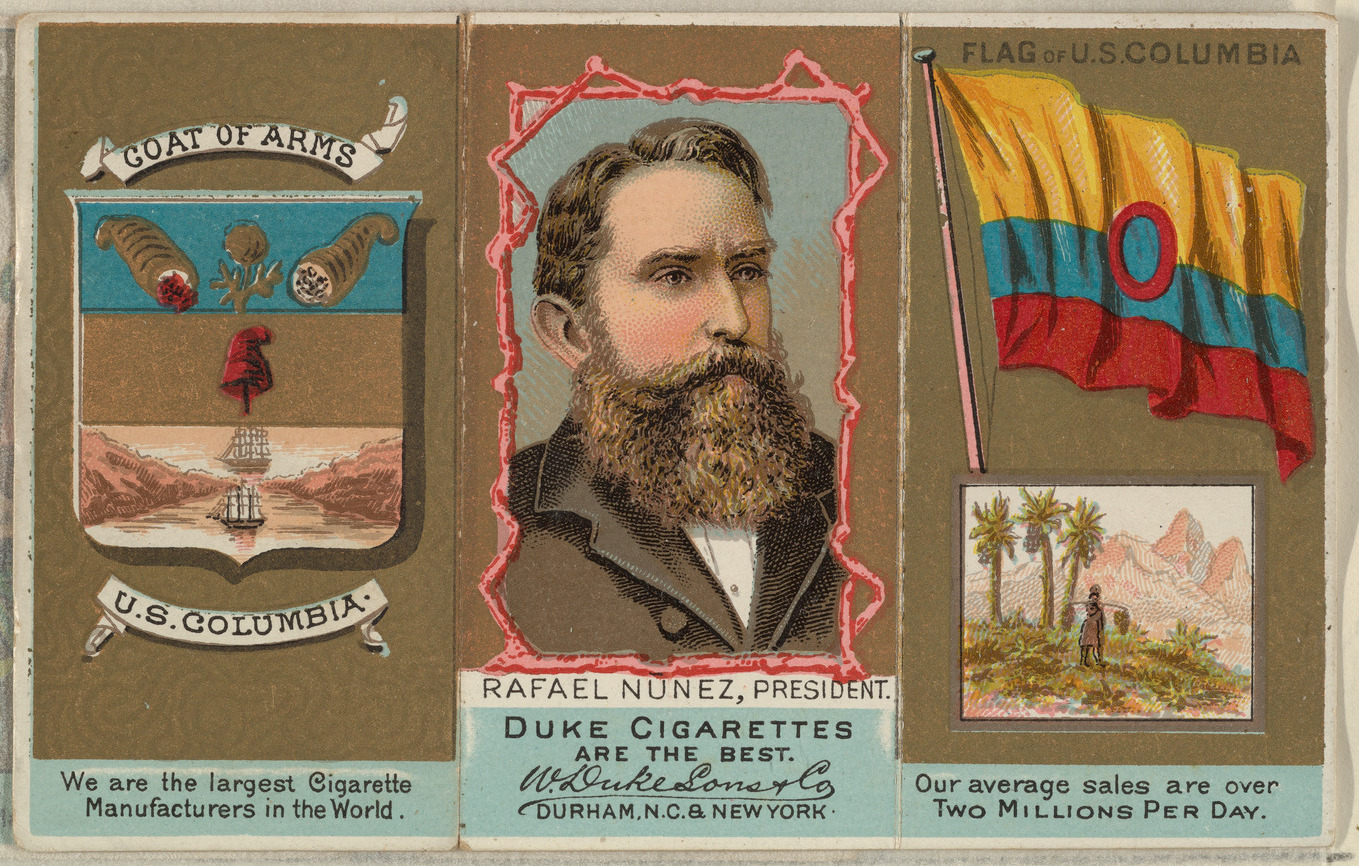
1888 commercial color lithograph of Núñez

In 1874, while in Europe, he had many of his most important writings published.

Núñez was the author of the words to the national anthem of Colombia, ¡Oh Gloria Inmarcesible!.

Núñez is mentioned in Gabriel García Márquez's 1985 novel, Love in the Time of Cholera (Amor en los tiempos del cólera).

Political offices
Preceded by Eugenio Baena	President of the Sovereign State of Bolívar; 1876-1877	Succeeded by Manuel González Carazo
Preceded by Benjamin Noguera	President of the Sovereign State of Bolívar; 1879-1880	Succeeded by Benjamin Noguera
Preceded by Julián Trujillo Largacha	President of the United States of Colombia; 1880–1882	Succeeded by Francisco Javier Zaldúa
Preceded by José Eusebio Otalora	President of the United States of Colombia; 1884–1886	Office abolished
New office	President of Colombia; 1887-1888	Succeeded by Carlos Holguín Mallarino
Preceded by Carlos Holguín Mallarino	President of Colombia; 1892-1894	Succeeded by Miguel Antonio Caro
