= Julián Trujillo Largacha =

Colombian lawyer and statesman

Julián Trujillo
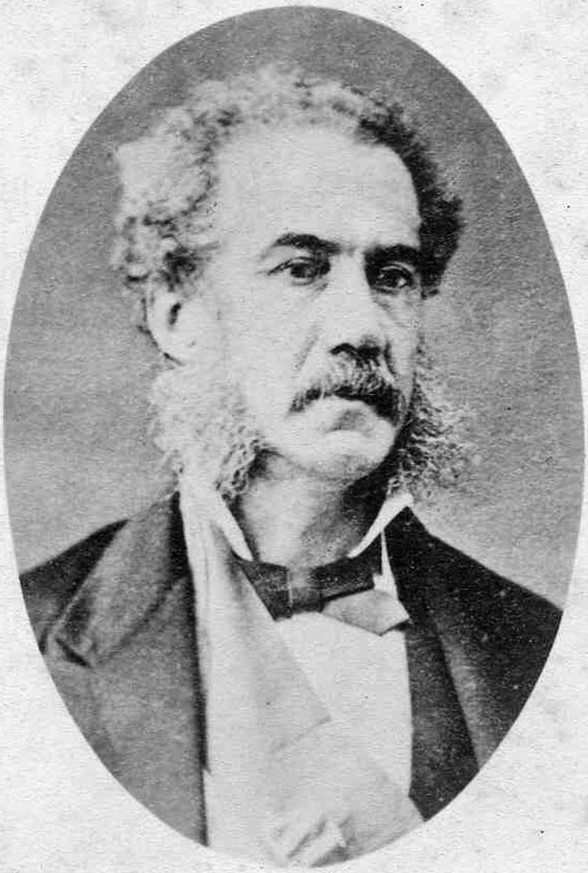

12th President of the United States of Colombia
- In office April 1, 1878 – April 8, 1880
- Preceded by: Aquileo Parra
- Succeeded by: Rafael Núñez

13th President of the Sovereign State of Antioquia
- In office April 10, 1877 – December 19, 1877
- Preceded by: Manuel María Uribe Ángel
- Succeeded by: Daniel Aldana Manta

6th President of the Sovereign State of Cauca
- In office August 1, 1873 – August 1, 1875
- Preceded by: Tomás Cipriano de Mosquera
- Succeeded by: César Conto

3rd Envoy Extraordinary and Minister Plenipotentiary of Colombia to Ecuador
- In office 1870–1872
- President: Eustorgio Salgar Moreno
- Preceded by: Lino Ruiz
- Succeeded by: Antonio González Carazo

3rd President of the Sovereign State of Cauca
- In office August 15, 1867 – August 15, 1869
- Preceded by: Eliseo Payán
- Succeeded by: Andrés Cerón Serrano

Personal details
- Born: January 28, 1828 Popayán, Cauca, Colombia
- Died: July 18, 1883 (aged 55) Bogotá, Cundinamarca, Colombia
- Party: Liberal
- Spouse: Dolores Carvajal Espinosa
- Occupation: Lawyer, soldier, politician

Military service
- Allegiance: Colombia (Liberal Party)
- Branch/service: National Army of Colombia
- Rank: General
- Commands: Army Chief of Staff
- Battles/wars: Colombian Civil War (1860–1862); Colombian Civil War of 1876

Julián Trujillo Largacha (January 28, 1828 – July 18, 1883) was a Colombian lawyer, statesman, General of the Army and President of Colombia from 1878 to 1880.

== Early life ==
Trujillo was born in Popayán, Cauca, on January 28, 1828.

Trujillo studied jurisprudence and graduated as a lawyer in 1849.

== Private life ==
Trujillo married Doña Dolores Thorny Carvajal, with whom he had 7 children.

== Military career ==
In 1875, Trujillo enlisted in the army to defend the government of President Aquileo Parra against the conservative revolt. He participated in the Battle of Los Chancos, where the national army defeated the Conservative rebels. He was ascended to the rank of General. Later, Trujillo led the government’s forces in the successful seizure of Manizales, mayor stronghold of the Conservative army. He was promoted to the rank of "Great General".

== Political career ==
After Trujillo's military victory in the seizure of Manizales, and the granting of amnesty to the conservative opponents, he was appointed as Military and Civilian Chief of the city of Manizales. In 1877, he was designated as President of the State of Antioquia, to replace the defeated and deposed Silverio Arango.

== Presidency ==
In March 1877, Trujillo was nominated as candidate for the liberal party by General Tomás Cipriano de Mosquera and Manuel Murillo Toro, one month before his arrival to the city of Medellín. This nomination was to honor the desires of General Rafael Núñez, who had expressed his wishes in a letter to General Fernando Ponce, dated October 28, 1876, in which he stated that General Trujillo was the most qualified to be President of Colombia. Both wings of the liberal party, radicals and independents, united in support for the candidacy of Trujillo. He was elected president without opposition from the conservative party, who had been defeated in the war and decided not to take part in this presidential election. He died in Bogotá, Cundinamarca, on July 18, 1883.
