= List of people on the postage stamps of Colombia =

This article lists people who have been featured on the postage stamps of Colombia and its states. Note that many of these people have been featured on multiple stamps. The following entries list the name of the person, a short description of their notability, and the year they were first featured on a stamp.

The states of Cundinamarca, Santander, and Tolima have not honored any people on their stamps. The states of Antioquia, Bolivar, Boyaca have honored people on their stamps.

== A ==
- Miguel Abadía Méndez, president of Colombia, 1926-30 (1981)
- Mercedes Abrego, spy and martyr (2010)
- Josefa Acevedo de Gómez, writer (1997)
- Soledad Acosta de Samper, writer and journalist (2013)
- Alexander II of Russia, czar of Russia (2019)
- Rafael Almanza, Cuban intellectual and writer (1958)
- Jorge Alvarez Lleras, engineer and director of the National Astronomical Observatory (1988)
- es:Gilberto Alzate Avendaño, journalist and popular leader (1971)
- Simona Amaya, heroine of the revolution (2011)
- Matilde Anaray, heroine of the revolution (2011)
- Manuel Ancízar, lawyer, writer, and journalist (1953)
- Andrés Rosillo y Meruelo, bishop and rebel (2009)
- Diego Euclídes de Angulo Lemos, president of Colombia, 1908 (2010)
- José Antonio Anzoátegui, Venezuelan brigadier general (1969)
- Thomas Aquinas, philosopher, theologian, jurist and saint (1982)
- Gonzalo Arango, Colombian poet, journalist and philosopher (2010)
- Juan de Dios Aranzazu González, president of New Granada, 1841-42 (1982)
- Consuelo Araújo Noguera, Colombian politician, writer and journalist (2002)
- Julio Arboleda, writer, soldier and statesman (1966)
- Ismael Enrique Arciniegas, poet (2016)
- Julio Garavito Armero, Colombian astronomer and mathematician (1949)
- Diójenes Arrieta, politician (1997)
- Andrés A. Arroyo, founder of the Colombian Society of Engineers (1962)
- José Gervasio Artigas, national hero of Uruguay (1955)
- Aurelio Arturo, poet (1997)
- Atahualpa, last sovereign emperor of the Inca Empire (1955)
- Saint Augustine, Christian theologian and philosopher (1987)
- Rafael Azuero Manchóla, vice-president of Colombia (2010)

== B ==
- Johann Sebastian Bach, German composer and musician (1986)
- Lord Robert Baden-Powell, founder of the Scouting movement (2007)
- Vasco Núñez de Balboa, conquistador (1955)
- Antonio Baraya, military leader (1950)
- Porfirio Barba-Jacob, poet and writer (1983)
- Virgilio Barco Maldonado, pioneer of the petroleum industry (1996)
- Virgilio Barco, president of Colombia, 1986-90 (1997)
- Enrique A. Becerra, jurist (2010)
- Ludwig van Beethoven, German composer (1977)
- Sebastián de Belalcázar, conquistador (1955)
- Andrés Bello, Venezuelan humanist, diplomat, poet, legislator, and educator (1946)
- Manuela Beltran Archila, heroine of independence (2011)
- Luis Eduardo Bermúdez Acosta, composer (2012)
- Cayetano Betancur, Colombian philosopher, writer and linguist (2012)
- Domingo Bioho, black leader (1997)
- Simón Bolívar, liberator (1886)
- John Bosco, saint (1990)
- Francisco Burgos Rubio, general (1996)

== C ==
- Prisciliano Cabrales Lora, pioneer in petroleum industry (1996)
- Francisco José de Caldas, lawyer, naturalist, and geographer (1910)
- Abdon Calderon, hero of the war of independence of Ecuador (1955)
- Clímaco Calderón Reyes, lawyer, diplomat and president of Colombia, 1882 (2010)
- Bartolomé Calvo, president of the Granadine Confederation, 1861 (1981)
- Luis Antonio Calvo, composer (1984)
- José Justo Joaquín Camacho Lago, statesman, lawyer, journalist and professor (2010)
- Salvador Camacho Roldan, lawyer, businessman, politician and president (1995)
- Sergio Camargo, president of Colombia, 1877 (1981)
- José María Campo Serrano, president of Colombia, 1886-87 (1981)
- Manuela Cañizares y Álvarez, Ecuador heroine of independence (2011)
- Alfonso Cano Isaza, editor of El Espectador (1987)
- Fidel Cano Gutierrez, journalist, founder of El Espectador (1977)
- Guillermo Cano Isaza, Colombian journalist (1993)
- Luis Cano Villegas, editor of El Espectador (1987)
- Luis Gabriel Cano Isaza, editor of El Espectador (1987)
- Maria Cano Márquez, popular leader (1997)
- José María Carbonel, revolutionary agitator (2009)
- José Eusebio Caro, poet (1955)
- Miguel Antonio Caro, scholar, poet, journalist, politician, and president 1894-98 (1947)
- Eduardo Carranza, poet (1986)
- Maria Mercedes Carranza, poet (2010)
- Juan de Dios Carrasquilla, doctor and botanist (1949)
- Rafael Maria Carrasquilla, religious, educator and writer (1959)
- Tomás Carrasquilla Naranjo, Colombian writer (1993)
- Jose Joaquin Casas, educator and diplomat (1967)
- Alberto Castilla, founder of the Tolima Conservatory of Music (1964)
- José María del Castillo y Rada, president of the United Provinces of the New Granada. 1814-15 (1995)
- José Vicente Castro Silva, rector of the Mayor del Rosario School (1986)
- Domingo Caycedo, president of Colombia, 1839-43 (1982)
- Joaquín de Caycedo y Cuero, military and political patriot (1946)
- Andrés Cerón Serrano, lawyer and politician (2010)
- Miguel de Cervantes, author of Don Quixote (2005)
- Charlie Chaplin, movie actor and director (1995)
- Frederic Chopin, composer (2006)
- Winston Churchill, prime minister of Great Britain (1945)
- Francisco Javier Cisneros, railway engineer (1949)
- St. Peter Claver, Spanish Jesuit priest and missionary (1981)
- Agustín Codazzi, lawyer, writer, and journalist (1953)
- Christopher Columbus, discoverer of New World (1932)
- Francisca Josefa de la Concepción, nun, mystic, writer and saint (1972)
- José Vicente Concha, president of Colombia, 1914-18 (1981)
- Jackie Coogan, movie actor (1995)
- Nicholas Copernicus, Polish astronomer (1974)
- José María Córdoba, general of the Colombian army (1917)
- Marcos Crespo, Ecuadorian politician and independence hero (1957)
- Manuelita de la Cruz, Colombian nurse (1961)
- Rufino Jose Cuervo, writer, linguist and philologist (1917)
- Teresa Cuervo Borda, art historian (1990)
- María Currea Manrique, women's rights activist (1988)

== D ==
- Brother Damian, priest (1961)
- Jean-Baptiste de La Salle, founder of the Institute of the Brothers of the Christian Schools (1986)
- José Matías Delgado, Salvadoran priest, doctor and liberator (1957)
- Juan de Dios Morales, governmental minister and revolutionary (2009)
- Luis Duque Gómez, archaeologist (2010)
- Simona Duque de Alzate, heroine of the revolution (2011)
- Jean Henri Dunant, founder of the Red Cross (1956)
- Gilberto Alejandro Durán Diaz, composer and accordion player (2019)

== E ==
- Darío Echandía Olaya, president of Colombia, 1943-44 (1991)
- Guillermo Echavarría Misas, aviation pioneer (1997)
- Gloria Echeverri Lara, director of Community Action and Indigenous Affairs (1992)
- Elizabeth of Hungary, princess and saint (1956)
- Rafael Escalona, composer (2016)
- Hugo Escobar Sierra, jurist and politician (2010)
- José María Espinosa, painter (1983)
- Josemaría Escrivá, founder of Opus Dei (1994)

== F ==
- Diego Fallon, educator, musician and poet (1984)
- José Rafael Faría Bermúdez, priest (2000)
- Ferdinand, king of Spain and sponsor of Christopher Columbus (1955)
- Pedro Fermín de Vargas, economist (1997)
- José Fernández Madrid, statesman, physician, scientist, writer and president, 1814, 1816 (1995)
- Juan Fernández de Sotomayor, bishop (2009)
- Julio Flórez, poet (2017)
- Deogracias Fonseca, president of Colombia, 1957-58 (2010)
- Francis of Assisi, saint (1982)
- Pope Francis, head of the Roman Catholic Church (2017)
- Juan Friede Alter, historian (1997)

== G ==
- Jorge Eliécer Gaitán, lawyer and politician (1959)
- Cacique Gaitana, Indian resistance leader (1997)
- Luis Carlos Galán Sarmiento, political reformer (1991)
- José Antonio Galán, farmer and revolution leader (1940)
- Custodio García Rovira, general, statesman, painter, and president of New Grenada, 1816 (1995)
- Gabriel García Márquez, writer and Nobel Prize winner (1982)
- Federico García Lorca, Spanish poet, playwright, and theatre director (1986)
- Juan García del Río, Colombian diplomat, writer, politician and president of Gran Colombia (1995)
- Carlos Gardel, entertainer (1985)
- Carlos Gaviria Diaz, politician (2018)
- Pantaleón Germán Ribón, military and independence leader (2012)
- Atanasio Girardot, Colombian revolutionary leader (1991)
- Álvaro Gómez Hurtado, Colombian lawyer, politician, and journalist (1997)
- Fernando Gomez Martinez, diplomat, politician and Colombian journalist (1986)
- Laureano Gómez, president of Colombia, 1950-53 (1972)
- Pedro Nel Gómez, Colombian engineer, painter, and sculptor (1985)
- José Maria González Benito, mathematician, astronomer (1997)
- Ramón González Valencia, president of Colombia, 1909-10 (1981)
- León de Greiff, poet (1996)
- Manuel de Guirior, Spanish naval officer and viceroy of New Granada (1977)
- Ignacio Gutiérrez Vergara, politician, statesman and journalist (2010)
- Santos Gutiérrez, president of Colombia, 1868-70 (1981)
- Virginia Gutiérrez, social anthropologist (2010)

== H ==
- Pedro de Heredia, Spanish conqueror (1934)
- Bertha Hernandez de Ospina, Colombian politician and writer and wife of Mariano Ospina Pérez (1999)
- Benjamín Herrera, Colombian politician and general (2010)
- Tomás de Herrera, statesman, general and president of the Free State of the Isthmus (1995)
- Pedro Alcántara Herrán, Colombian general, statesman and president, 1841-45 (1957)
- Miguel Hidalgo y Costilla, leader of the Mexican War of Independence (1955)
- Sir Rowland Hill, postal reformer and inventor of the postage stamp (1979)
- Carlos Holguín Mallarino, president of Colombia, 1888-92 (1981)
- Jorge Holguín, president of Colombia, 1921-22 (1981)
- Alexander von Humboldt, naturalist (1960)
- Ezequiel Hurtado, general, statesman and president of Colombia, 1882 (1995)

== I ==
- St. Ignatius of Loyola, founder of Jesuits (1956)
- Isidore the Laborer, Spanish farmworker and patron saint of rural people (1960)
- Isabella I, queen of Spain (1953)
- Jorge Isaacs, Colombian writer, politician and soldier (1987)

== J ==
- Esteban Jaramillo, economist (1997)
- Maria de Jesus Paramo de Collazos, founded first normal school for women (1975)
- Gonzalo Jiménez de Quesada, Spanish explorer and conquistador (1979)
- Pope John XXIII, pope and saint (1963)
- Pope John Paul II, pope (2006)
- Benito Juárez, revolutionary leader and president of Mexico (1972)

== K ==
- John F. Kennedy, president of the United States (1963)

== L ==
- Alicia Lafaurie Roncallo, first Carnival Queen (2018)
- Rodrigo Lara Bonilla, Colombian lawyer and politician (1992)
- Froilan Largacha, lawyer, politician and president of Colombia, 1863 (1995)
- Eduardo Lemaitre Román, historian (1997)
- Carlos Lemos Simmonds, vice-president of Colombia (2010)
- Manuel Ponce de León, cartographer and civil engineer (1953)
- José Ramón de Leyva, military commander (2009)
- Indalecio Liévano Aguirre, politician and diplomat (1992)
- Abraham Lincoln, president of the United States (1960)
- Alberto Lleras Camargo, president of Colombia, 1945-46, 1958-62 (1995)
- Carlos Lleras Restrepo, president of Colombia, 1966-70 (1995)
- Federico Lleras Acosta, Colombian doctor, veterinarian and bacteriologist (1977)
- José María Lombana Barreneche, physician and politician (1952)
- María Concepción Loperena, independence war heroine (1985)
- Alfonso López Michelsen, president of Colombia, 1974-78 (2008)
- Alfonso López Pumarejo, president of Colombia, 1934-38, 1942-46 (1961)
- Estela López Pomareda, movie actress (1995)
- José Hilario López, president of Colombia, 1849-53 (1981)
- Luis Carlos López, poet (1997)
- Luis Eduardo Lopez de Mesa, doctor, writer and Education Minister (1984)
- Maria Lopez de Escobar, founder and director of the world's first international adoption agency (1992)
- Saint Louise de Marillac, nun, saint and founder of the Sisters of Charity (1960)
- Enrique Low Murtra, Colombian economist, lawyer and Minister of Justice (1992)
- Carlos Lozano y Lozano, president of Colombia, 1942 (1982)
- Fabio Lozano Torrijos, diplomat (1997)
- Jorge Tadeo Lozano, scientist, journalist, and politician (1967)

== M ==
- José de la Mar, Peruvian military leader, politician and the third President of Peru (1955)
- Manuel María Mallarino, acting president of Colombia, 1855-57 (1981)
- Roberto de Mares, pioneer of the petroleum industry (1996)
- Guglielmo Marconi, radio pioneer (1975)
- José Ignacio de Márquez, president of Colombia, 1837-41 (1982)
- José Manuel Marroquín, political figure and president of Colombia, 1900-04 (1904)
- José Martí, Cuban patriot (1955)
- William Knox Martin, early aviation pioneer (1994)
- Aurelio Martinez Mutis, poet and writer (1987)
- Diego Martinez Camargo, pioneer in the petroleum industry (1996)
- Pompilio Martínez Navarrete, doctor and professor (1952)
- Rafael Maya, poet, journalist, writer, critic, lawyer and diplomat (1986)
- Adolfo Mejia, composer (2010)
- Gonzalo Mejia, aviation pioneer, motion picture pioneer, and industrialist (1985)
- Liborio Mejía, Colombian colonel, politician and president, 1816 (1995)
- Manuel Mejía Jaramillo, banker and Colombian coffee leader (1965)
- Manuel Mejía Vallejo, writer (2015)
- José María Melo, Colombian general, politician and president of New Granada, 1854 (1995)
- Vanessa Alexandra Mendoza Bustos, actress, fashion model and Miss Venezuela (2002)
- Santo Michelena, Venezuelan politician (1957)
- Fanny Mikey, Colombian actress, theatre producer and entrepreneur (2014)
- Gerardo Molina Ramirez, lawyer, professor and politician (2010)
- Montezuma, ninth Aztec emperor (1955)
- Laura Montoya, nun and saint (1974)
- Antonio Morales Galavís, military commander (2009)
- Francisco Antonio Moreno, education reformer and judge (1977)
- Joaquín Mosquera, president of Colombia, 1830 (1982)
- Manuel José Mosquera, Archbishop of Bogota (1954 )
- Victor Mosquera Chaux, lawyer, politician and diplomat (2010)
- Tomás Cipriano de Mosquera, Colombian general, political figure and president 1845-49, 1861-64, 1866-67 (1978)
- Pedro Domingo Murillo, patriot of Upper Peru (1955)
- José Celestino Mutis, priest, botanist and mathematician (1947)

== N ==
- Antonio Nariño, political and military leader of the independence movement (1887)
- Rafael Navas Pardo, president of Colombia, 1957-1958 (2010)
- Agustín Nieto Caballero, educator (1989)
- Juan José Nieto Gil, Colombian politician, Army general, writer, and president, 1861 (2010)
- Rafael Núñez, journalist, politician, and president of Colombia, 1880-82, 1884-94 (1886)
- Soledad Román de Núñez, wife of president Rafael Núñez (1999)

== O ==
- José de Obaldía, acting president of Colombia (1982)
- José Maria Obando, president of Colombia, 1853-54 (1981)
- Candelario Obeso, poet, novelist, playwright, and professor (1984)
- Bernardo O'Higgins, Chilean independence leader (1955)
- Enrique Olaya Herrera, president of Colombia, 1930-34 (1981)
- Nicolás Mauricio de Omaña, priest and lawyer (2009)
- Luis Ernesto Ordóñez, military officer, politician and member of ruling junta (2010)
- Mariano Ospina Pérez, president of Colombia, 1946-50 (1981)
- Mariano Ospina Rodríguez, president of Colombia, 1857-61 (1981)
- Pedro Nel Ospina Vázquez, president of Colombia, 1922-26 (1981)
- Nicolás Osorio y Zayas, Spanish aristocrat (1952)

== P ==
- José Prudencio Padilla, Colombian military leader (1984)
- Alfonso Palacio Rudas, Colombian lawyer, economist and politician (2013)
- Jorge Palacios Preciado, historian and director-general of the National Archives (2012)
- Manuel Maria Palacio, pioneer of the petroleum industry (1996)
- Gabriel París Gordillo, president of Colombia, 1876-78 (2010)
- Aquileo Parra, Colombian soldier, businessman and political figure (1981)
- Misael Pastrana Borrero, president of Colombia, 1970-74 (1998)
- Pope Paul VI, pope (1968)
- Eliseo Payán, vice-president and president of Colombia, 1887 (1981)
- Javier Pereira, Zenú Indian and Colombian supercentenarian (1956)
- Alexandre Pétion, first President of the Republic of Haiti (1955)
- José Miguel Pey de Andrade, statesman, soldier and a leader of the independence movement (1996)
- Enrique Pérez Arbeláez, botanist (1997)
- Rubén Piedrahíta Arango, member of military junta of an interim presidency (1981)
- Próspero Pinzón Romero, jurist, statesman and military leader (1903)
- Teresa Pizarro de Angulo, Colombian beauty pageant director and farmer (2010)
- Lino de Pombo, engineer, diplomat (1997)
- Rafael Pombo, poet and writer of children's literature (2012)
- Marie Poussepin, Dominican nun (1994)
- Alberto Pumarejo, Colombian lawyer and liberal politician (1993)

== Q ==
- Gonzalo Jiménez de Quesada, explorer and founder of Bogotá (1938)
- Joaquin Quijano Mantilla, journalist (1989)
- Manuel Quintín Lame, native leader (1997)

== R ==
- Gustavo Uribe Ramírez, ecologist (1980)
- Augusto Ramirez Ocampo, politician (2014)
- Abelardo Ramos, founder of the Colombian Society of Engineers (1962)
- Gerardo Reichel-Dolmatoff, archaeologist (1997)
- Ricardo Rendón Bravo, Colombian caricaturist (1994)
- Carlos Eugenio Restrepo, president of Colombia, 1910-14 (1981)
- Félix Restrepo Mejía, Jesuit priest, theologian and scholar (1967)
- Jose Felix de Restrepo, educator, judge and Colombian lawyer (2009)
- José Manuel Restrepo, investigator of Colombian flora, political figure and historian (1981)
- Rafael Reyes, army chief of staff and president of Colombia, 1904-09 (1957)
- Antonio Ricaurte y Lozano, patriot and military captain (1917)
- Ramón Arturo Rincon Quiñónes, Colombian general (2003)
- Baron de Rio Branco, Brazilian diplomat, geographer, historian, monarchist, politician and professor (1955)
- José Manuel Rivas Sacconi, diplomat (1997)
- José Eustasio Rivera, writer (1974)
- Emilio Robledo, medical educator (2010)
- Luis Antonio Robles Suárez, Colombian lawyer and politician (1999)
- Juan Rodríguez Freyle, colonial reporter (1997)
- Manuel Rodríguez Torices, statesman, lawyer, journalist, and vice-president (2010)
- Meliton Rodriguez, photographer (1993)
- Gustavo Rojas Pinilla, president of Colombia, 1953-57 (1995)
- José María Rojas Garrido, president of Colombia, 1886 (1981)
- Eleanor Roosevelt, women's and civil rights activist and wife of Franklin Delano Roosevelt (1964)
- Franklin Delano Roosevelt, president of the United States (1945)
- García Rovira, general, statesman and painter (1940)
- Mother Juana Ruperta, unknown (1970)

== S ==
- Policarpa Salvarrieta, executed spy for revolutionary forces (2017)
- Miguel Samper, economist and writer (1976)
- Santiago Samper Brush, founder of the Colombian Red Cross (1956)
- José Francisco de San Martín, Argentine general and independence leader (1955)
- Diodoro Sánchez, founder of the Colombian Society of Engineers (1962)
- Manuela Sanz de Santamaria, heroine of South American independence (2011)
- Manuela Sáenz de Thorne, heroine of South American independence (2011)
- Policarpa Salavarrieta, heroine of the independence of Colombia (1910)
- Francisco de Paula Santander, military and political leader, president of New Granada 1832-37 (1910)
- Antonia Santos, rebel leader and heroine (2011)
- Eduardo Santos, president of Colombia, 1938-42 (1981)
- Enrique Santos Castillo, lawyer and journalist (2017)
- Enrique Santos Montejo, Colombian journalist (1986)
- Juan Manuel Santos Calderón, president of Colombia, 2010-18 (2018)
- Giuliana Scalaberni, wife of Pedro Nel Gómez (1985)
- Vera Sergine Renoir, French actress (2001)
- Carlos Martínez Silva, politician, diplomat, journalist, soldier and poet (1948)
- José Asunción Silva, poet (1986)
- Oreste Sindici, composer of the national anthem (1988)
- José Francisco Socarrás Colina, physician and educator (2016)
- Manuel del Socorro Rodríguez, Cuban journalist (1947)
- Francisco Solano López, president of Paraguay (1955)
- Joseph Stalin, General Secretary of the Communist Party of the Soviet Union (1945)
- Marco Fidel Suárez, president of Colombia, 1918-21 (1981)
- Antonio José de Sucre, Venezuelan independence leader (1887)

== T ==
- Teresa of Ávila, nun, mystic, writer and saint (1970)
- Tisquesusa, fourth supreme ruler of Bacatá (1955)
- Murillo Toro, politician and statesman (1944)
- Camilo Torres Tenorio, Colombian politician and founder (1910)
- Manuel Murillo Toro, president of Colombia, 1864-66, 1872-74 (1944)
- Cristóbal de Torres, priest, theologian and professor (1954)
- Diego de Torres y Moyachoque, Turmequé Indian chief (2012)
- José Jerónimo Triana, botanist (1947)
- Miguel Triana, Colombian engineer and historian (1962)
- Julio César Turbay Ayala, president of Colombia, 1978-82 (2009)
- Diana Turbay Quintero, Colombian journalist (1992)
- Gabriel Turbay Abunader, politician, diplomat (1997)

== U ==
- Alberto Urdaneta y Urdaneta, painter, designer and publisher (1947)
- Rafael Urdaneta, Venezuelan general and president of Gran Colombia, 1830-31 (1995)
- Roberto Urdaneta Arbeláez, president of Colombia, 1951-53 (1982)
- Pedro Uribe Mejia, pioneer of Colombian coffee industry (1987)
- César Uribe Piedrahita, medical writer, physician and educator (2010)
- Rafael Uribe Uribe, Colombian lawyer, journalist, and general (2009)
- Ezequiel Uricoechea, linguist and scientist (1952)

== V ==
- Gloria Valencia de Castaño, Colombian journalist and television presenter (2013)
- Guillermo Valencia, newspaper founder, governor and author (1951)
- Guillermo León Valencia, president of Colombia, 1962-66 (2009)
- Paulina Vega Dieppa, Miss Universe 2014 (2015)
- Juana Velasco de Gallo, heroine of the revolution (2011)
- Antonio Villavicencio, statesman, soldier and president of New Granada, 1815 (1995)
- Lorencita Villegas de Santos, First Lady and philanthropist (1993)
- José María Villa, mechanical engineer and mathematician (1981)
- Vincent de Paul, priest and saint (1957)

== W ==
- George Washington, president of the United States (1955)

== X ==
- St. Francis Xavier, missionary and saint (2006)

== Z ==
- Francisco Antonio Zea, journalist, botanist, diplomat and statesman (1967)
- Ramón de Zubiría, writer, educator (1997)
- Eduardo Zuleta Angel, politician (1999)
- Luz Marina Zuluaga, Miss Universe pageant winner (1959)

== Antioquia ==
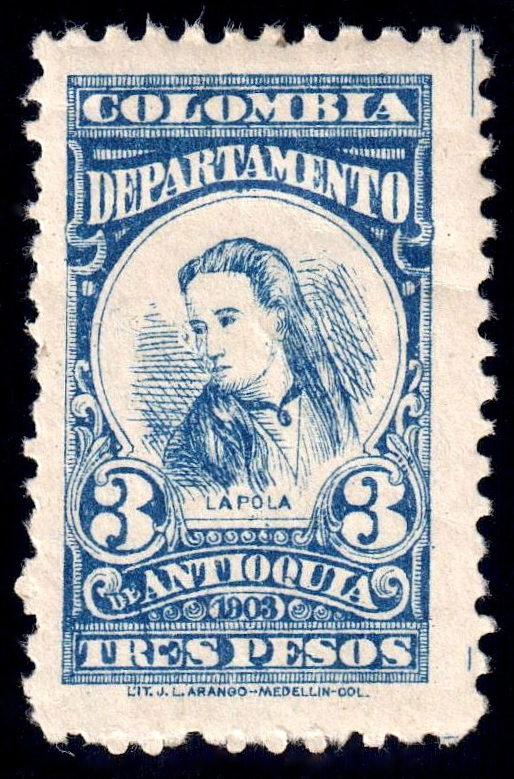
Policarpa Salavarrieta

- Pedro Justo Berrio, lawyer, soldier and politician (1875)
- Jose Maria Cordoba, general of the Colombian army (1899)
- Juan del Corral (1903)
- Anastasio Girardot (1902)
- José Fernández Madrid, statesman, physician, scientist, and writer (1903)
- Jose Felix Restrepo (1902)
- José María Restrepo (1903)
- Custodio Garcia Rovira, general, statesman and painter (1903)
- Policarpa Salavarrieta (La Pola), spy for the Revolutionary Forces (1903)
- Francisco Antonio Zea, journalist, botanist, diplomat and politician (1903)

== Bolivar ==
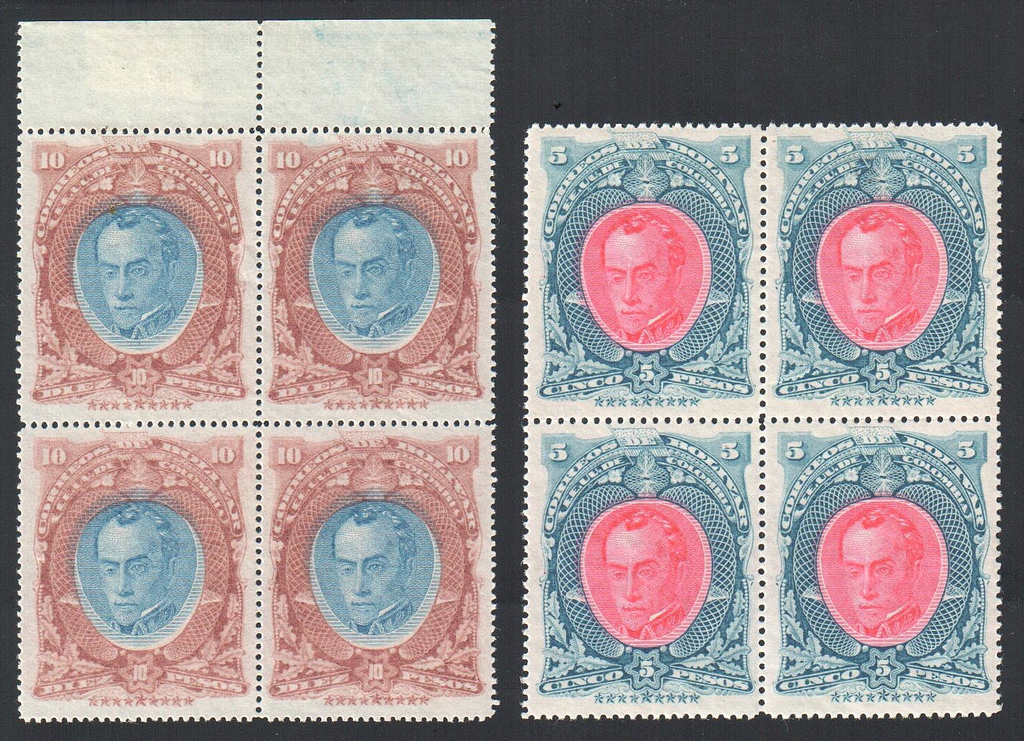
Simón Bolívar

- Manuel Anguiano (1904)
- Simón Bolívar, liberator (1879, 1882, 1891, 1903)
- José María del Castillo y Rada, president of the United Provinces of New Grenada, 1814-15 (1904)
- José María García de Toledo, lawyer and politician (1903)
- José Fernández Madrid, statesman, physician, scientist, and writer (1903)
- Manuel Rodríguez Torices, statesman, lawyer and journalist (1903)

== Boyaca ==
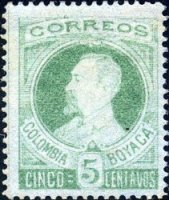
Diego Mendoza Pérez

- Jose Manuel Marroquin, president of Colombia, 1900-04 (1903)
- Diego Mendoza Perez, Minister of Finance and Public Credit of Colombia (1902)
- Dr. es:Próspero Pinzón Romero, general and Governor of Boyaca (1903)

== Sources ==
- 2021 Scott Standard Postage Stamp Catalogue, Vol. 2A, ©2021, Amos Media Co., Sidney, OH
- Stanley Gibbons Stamp Catalogue, Part 20, South America, 4th Edition, ©2008, Stanley Gibbons, London, UK
- Michel Übersee-Katalog Band 3: Südamerika 2001, ©2000, Schwaneberger GMBH, Munich, Germany
