= Pedro de Aguado =

Historical friar in Spain

Friar Pedro de Aguado (1513 or 1538 – late 16th or early 17th century) was a Spanish Franciscan friar who spent around 15 years in the New Kingdom of Granada, preaching to the indigenous people. During this time he published a work written by Fray Antonio de Medrano on the history of the region and Medrano's manuscript, Recopilación historial, which was almost ready for publication, between 1576 and 1583 but was unable to publish. The manuscript was used by other historians, but was not published until the twentieth century.

== Biography ==
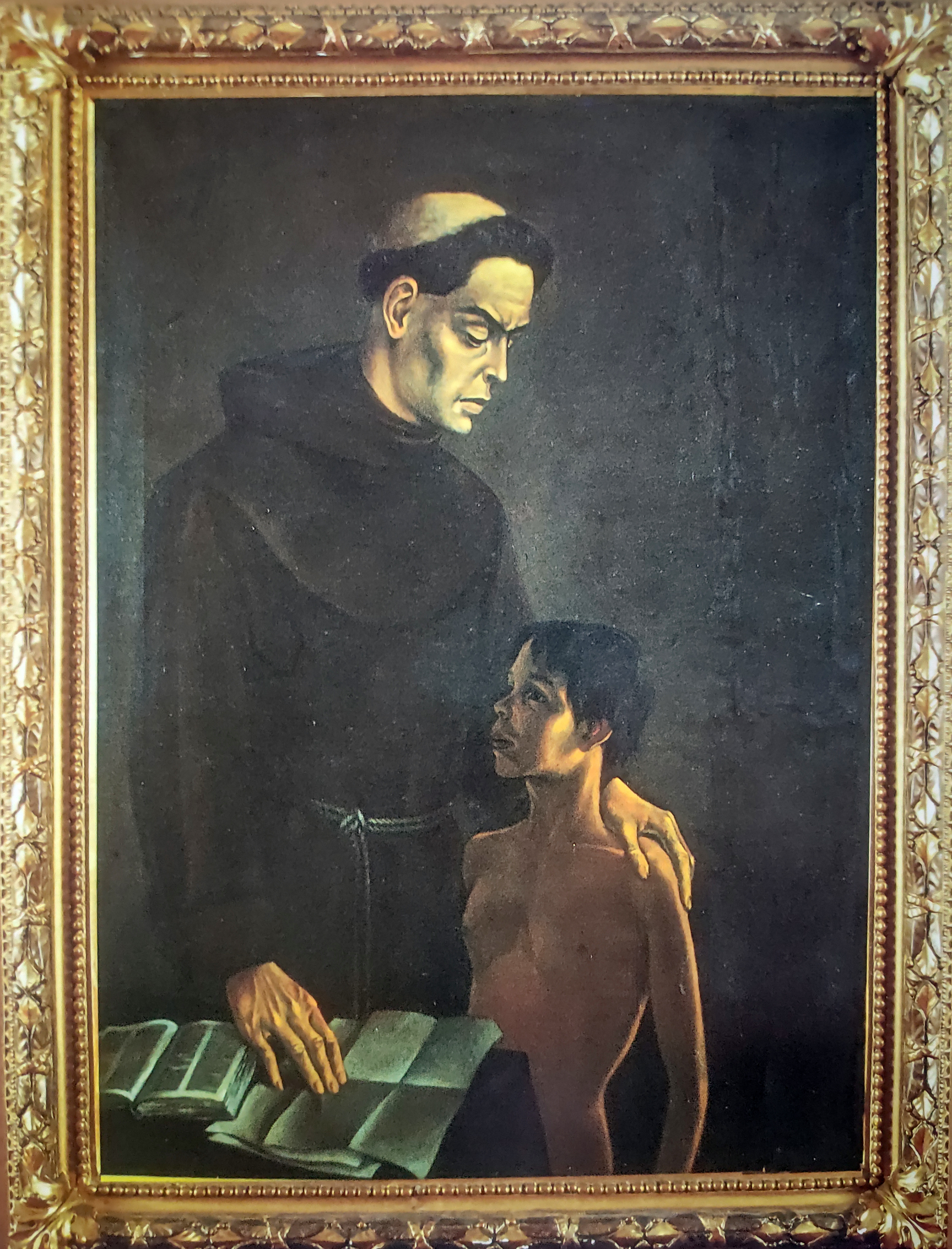
Friar Pedro Aguado

De Aguado's date of birth is uncertain. He is believed by Juan Friede to have been baptised in Valdemoro on 26 January 1513, whilst Guillermo Morón argues for 16 February 1538.

Arriving in the New World in 1560 or 1561 in Cartagena, his movements are uncertain until his arrival in Bogotá in 1571, although it is likely he soon left Cartagena to minister to the Muisca. By around 1564 he was a pastor to the Muisca at Cogua, and he was able to build two churches there. Cogua was considered the first Indigenous town in New Granada where all the Indigenous were converted to Christianity, an achievement of Aguado's recognised by King Philip II.

=== Recopilación historial ===
In 1571, De Aguado moved to Santafé de Bogotá, and became a "minister provincial" of the local Franciscan Province. In 1575, De Aguado was sent by the Province on a mission to Spain to answer charges that the local monks were greedy and abusive. He was not able to leave Spain to return to Bogotá until 1583. Fray Pedro de Aguado is known for having worked on a book called Recopilación historial. Fray Pedro Aguado states in the prologue to the reader that he wrote his work during moments of leisure and, in part, "because a friar of my Order named Fray Antonio de Medrano had begun this work, which remained unfinished due to his death. . . " Based on a questionable interpretation of this sentence, it was generally argued that Medrano only collected data or notes for the history of the New Kingdom of Granada, and that the merit of the "Recopilación Historial" belonged entirely to Aguado. Such an interpretation is arbitrary. If it were truly a simple compilation of scattered notes or data, or only the "beginning" of a book, there would be no mention of the possibility of publication. The quoted phrase indicates that the work left by Medrano was in an advanced state, almost ready for publication. This does not exclude the possibility that Aguado made subsequent revisions, omitted or added some paragraphs, arranged the composition to his liking, and completed certain sections. However, Aguado's work was essentially about editing and formatting, as he himself feared that his personal contribution might not be adequately appreciated. Aguado mentions having a "significant part" in the work, even though he fears that the reader might not fully appreciate it. Equally significant is the end of the same sentence, where it says: "And what remained of it (the book) I endeavored to perfect after fulfilling the obligation I had to the duties and governance of my Province." Aguado clearly indicates here that once he had made a "composition" using the papers left by Medrano, there were other papers and notes that Aguado had to perfect.

The only possible interpretation is that Medrano's literary legacy consisted of books that were so elaborate that they could be combined, albeit "with effort," into a single ready-to-publish body. There were also other, less elaborate papers that Aguado had to "perfect." This interpretation aligns with what another Franciscan historian, Fray Pedro Simón, stated a few years later, in 1604, after arriving in Santafé, to the same province of La Purificación to which Medrano and Aguado belonged. He mentions that the latter "continued the history that Medrano wrote and perfected it in two good volumes that are handwritten." This quote is of great interest because Simón did not know, as he himself states, the first part of the "Recopilación," where Aguado, in the prologue, makes his statements about Medrano. Therefore, his assertion was based on the statements of other friars, whom he found in the convent, some of whom might have collected direct information, perhaps even from Aguado himself. Antonio de León Pinelo, in his Biblioteca published in 1629, also follows this idea. He lists Fray Antonio Medrano as the sole author of the "History of the New Kingdom of Granada" and says: "Fray Pedro Aguado, a Franciscan, continued the previous work written by Medrano, and he perfected it in two good volumes for which he obtained printing privileges from the Royal Council of the Indies."

The investigation of the documentary records left by Aguado fully confirms the intellectual paternity of Medrano over, if not the entire, at least a substantial portion of the "Recopilación Historial." It is a significant plagiarism, committed by Aguado in presenting the work as his own when judged by modern standards. However, Medrano and Aguado were members of the same religious community. The words in the dedication to the King, where it is stated, "I do not intend. . . to illuminate my name or enhance my fame..." are not mere rhetoric. From the text of the request to the Council of the Indies, to which Aguado attached the index of his historical work, the "tabla," it is clear that he did not do it to gain personal distinctions or rewards or to boast as a historian. Instead, he did it solely to bolster his personal standing as a representative sent specifically to Spain to handle the affairs of his province at the Court. His sense of rectitude and commitment to the truth led him to include information about the historical labors of his predecessor, Fray Antonio de Medrano, in a proper manner. Medrano died early, during the expedition led by Licenciado Gonzalo Jiménez de Quesada in search of "El Dorado," the discovery of the New Kingdom of Granada. Aguado collected Medrano's manuscripts and composed his work in two volumes, seeking permission for publication. Such permission was granted, but the work was only published in the present century.

It is likely that he completed Part I of Medrano's Recopilación historial on Santa Marta and the New Kingdom of Granada in Bogotá, and Part II, on Venezuela and Cartagena, in Spain. De Aguado tried unsuccessfully to secure publication over a number of years. A series of bureaucratic hurdles around censorship were complicated by a change in the rules, invalidating the royal licence to print which de Aguado obtained in 1581, while a second licence in 1582 was complicated by a new requirement to have the printed copy checked against the original manuscript signed off by the king's secretary. Financial difficulties also played a role, but a definitive reason for publication failing to materialise is not known. A planned Part III appears to have been abandoned, possibly in frustration at the difficulties with publication, with the witness statements that would have been the source material left in Spain on his return to Bogotá in 1583.

=== Death ===
Dates for De Aguado's death are even less certain than those for his birth; dates vary from 1589 to 1595 to 1608. After his death, the Recopilación historial was used directly and indirectly by other authors, notably by Fray Pedro Simón, who appears to have had access to a copy of Part II of the manuscript which de Aguado took with him on his return to Bogotá. The manuscript De Aguado left in Spain was obtained in the late eighteenth century by the historian Juan Bautista Muñoz; his collection became part of the University of Valencia on his death, and was transferred to the Real Academia de la Historia after the university was partly destroyed in 1812 during a French siege of Valencia. There, the manuscript was discovered in 1845 by Joaquín Acosta, and it was consulted by some historians in the latter part of the nineteenth century. However, it was not published until 1906 (Part I, Historia de Santa Marta y Nuevo Reino de Granada) and 1913 (Part II, Historia de Venezuela).

== Works ==
- Historia de Santa Marta y Nuevo Reino de Granada (1906) (Part I, Part II – 1916/17 edition by Jerónimo Bécker)
- Historia de Venezuela (1913) (Part I, Part II – 1918/19 edition by Jerónimo Bécker)
