= Policarpa Salavarrieta =

Heroine of the Colombian War of Independence

Policarpa Salavarrieta Ríos
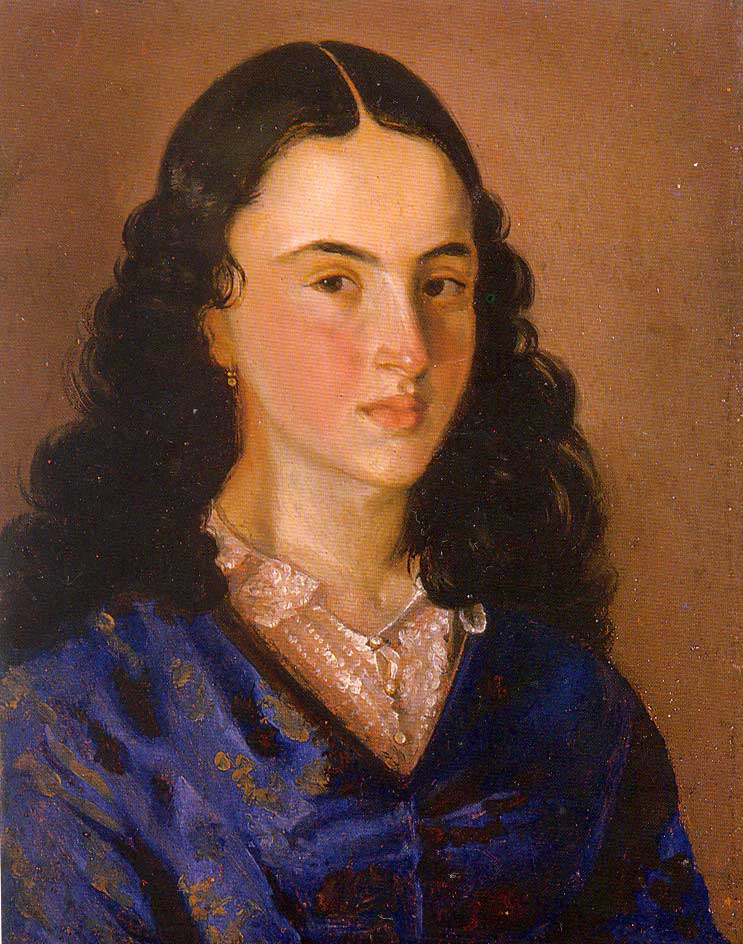
- Heroine of the Colombian Independence Movement
- Born: 26 January 1795; Guaduas, Viceroyalty of New Granada
- Died: 14 November 1817 (aged 22); Bogotá, Viceroyalty of New Granada
- Resting place: Church of San Agustín, La Candelaria, Bogotá, D.C., Colombia
- Occupations: Seamstress and spy
- Parent(s): Joaquín Salavarrieta; Mariana de Ríos

Policarpa Salavarrieta Ríos (c. 26 January 1795 – 14 November 1817), also known by her nickname of La Pola, was a Neogranadine seamstress who spied for the Revolutionary Forces during the Spanish Reconquista of the Viceroyalty of New Granada. She was captured by Spanish Royalists and ultimately executed for high treason. The Day of the Colombian Woman is commemorated on the anniversary of her death. She is now considered a heroine of the independence of Colombia.

== Name ==
Because her birth certificate was never found, her legal given name is unknown. The name Salavarrieta is known only by the names her family and friends used. Her father referred to her as Apolonia in his will, which Salvador Contreras, the priest who formalized the testament on 13 December 1802, confirmed. She was closest to her brother, Bibiano, as she became his de facto guardian when her parents died. When the armed forces in Guaduas started looking for her, she began calling herself Policarpa.

In her 1817 forged passport, used to get in and out of Bogotá during the Reconquista, she appeared as "Gregoria Apolinaria." Andrea Ricaurte de Lozano, whom Policarpa lived with, and officially worked for in Bogotá, as well as Ambrosio Almeyda, a guerrilla leader to whom she supplied information, also called her by that name. Her contemporaries referred to her simply as "La Pola," but Policarpa Salavarrieta is the name by which she is remembered and commemorated.

== Place and date of birth ==
Policarpa's date and place of birth are also subject to conjecture in the absence of legal documents. The popular version is that she was born in the municipality of Guaduas, Cundinamarca, between 1790 and 1796. However Rafael Pombo affirmed that she had been born in Mariquita, while José Caicedo Rojas confirmed it as Bogotá.

Her date and place of birth can be surmised from information available about her siblings which were not lost.

Her siblings were:

- María Ignacia Clara, born in the San Miguel parish of Guaduas, 1789–1802
- José María de los Ángeles, baptised in Guaduas in 1790 – became an Augustinian friar
- Catarina, born in Guaduas, 1791
- Eduardo, born in Guaduas, 1792–1802
- Manuel, born in Guaduas in 1796 – also became an Augustinian friar
- Francisco Antonio, baptised in the Santa Bárbara parish, Bogotá, in 1798
- Ramón, confirmed in Bogotá in 1800
- Bibiano, baptised in Bogotá, 1801.

Judging by these family records and the fact that Policarpa was born between her two religious brothers, she would appear to have been born between 1791 and 1796. The records also seem to indicate that the Salavarrieta family lived in Guaduas and moved to Bogotá after Manuel was born in 1796.

In an attempt to reconcile the discrepancies the Colombian Academy of History gave its final ruling on September 10, 1991, in favour of Guaduas, Cundinamarca, as Policarpa's birthplace.

== Early years ==
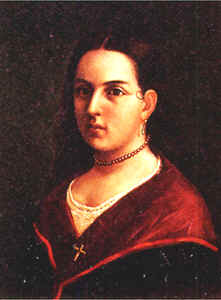
Watercolor by José María Espinosa

Without being titled or of the hidalgo class, Policarpa's family were apparently respectable and well-off, judging by her childhood home in Guaduas, now a museum. The Salavarrieta Ríos family moved to Bogotá between 1796 and 1798, living in a small house in the Santa Bárbara neighbourhood.

In 1802 a smallpox epidemic broke out in the capital, killing thousands, including Policarpa's father, mother, brother Eduardo and sister María Ignacia. After the tragedy, the family fell apart: José María and Manuel joining the Augustinian order, Ramón and Francisco Antonio traveled to Tena where they found work on a farm. Catarina, the oldest surviving child, decided to move back to Guaduas around 1804, taking her younger siblings Policarpa and Bibiano with her. They lived in the houses of their godmother Margarita Beltrán and their aunt Manuela until Catarina married Domingo García, again taking her two siblings with her.

There is little information about this period in Policarpa's life. What is known is that she worked as a seamstress, and is also believed to have worked as a teacher in a public school.

At that time Guaduas was an important rest stop on the most important road through New Granada, a stretch of land from Bogotá to the Magdalena River communicating with the north of the country and out to the Caribbean Sea: soldiers, nobles, artisans, farmers, insurgents, Spaniards and Grenadines of all walks of life passed through Guaduas, making it both a centre of commerce and of news and information. During the war, Policarpa's family were involved on the Revolutionary side: her brother-in-law, Domingo García, died fighting alongside Antonio Nariño in the Southern Campaign, in which her brother Bibiano also fought.

According to legend, after the Revolution broke out, the Viceroy Antonio José Amar y Borbón and his wife María Francisca Villanová, fearing for their lives, were smuggled out of Bogotá by the mayor José Miguel Pey de Andrade. They stopped in Guaduas, where the Vicereine, María Francisca Villanová, is supposed to have gone to Policarpa's house and foretold her imminent destiny and death.

== Revolutionary ==
History indicates that Policarpa was not involved in politics before 1810, but by the time she moved back to Bogotá in 1817, she was actively participating in political issues. Because Bogotá was the stronghold of the Reconquista, where most of the population were Spanish Royalists and approved of the take over by Pablo Morillo, it was very difficult to get in and out of the city. Policarpa and her brother Bibiano entered the capital with forged documents and safeguards, and a letter of introduction written by Ambrosio Almeyda and José Rodríguez, two Revolutionary leaders; they recommended her and her brother stay in the house of Andrea Ricaurte y Lozano under cover of working as her servants. In reality, Andrea Ricaurte's home was the centre of intelligence gathering and resistance in the capital.

In Guaduas, Policarpa was known as a revolutionary. Because she was not known in Bogotá, she could move freely and meet with other patriots and spies unsuspected. She could also infiltrate the homes of the royalists. Offering her services as a seamstress to the wives and daughters of royalists and officers, Policarpa altered and mended for them and their families; at the same time, she overheard conversations, collected maps and intelligence on their plans and activities, identified who the major royalists were, and found out who were suspected of being revolutionaries. She visited the revolutionaries in prison, bringing them food, and keeping them informed with the patriot efforts. Additionally, she helped keep tabs on the loyal patriots, by documenting those who enlisted in the army, as well as those who donated money or valuable objects to the war efforts.

Policarpa also secretly recruited young men to the Revolutionary cause; with assistance from her brother. Together, they helped increase the number of soldiers the insurgency in Cundinamarca desperately needed.

== Capture ==
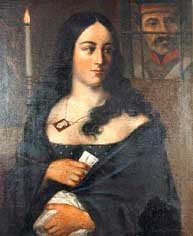
La Pola in the chapel, just before her arrest.

Salavarrieta knew that her capture was near, so she warned the fellow revolutionaries to destroy incriminating evidence, for her sake, as well as others. The names of involved patriots was written on many documents, therefore, Salavarrieta wanted the documents away from the hands of royal officers. Policarpa's operations ran smoothly and undetected until the Almeyda brothers were apprehended while carrying information back to the insurgents outside Bogotá. Their information directly linked La Pola to the Revolution. The Almeyda brothers and La Pola were implicated in helping soldiers desert the Royal Army and join the Revolution; transporting weapons, ammunitions and supplies to the insurgents; in helping the Almeydas escape from prison when they were captured in September of the same year, and finding them refuge in Machetá. They had hoped their connection with La Pola could come in handy in the event of a revolt in the city. The loyalists now suspected her of treason, but lacked solid evidence to accuse a seamstress of espionage and treason.

The arrest of Alejo Sabaraín while he was trying to escape to Casanare was the event that allowed the royalists to arrest La Pola; he was apprehended with a list of Royalist and Patriots given to him by Policarpa.

Sergeant Iglesias, the principal Spanish officer in Bogotá, was charged with finding and arresting her. Policarpa Salavarrieta and her brother Bibiano were both arrested at the house of Andrea Ricaurte y Lozano and taken to the Colegio Mayor de Nuestra Señora del Rosario, which had been turned into a makeshift prison.

== Trial and death ==
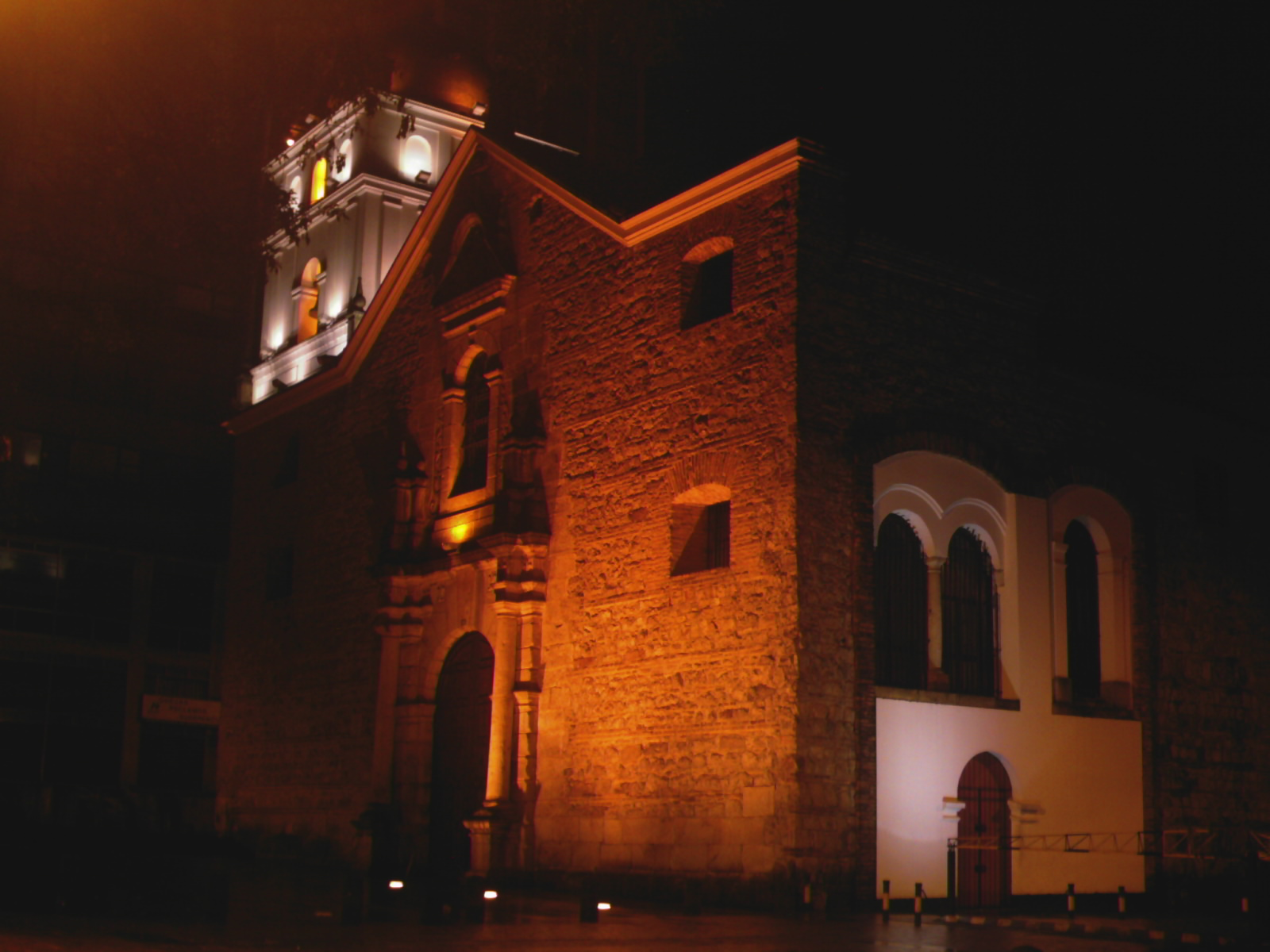
Church of San Agustín at night, La Candelaria, Bogotá.

They were taken to the Council of war and she was found guilty of conspiring against the Crown. On November 10, Policarpa, Alejo, and six other prisoners were sentenced to execution by firing squad, set for the morning of November 14, 1817.

The hour chosen for her execution was nine in the morning of November 14. Hands bound, La Pola marched to her death with two priests by her side and led by a guard. Instead of repeating the prayers the priests were reciting, she cursed the Spaniards and predicted their defeat in the coming Revolution. It is said that La Pola cursed the Spaniards relentlessly during the night before her execution. At one point she stopped, tired and thirsty, and one of the guards offered her a glass of wine. She tossed the glass right back at her captors, proclaiming "I would not accept even a glass of water from my enemies!"

She was to die with six other prisoners and her lover, Alejo Sabaraín, in the Bolívar Square. After ascending the scaffold she was told to turn her back, as that was the way traitors were killed. As she was led to her execution, Policarpa gave heart to the other prisoners and berated her captors. La Pola, refusing to kneel to the Spanish firing squad, yelled, the following in Spanish:

Viles soldados, volved las armas a los enemigos de vuestra patria. ¡Pueblo indolente! ¡Cuán distinta sería hoy vuestra suerte si conocierais el precio de la libertad! Pero no es tarde: ved que – aunque mujer y joven – me sobra valor para sufrir la muerte y mil muertes más. No olvidéis este ejemplo [...] Miserable pueblo, yo os compadezco. ¡Algún día tendréis más dignidad! [...] Muero por defender los derechos de mi patria.

-Policarpa Salavarrieta

translation in English:

Vile soldiers, turn your arms against the enemies of your homeland, indolent people! How different your fate would be today if you knew the price of liberty! But it is not too late: see that – though [I am] a woman and young – I have courage enough to suffer death and a thousand other deaths more. Do not forget this example [...] Wretched people, I pity you. Someday you will have more dignity! [...] I die to defend the rights of my homeland.

— Policarpa Salavarrieta

When the squad began shooting, Pola turned around to face the squad and was murdered.

As was customary, the bodies of Alejo and the other six prisoners were paraded and exhibited through the streets of Bogotá, to scare off would-be Revolutionaries. Being a woman, she was spared this final humiliation.

Her Augustinian friar brothers, José Maria de Los Ángeles and Manuel Salavarrieta, claimed the body, to give her a proper Christian burial in the convent church of San Agustín, in the neighborhood of La Candelaria.

== Historical significance and commemoration of Salavarrieta ==
=== Historical significance ===
Many historians of this period consider Policarpa Salavarrieta the most well-known woman of the Colombian War of Independence and of Spanish American wars of independence in general. In her time, the execution of a young woman for a political crime stirred the population and created significant resistance and discontent to the absolutist Royalist (Spanish American independence) regime imposed by Juan de Sámano which serves as an example of how the royalists own actions undermined support for the royalists among the civilian population of Viceroyalty of New Granada which were weary of the New Granada Civil War. While many women were similarly murdered during the Spanish occupation and many unknown examples of women spies, informers, or even fighters during the Independence Wars in Latin America, the case of La Pola captured the collective consciousness. Her death as a martyr during the Independence Wars inspired poets, writers and playwrights to immortalize her story, always highlighting her bravery and courage.

=== In Colombia ===
Statue of La Pola by Dionisio Cortés, located at Carrera 2 A on the corner of Calle 18, in the Las Aguas district, in La Candelaria in Bogotá.

Policarpa, Nariño municipality named after her.

A neighborhood in the Antonio Nariño district of Bogotá, and a station of Bogotá's mass public transit system, TransMilenio is named after her.

A housing development in Medellín,

A neighborhood called "La Pola" in Ibagué, in her honor.

A park called "La Pola" in La Plata, Huila in her honor.

A neighborhood and a school: the Policarpa Salavarrieta Educational Institution, in the south of Monteria.

. There is a monument of Policarpa Salavarrieta in Chiquinquirá.

=== In other parts of Latin America ===
- In Buenos Aires, Argentina, by Ordinance of the Municipality of November 27, 1893, a street running through the neighborhoods of Villa Lugano, Mataderos and Liniers and a metro tramway station were given the name "Pola".
- The play Pola Salavarrieta, historical drama in four acts, by Argentine politician and historian Bartolomé Mitre (1838).
- Hymn to La Pola (included in the Cancionero argentino in 1839.
- In 1944, Uruguayan playwright Sarah Bollo staged the historical tragedy entitled Pola Salavarrieta.
- In Panama, it inspired the myth of Rufina Alfaro, a legendary heroine and neighbor of the Villa de Los Santos associated with the cry for independence of the isthmus from Spain.

=== Day of the Colombian Woman ===
On November 8, 1967, Law 44 was passed by the Congress of the Republic of Colombia and signed by President Carlos Lleras Restrepo, which declared in its 2nd Article that November 14 would be the “Day of the Colombian Woman” in honour of the anniversary of the death of “Our heroine, Policarpa Salavarrieta”.

=== Colombian currency ===
Policarpa Salavarrieta has been depicted on Colombian Currency many times over the years, her portrait for a long time the only one of an actual female person (as opposed to idealized or mythological ones). Until 2016, the 10,000 peso note depicted her image, with that of her birthplace on the reverse.

=== Postage stamps ===
To commemorate the 100th anniversary of the independence of Colombia in 1910, the Government of Colombia issued a series of stamps that featured the images of some of the Heroes of the Independence, including Policarpa Salavarrieta, Simón Bolívar, Francisco de Paula Santander, Camilo Torres Tenorio and others. Between 1903 and 1904 the Department of Antioquia issued a blue 3 pesos stamp depicting La Pola (Scott catalogue, Antioquia number 154).

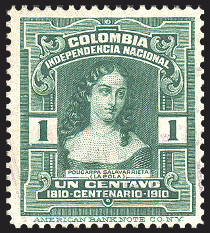
1¢ commemorative stamp (1910)

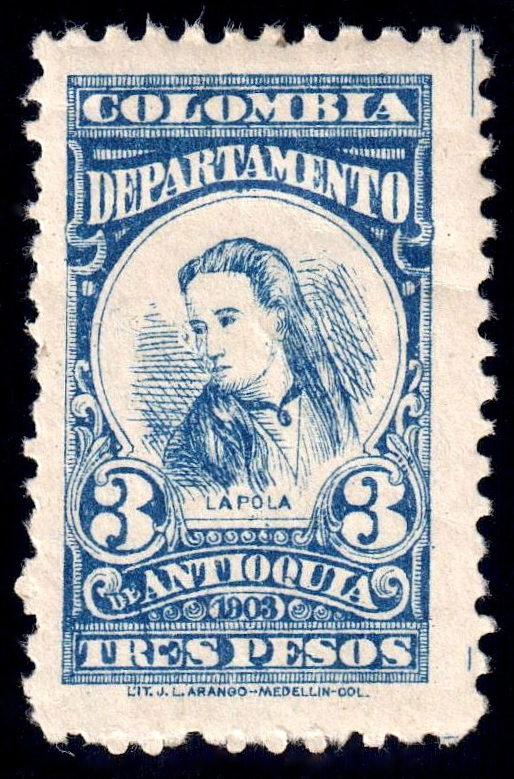
$3 Antioquia stamp (1903–04)

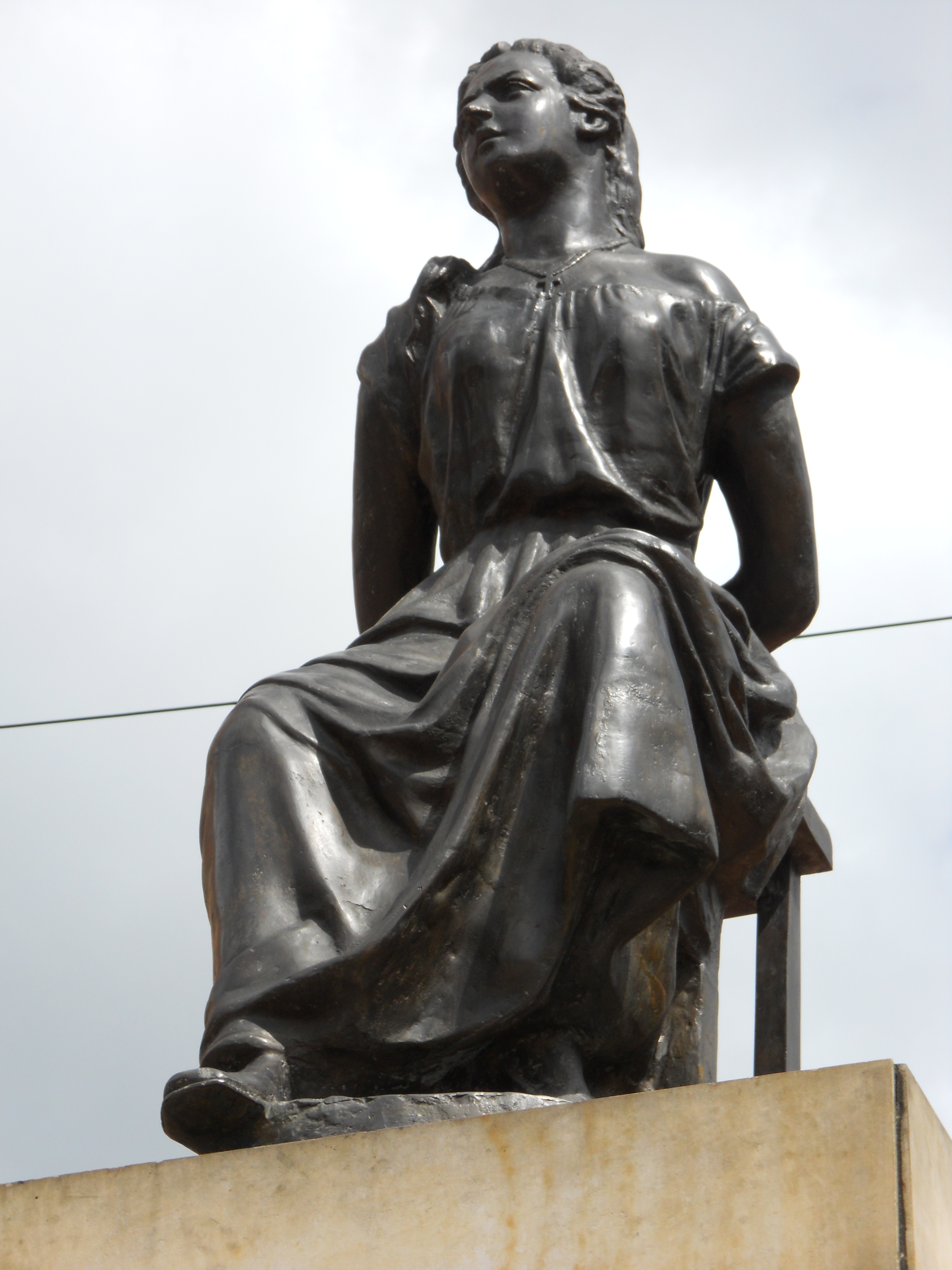
La Pola, 1910 by Dionisio Cortés Mesa. Bogotá.

=== Matronym ===
A new species of tarantula from Colombia, Pamphobeteus lapola Sherwood et al., 2022 was named in recognition of Policarpa Salavarrieta Rios.

== In popular culture ==
- Colombian actresses Carolina Ramírez and Ana María Estupiñán played the role of Policarpa Salavarrieta (as adults and teenagers respectively) in La Pola (TV series). It is a 2010 RCN TV telenovela based on her life directed by famous Colombian film director Sergio Cabrera which also featured as a protagonist Emmanuel Esparza as Alejo Sabaraín Ramos. The telenovela is a work of historical fiction which took many creative liberties centered on her life and that of other participants in the Colombian War of Independence, it nonetheless was very popular in Colombia itself.
- PoliCarpa y sus Viciosas, a Colombian punk band named after her.
- In 1911, the Bavaria Brewery (Colombia) launched a beer in her honor, named La Pola. This beer and advertising campaign was a strategy to compete with Chicha which was very fashionable at the time. Although this beer is no longer produced nationally, the slang term "pola" is nowadays commonly associated with beer in Colombia.

== See also ==
- Cola & Pola, Colombian beverage named after Policarpa
