= María Concepción Loperena =

Colombian independence activist and patriot

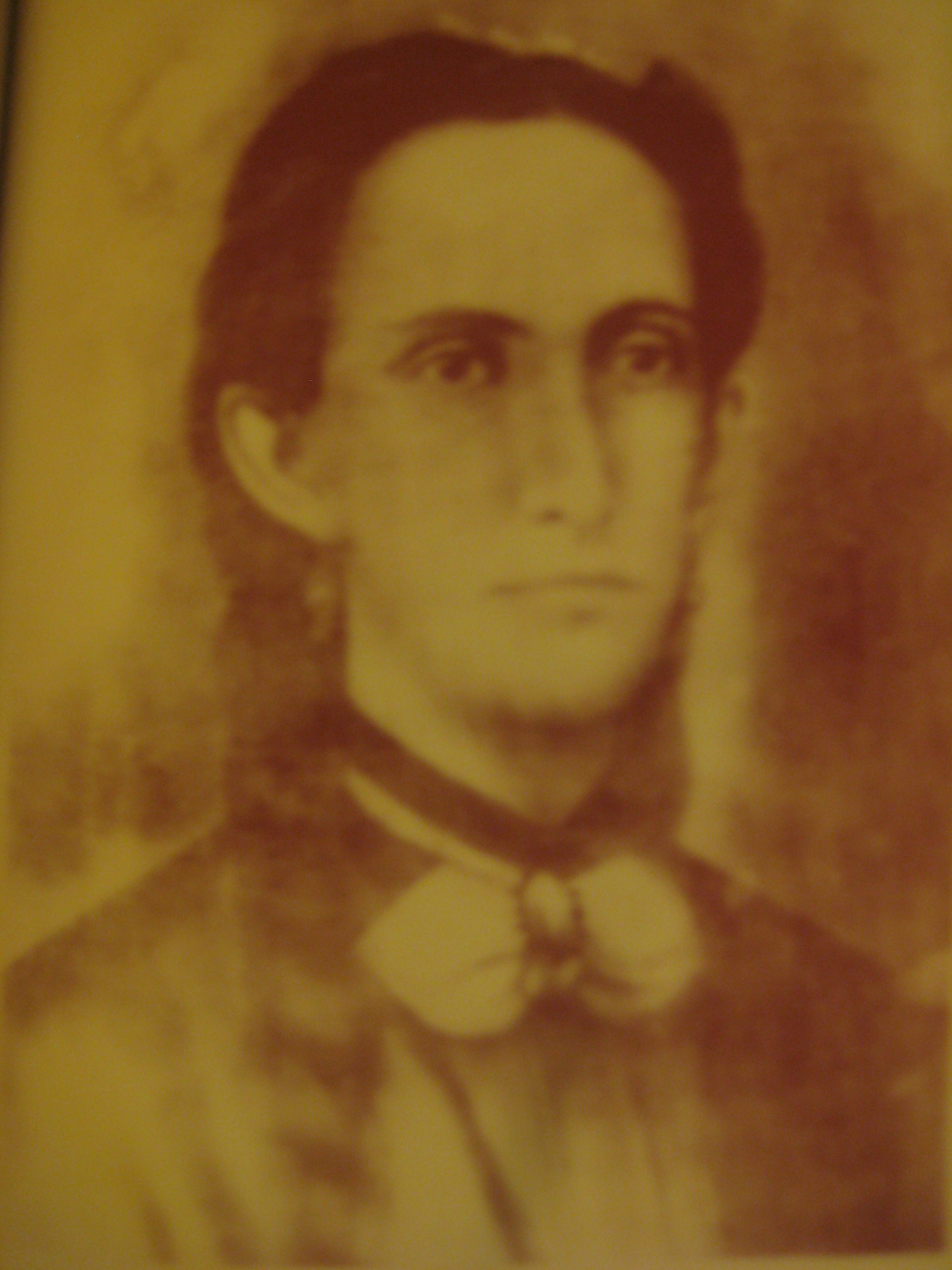
Maria Concepcion Loperena

María Concepción Loperena de Fernández de Castro (nickname, "La Loperena" or "La Heroína"; Valledupar, Viceroyalty of New Granada, 12 February 1775 - Valledupar, Republic of New Granada, 21 December 1835) was a Colombian independence activist and patriot who supported the armies of Simón Bolívar in the independence of Valledupar. She was also an abolitionist who freed hundreds of slaves on her properties in Becerril and La Jagua de Ibirico.

== Family ==
María Concepción Loperena was born in Valledupar, Viceroyalty of New Granada (now, Colombia), 12 February 1775. She was the daughter of the Spaniard, Pelayo Loperena, and María Josefa Ustáriz, from Valledupar. He served as Sergeant Major of the King's militias in the Government of Santa Marta Province. His father, Pelayo Loperena De Ponce y Carrión, arrived in the New Kingdom of Granada with the order of Captain of the Militias and advisor to the Government of Santa Marta. Governor De Paredo y Salcedo sent Pelayo Loperena to Valledupar in order to attend to the organization and collection of taxes and to serve at the same time as Prosecutor in the cases against some Spaniards for abuses against the indigenous Coyaimas people. Pelayo Loperena De Ponce y Carrión and his Spanish wife, María de la Trinidad de Molina y Zúñiga, decided to stay in the New Kingdom of Granada.

In 1885, María Concepción Loperena married the Terrateniente Gobernador, José Manuel Fernández de Castro Pérez Ruíz Calderón, who was born in Santa Marta. He was sent to Valledupar under the order of Santa Marta Governor, José de Astigarraga, to attend realengos, organize encomiendas, and taxes. He founded cattle ranches in Becerril and La Jagua de Ibirico. María Concepción Loperena took charge of these assets after becoming a widow.

== Revolution of 1812 ==
In 1812, María Concepción Loperena was the first to form a revolutionary environment in Valledupar. She sent her son, Pedro Norberto Fernández de Castro Loperena, with powers to deal with the then President of Cartagena, Manuel Rodríguez Torices, and receive instructions on the independence movement from Spain. She met with " El Libertador" Simón Bolívar in the town of Chiriguaná to carry out independence plans in Valledupar and the surrounding region. On the orders of Simón Bolívar, she organized and declared the act of independence of the city of Valledupar on February 4, 1813, at 10:00 in the morning. That same day, María Concepción Loperena granted freedom to hundreds of slaves that she kept on her estates in La Jagua de Ibirico and Becerril.

Supporters of the then mayor of Valledupar, the Marqués de Valde-Hoyos, who was fleeing due to the independence rebellion, gave the order to persecute her. In 1818, the then governor of Santa Marta, Pedro Ruiz de Porras, ordered his subordinates Juan Salvador Anselmo Daza and Buenaventura de la Sierra to arrest María Concepción Loperena and send her to Santa Marta. Not finding her, they took possession of many of her assets. The decree of October 19, 1821 issued in Villa del Rosario, Cúcuta ordered that María Concepción Loperena's possessions be returned to her.

== Precursor of education in Valledupar ==
María Concepción Loperena was a forerunner of education in Valledupar. By executive decree of October 6, 1820, the acting President of Gran Colombia, Francisco de Paula Santander, issued an ordered from Villa del Rosario, under the Law of August 6, 1821. María Concepción Loperena worked with Santander to create a national college in Valledupar. For this purpose, the Escuela de Primeras Letras del Método Lancasteriano was created at the request of María Concepción Loperena and specified so by the Decree of May 17, 1824. The school was installed in what was the Convent of the Dominican Fathers (today part of the Valledupar Council building).

== Death and legacy ==
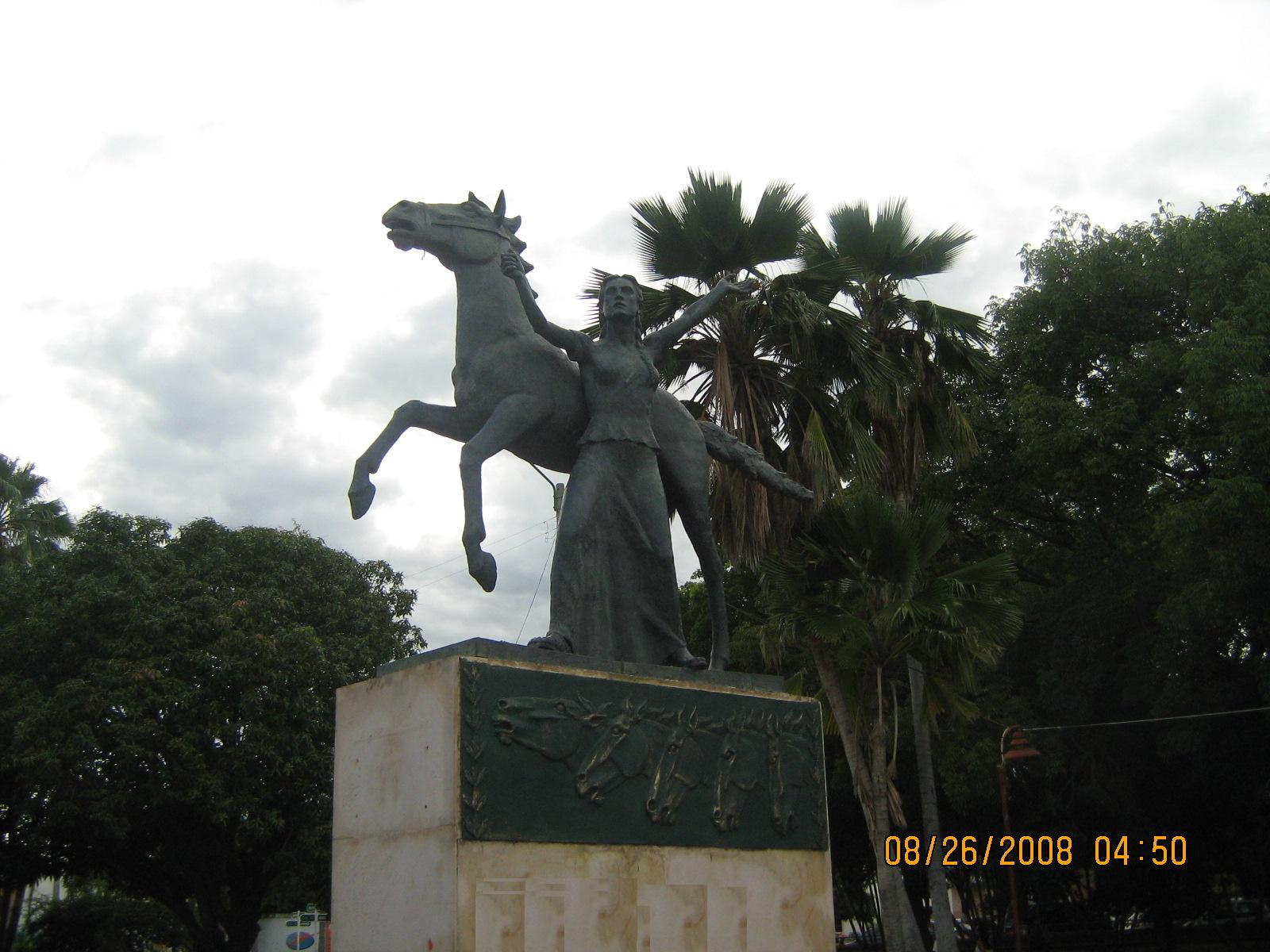
Statue of María Concepción Loperena de Fernández de Castro in Valledupar, Colombia.

It is presumed that María Concepción Loperena died on December 21, 1835. Her body was wrapped with the flag of the Republic of New Granada. Decrees were issued by the Legislative Assembly of the Sovereign State of Magdalena and the Congress of Colombia.

She was mourned in Valledupar with the suspension of many festivities, such as Christmas Eve and Easter. Funeral services were held in the Iglesia de la Concepción. Her body was buried in the city's cemetery. Later, her remains were removed by her son, José María Fernández de Castro L., and placed in the Iglesia Parroquial. Next, they were stolen by her daughter, María Concepción Fernández De Castro de Diaz Granados, who took them to her home. In 1850, the remains were placed again in the Iglesia de Sto. Domingo and two years later into a church.

By virtue of Law 95 of 1940, María Concepción Loperena were decreed to be a heroine, in a project presented by the senator of the republic, Pedro Castro Monsalvo.

Agreement 002 of February 14, 2004, was approved by the Valledupar Council, by which February 4 is institutionalized as a historical date in the municipality of Valledupar and the flag of the municipality is ordered to be hoisted in public establishments, especially in schools.

== See also ==
- List of people on the postage stamps of Colombia
