= Juan Friede =

Ukrainian-Colombian historian

- Born: February 17, 1901; Wlava, Russian Empire
- Died: June 28, 1990 (aged 89); Bogotá, Colombia
- Other name: Juan Friede Alter
- Education: Economical and Social Sciences
- Alma mater: Hochschule für Welthandel, Vienna; London School of Economics
- Known for: Studies of Muisca, San Agustín, indigenous peoples of Colombia, Spanish conquest, history of Colombia
- Children: three
- Scientific career
- Fields: Anthropology, history
- Workplaces: Universidad Nacional de Colombia

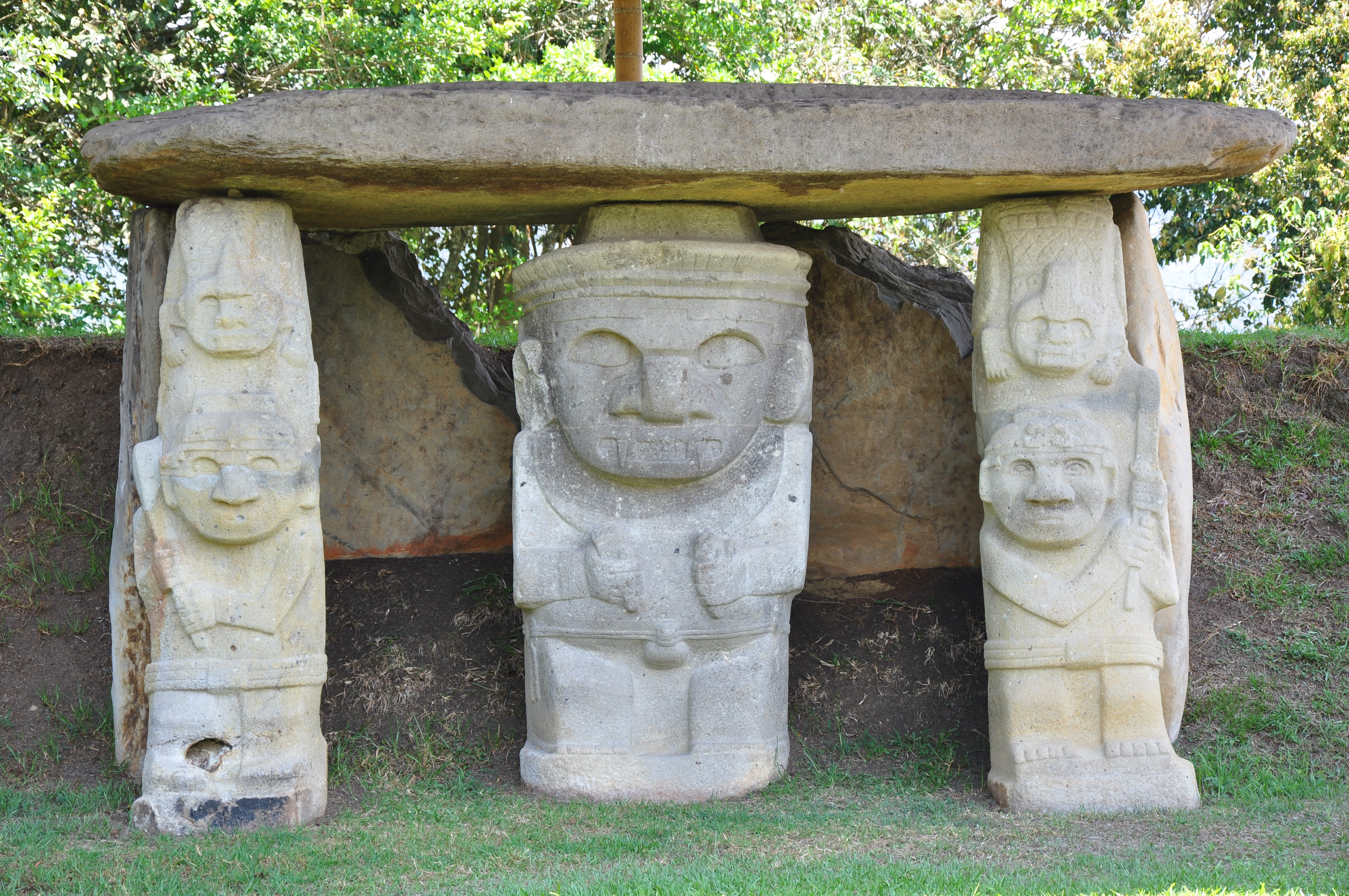
Friede made the first documentary about San Agustín in 1942

Juan Friede Alter (Wlava, Russian Empire, 17 February 1901 - Bogotá, Colombia, 28 June 1990) was a Ukrainian-Colombian historian of Jewish descent who is recognised as one of the most important writers about Colombian history, the Spanish conquests and a proponent of indigenism; the defense of the rights and descriptions of the oppression of indigenous people.

Juan Friede went to Colombia in 1926 for business and his fascination for the country, its climate and culture made him emigrate. He became a Colombian citizen in 1930. During the 1940s, Friede made extensive studies about various indigenous peoples in the country. He was a professor at the newly founded Department of Social Sciences of the National University of Colombia and is considered one of the pioneers of the "New History" movement in Colombia, together with Jaime Jaramillo Uribe, Luis Eduardo Nieto Arteta and Luis Ospina Vásquez. His former house in San Agustín since 2006 bears the name Casa Museo Juan Friede.

== Biography ==
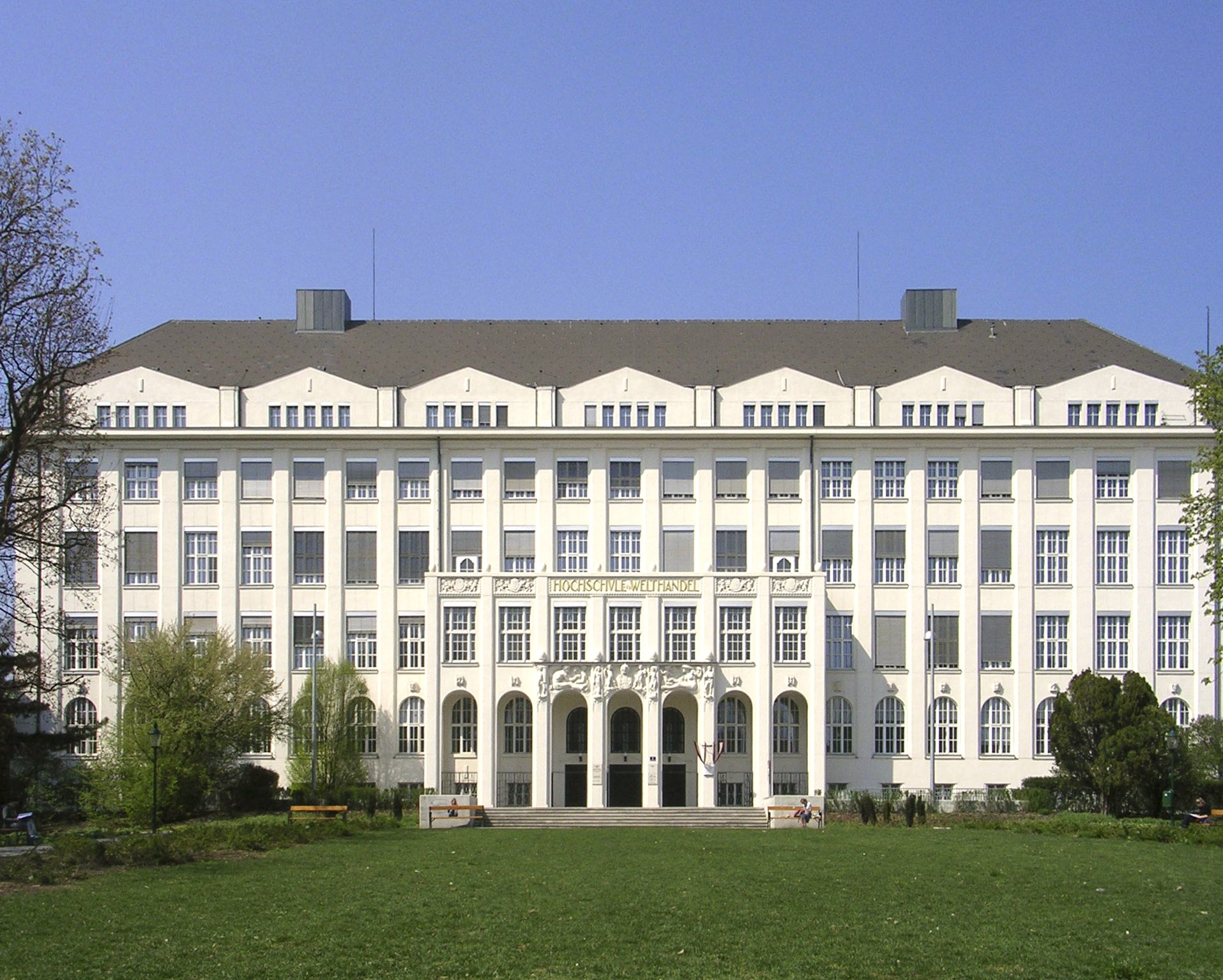
In 1922, Juan Friede graduated at the Hochschule für Welthandel in Vienna

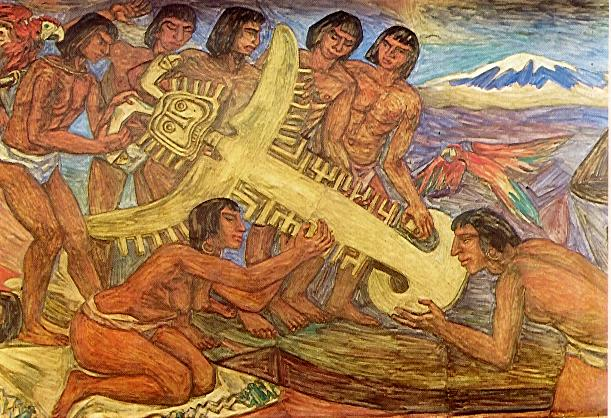
Friede founded the first art gallery of Bogotá, where he exposed works of Pedro Nel Gómez, painter of indigenous rituals

Juan Friede Alter was born in a village called Wlava, indicated as Ukrainian or Polish, close to the border with Germany, part of the Russian Empire on February 17, 1901, in a Jewish family. Friede went to school in Moscow in the turbulent years of the Russian Revolution of 1917. The new regime drove the family to Germany and Friede studied Economical and Social Sciences at the Hochschule für Welthandel in Vienna, graduating in 1922. The environment of Vienna of the 1920s influenced Friede positively and he was a member of an anarcho-ecological society called Vanderfliegel. After his studies in Vienna, he continued his research at the newly founded London School of Economics. In 1923, Friede started working for the import-export firm J. Stern & Co. The firm sent Friede to Colombia in 1926.

Friede arrived first in Cartagena and later in Buenaventura. He was so much impressed by the country, its climate, poverty and people, that he decided to emigrate. Juan Friede first settled in Manizales, working for J. Stern & Co in trading coffee, automobiles and other imports, a job offering him to travel through Colombia. On February 20, or March 3, 1930, Friede became a Colombian national. After a decline in the activities of J. Stern & Co., Friede worked for Caldas Motors, a subsidiary of Ford Motors from 1935 to 1941. In 1939, Friede moved from Manizales to Bogotá and in 1940 he opened the first art gallery in the Colombian capital. Two years later Colombian muralist Pedro Nel Gómez held an exposition in Friede's art gallery.

During the Holy Week of 1942, Friede made the first documentary about the important archaeological and UNESCO World Heritage Site San Agustín. This formed the onset of further studies of the indigenous people of Colombia between 1943 and 1946. He lived in San Agustín until the end of 1945. In 1944, Friede published his book El indio en la lucha por la tierra, where he described the continuous repression of the indigenous people of the department of Cauca.

Friede is considered together with Jaime Jaramillo Uribe, Luis Eduardo Nieto Arteta and Luis Ospina Vásquez, one of the founders of "New History" in Colombia, after writing a voluminous work about the conquests and indigenous history in his 1955 publication Documentos Inéditos para la Historia de Colombia.

In 1959 the Department of Social Sciences of the National University of Colombia was founded, where Juan Friede was one of the main professors. Between 1962 and 1990, Friede lived in Colombia and the United States.

Juan Friede has published 682 works in Spanish and English. He spoke fluent Russian, German, French, English and Spanish.

== Research by Juan Friede ==
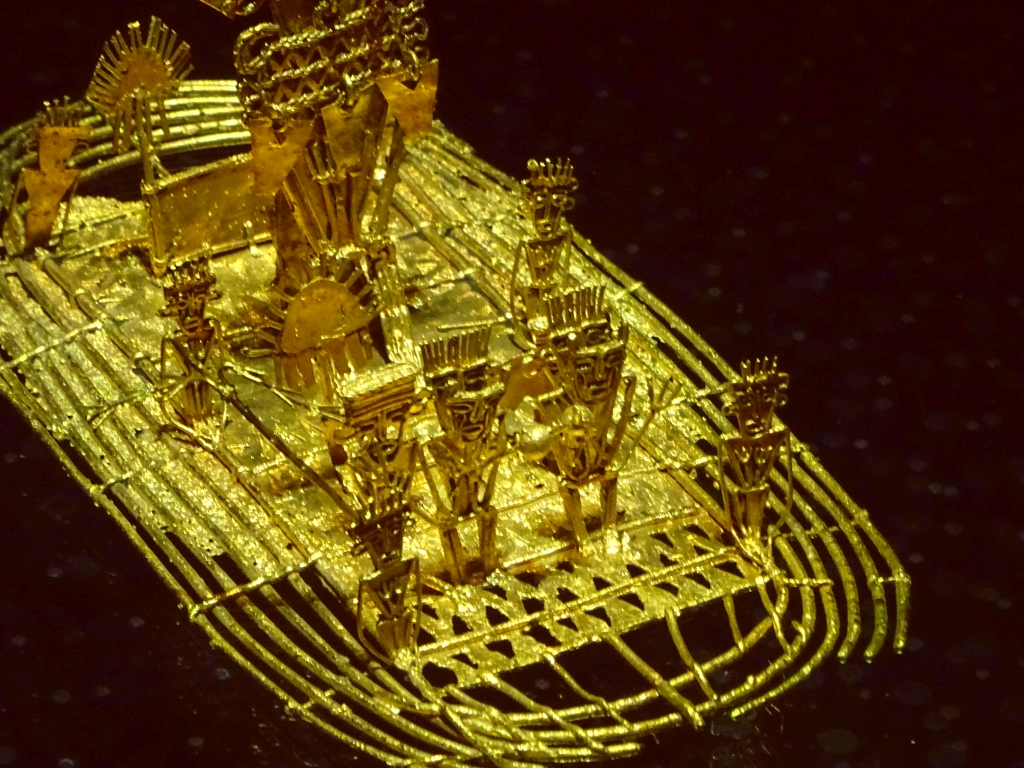
The conquest of the Muisca, famous for their fine goldworking, has been described in various works by Juan Friede

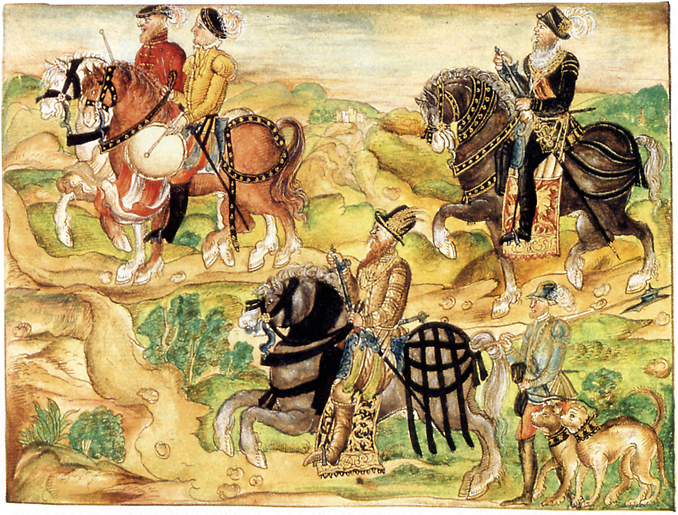
Friede wrote about the conquest in Venezuela and Colombia by the patrician Welser family from Augsburg

=== Indigenous peoples of Colombia ===
Friede has published various books and articles about the indigenous peoples of Colombia, among others the Muisca, Andaquí, Arhuaco, Kofán and Quimbaya.

=== Conquest ===
Many conquistadors as well as Spanish chroniclers in Colombia have been described in biographies by Juan Friede. On Pedro de Aguado, whose birth date is uncertain, he wrote that De Aguado was baptised in Valdemoro on January 26, 1513. Friede published about Rodrigo de Bastidas and others in La conquista del territorio y el poblamiento. The abuse of the indigenous people by Pedro de Heredia was reported by Friede in Fuentes documentales para la historia del Nuevo Reino de Granada: desde la instalación de la Real Audiencia en Santafé.

Juan Friede has published various works about the Spanish conquest of the Muisca and the foundation of Bogotá. He described the routes of the main conquistadors Gonzalo Jiménez de Quesada and Nikolaus Federmann towards the Bogotá savanna and Eastern Hills in Descubrimiento del Nuevo Reino de Granada y Fundación de Bogotá (1536–1539). In 1960, Friede published a review of Epítome de la conquista del Nuevo Reino de Granada, an early publication about the conquest expeditions of the Spanish against the Muisca and Panche of uncertain authorship. Friede maintains the work has been written entirely by Gonzalo Jiménez de Quesada, the main conquistador of central-Colombia.

=== History ===
Friede also published about the post-Spanish history of Colombia and Peru; the Battle of Boyacá in 1819, the Battle of Ayacucho in 1824, the foundation of the Mint in Bogotá in the seventeenth century, the history of Pereira and Popayán, especially Juan del Valle, and the Colombian painters Carlos Correa and Luis Alberto Acuña. Juan Friede Alter wrote a critical review of friar Pedro Simón, and together with Benjamin Keen he published a major biography of friar Bartolomé de las Casas in 1971.

== Works ==
This list is a selection.

=== Books ===
==== Indigenous people ====
- 1979 - Indígenas y represión en Colombia
- 1974 - Los chibchas bajo la dominación española
- 1973 - La explotación indígena en Colombia bajo el gobierno de las misiones el caso de los aruacos de la Sierra Nevada de Santa Marta
- 1963 - Los quimbayas bajo la dominación española : estudio documental 1539-1810
- 1963 - Problemas sociales de los aruacos: tierras, gobierno, misiones
- 1953 - Los andakí, 1538-1947: historia de la aculturación de una tribu selvática
- 1952 - Los Kofán: una tribu de la alta Amazonia colombiana
- 1944 - Comunidades indígenas del macizo colombiano
- 1944 - El indio en lucha por la tierra: historia de los resguardos del macizo central colombiano. Editorial Universidad del Cauca, Popayán, 2020
- 1943 - Los indios del alto Magdalena (vida, luchas y exterminio) 1609-1931

==== Conquest ====
- 1991 - Cristobal Colón y el encuentro de dos mundos
- 1979 - El Adelantado don Gonzalo Jiménez de Quesada
- 1974 - Biografía de Nicolás Federman, conquistador de Venezuela, 1506?-1542
- 1970 - Rutas de Cartagena de Indias a Buenos Aires y sublevaciones de Pizarro, Castilla y Hernández Girón, 1540-1570
- 1966 - Invasión del país de los chibchas, conquista del Nuevo Reino de Granada y fundación de Santafé de Bogotá: revaluaciones y rectificaciones
- 1965 - Historia extensa de Colombia. 2, Descubrimiento y conquista del nuevo reino de Granada: introducción
- 1965 - La extraordinaria experiencia de Francisco Martín (1531-1533)
- 1963 - Vasco Núñez de Balboa y el descubrimiento del oceano pacifico
- 1961 - Los Welser en la conquista de Venezuela
- 1960 - Gonzalo Jiménez de Quesada a través de documentos históricos; estudio biográfico
- 1960 - Vida y viajes de Nicolás Féderman, conquistador, poblador y cofundador de Bogotá, 1506-1542
- 1959 - El 450 aniversario del nacimiento de Gonzalo Giménez de Quesada
- 1959 - Geographical ideas and the conquest of Venezuela
- 1957 - Sebastián de Benalcázar en el descubrimiento del Nuevo Reino de Granada
- 1952 - Algunas observaciones sobre la realidad de la emigración española a América en la primera mitad del siglo XVI
- 1950 - Antecedentes histórico-geográficos del descubrimiento de la meseta Chibcha por el licenciado Jiménez de Quesada

==== General history ====
- 1974 - La Batalla de Ayacucho, 9 de diciembre de 1824
- 1971 - Bartolomé de las Casas in history: toward an understanding of the man and his work - with Benjamin Keen
- 1968 - La batalla de Boyacá, 7 de agosto de 1819, a través de los archivos españoles. Recopilación documental, transcrita y anotada
- 1964 - Fray Pedro Aguado y Fray Antonio Medrano, historiadores de Colombia y Venezuela
- 1963 - Acerca del nombre del Perú
- 1963 - Documentos sobre la fundación de la Casa de Moneda en Santa Fe de Bogotá (1614-1635) conservados en el Archivo General de Indias, Sevilla
- 1963 - Historia de Pereira
- 1961 - Vida y luchas de don Juan del Valle, primer obispo de Popayán y protector de indios; estudio documental basado en investigaciones realizadas en los archivos de Colombia, España y el Vaticano
- 1959 - La censura española del siglo XVI y los libros de Historia de América
- 1957 - Los franciscanos y el clero en el nuevo reino de Granada durante el siglo XVI
- 1945 - El pintor colombiano The Colombian painter, Carlos Correa

=== Articles ===
- 1963 - Colones alemanes en la Sierra Nevada de Santa Marta
- 1961 - El primer libro colombiano
- 1961 - La introduccion de mineros alemanes en America por la compañia Welser de Augsburgo
- 1960 - Quién fué el autor del "Epítome de la conquista del Nuevo Reino de Granada"?
- 1957 - Los franciscanos y el clero en el nuevo reino de Granada durante el siglo XVI
- 1956 - Nicolás Féderman en el descubrimiento del Nuevo Reino de Granada
- 1955 - La rebelión de Álvaro de Oyón
- 1952 - Las minas de Muzo y la "Peste" acaecida a principios del Siglo XVII en el Nuevo Reino de Granada
- 1951 - Book Review: Los Muiscas antes de la Conquista
- 1947 - El arte de los Kofán

== Trivia ==
- Juan Friede is featured on a Colombian postage stamp of 1997
- The wooden house where Friede lived in San Agustín was turned into the Casa Museo Juan Friede ("Juan Friede Museum") in 2006

== See also ==
- List of Muisca and pre-Muisca scholars
- Muisca
- San Agustín
- San Agustín Archaeological Park
