= Cola & Pola =

Colombian beverage

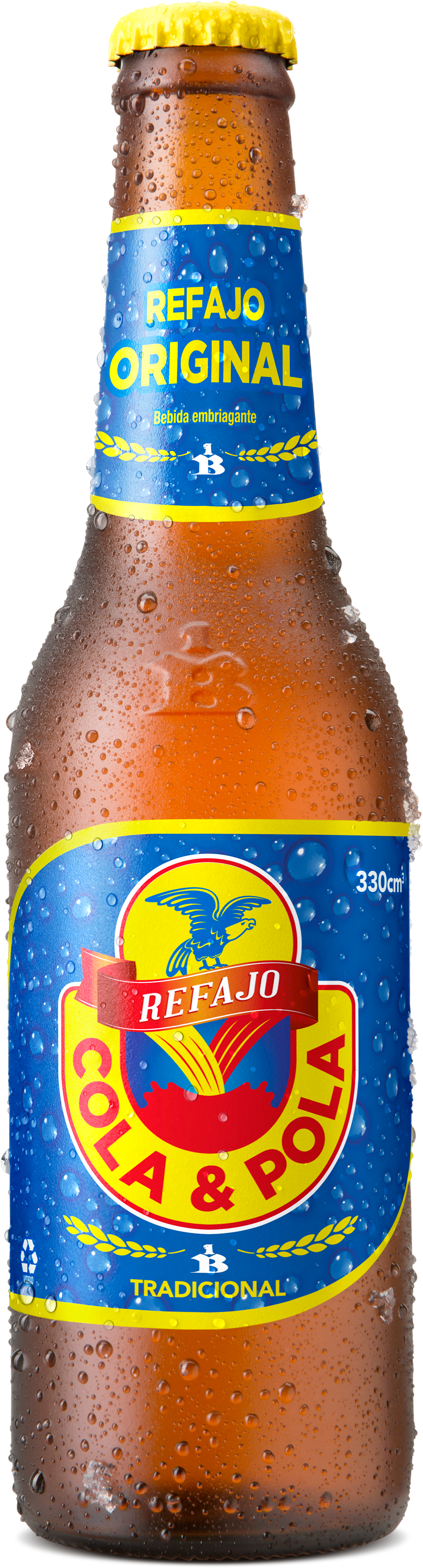
A bottle of Cola & Pola

Cola & Pola is a Colombian brand of drink. It is a type of shandy, known in Colombia as refajo, that mixes Champagne cola and beer. The drink was introduced in 1993 by Bavaria Brewery. It has an ABV of 2%, making it a low alcohol beer.

Apparently the drink is named after the two components the drink is made of. While the origin of the component cola is obvious, the word 'pola' is widely used in colloquial language to refer to beer. In 1910 Bavaria introduced a beer called 'La Pola', named in honor of a Colombian heroine, Policarpa Salavarrieta, who is known as "La Pola". Its popularity over the years has made "la pola" an informal synonym for beer, regardless the brand.

== See also ==
- Beer in Colombia
- Michelada
- Postobón
