= Miguel Triana =

Colombian engineer and historian

ir. Miguel Triana
- Born: 26 November 1859; Bogotá, Granadine Confederation
- Died: 29 April 1931 (aged 71); Bogotá, Colombia
- Education: Civil and military engineering
- Alma mater: Escuela de Ingeniería del Coronel Antonio de Narváez
- Known for: Muisca pictographs, numerals, religion
- Spouse: Juana Echeverri
- Children: Jorge Felipe Triana Echeverri (son)
- Scientific career
- Fields: Engineering, history
- Institutions: Universidad Nacional

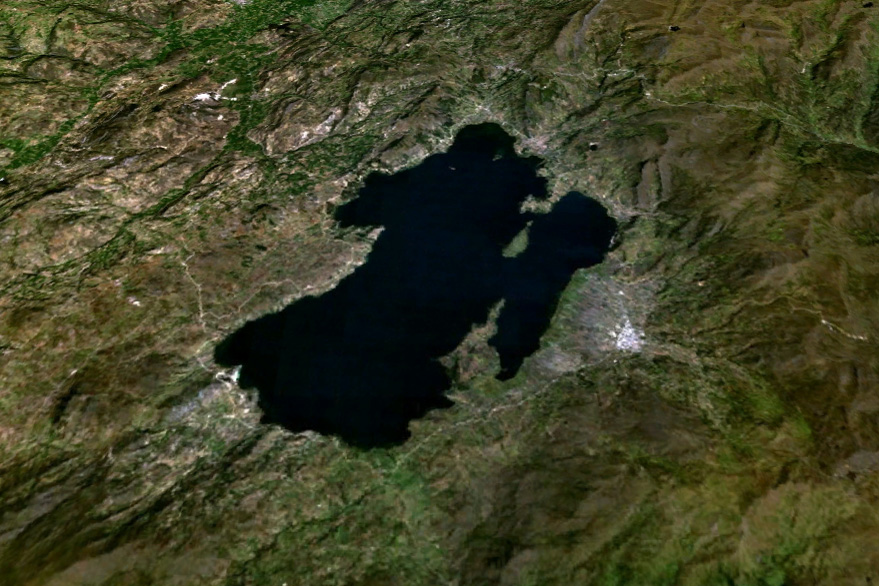
Miguel Triana studied the possibility of draining Colombia's largest lake, Lake Tota for irrigation around Sogamoso

Miguel Triana Ruiz de Cote (26 November 1859 – 29 April 1931) was a Colombian engineer and Muisca scholar. He is best known for his 1922 publication La Civilización Chibcha; "The Muisca civilisation". Triana wrote a number of books about the Muisca and their culture. Miguel Triana especially contributed to the knowledge of the religion, society and the creation of rock art throughout the Muisca Confederation. Triana was the first Colombian investigator relating the Muisca culture with the pictographs. He described hundreds of rock paintings and carvings in his book El jeroglífico Chibcha.

== Biography ==
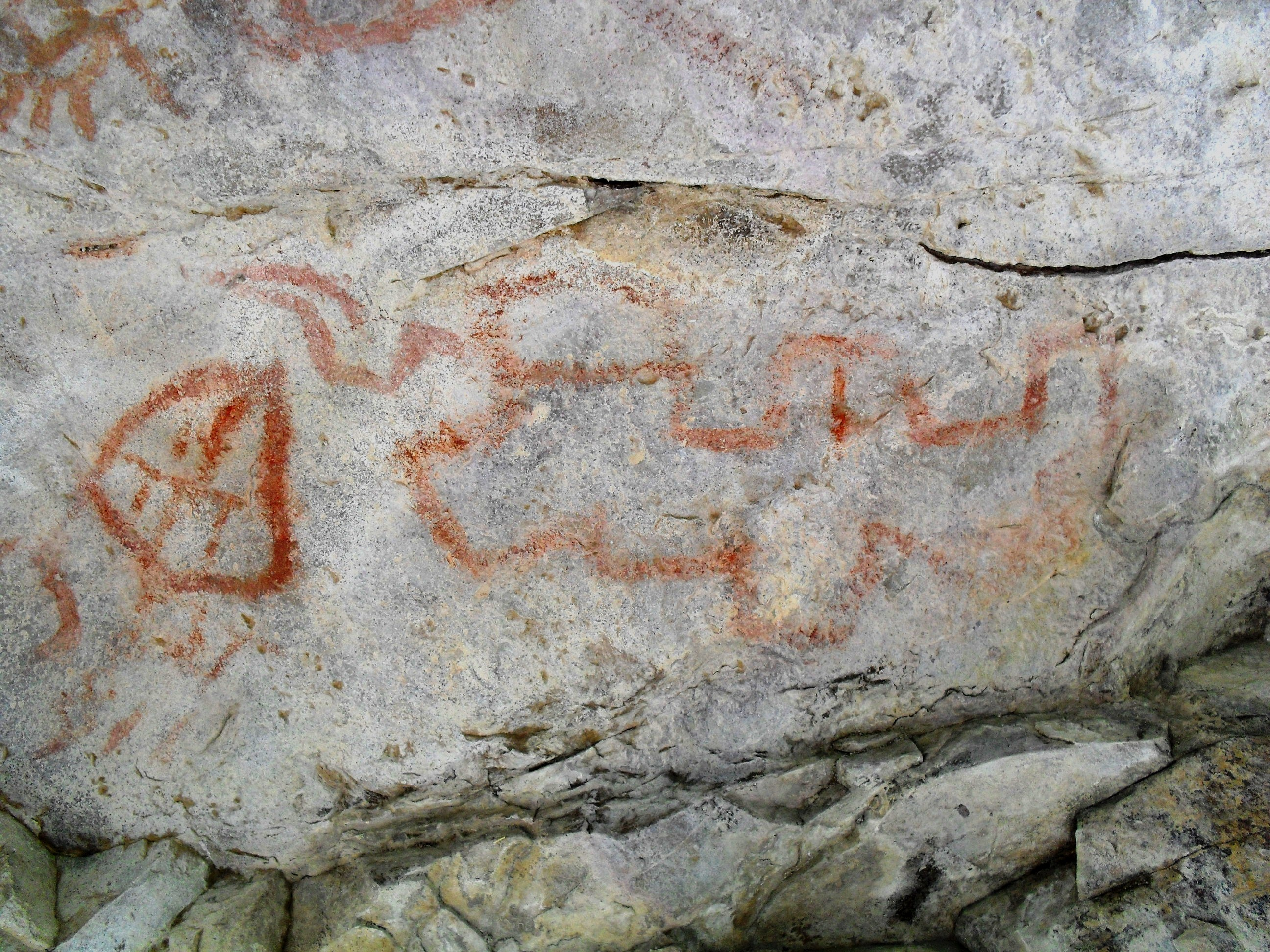
Pictographs in Sáchica, studied by Miguel Triana

The Muisca script, that consisted of only numbers, was studied by Triana

Miguel Triana was born on 26 November 1859 in the Granadine Confederation capital Bogotá as son of general Domingo de San Vicente y de los Santos Triana Loboguerrero and Dolores (or Clotilde) Ruiz de Cote. He had a brother Felipe Triana Ruiz de Cote. He attended the Colegio del Rosario until age 18 and studied civil and military engineering at the Escuela de Ingeniería del Coronel Antonio de Narváez where he graduated in 1880.

Triana worked as an engineer for the train line of Puerto Wilches, finished in 1883, the central northern highway and train tracks in Cúcuta and on irrigation projects in the Valley of Sogamoso as part of a study to dewater Lake Tota. From 1890 Triana was director of public works in Nariño and from 1917 manager of the Municipal Tramway of Bogotá.

Miguel Triana was professor in physics, hydraulics, geometry, trigonometry and drawing at the faculty of Engineering of the Universidad Nacional in Bogotá. He was affiliated with various organisations in Colombia, among others: Sociedad Físico-Literaria de Bogotá, El Ateneo, Sociedad de Ingenieros Civiles de los Estados Unidos, Sociedad Colombiana de Ciencias Naturales and the Sociedad Colombiana de Ingenieros, founded by Triana in 1887.

Triana was interested in the former inhabitants of the Altiplano Cundiboyacense where he was born and studied the history of the Muisca (also called "Chibcha", as the language they speak) and in 1922 he published his major work La Civilización Chibcha Other works are El jeroglífico Chibcha and Las leyendas Chibchas. The former work was the result of forty years of studying rock art in Boyacá, Cundinamarca, Meta and other parts of Colombia.

Miguel Triana married Juana Echeverri and the couple got one son, Jorge Felipe Triana Echeverri. Triana died on 29 April 1931 in his city of birth.

== Books ==
- 1970 - El jeroglífico Chibcha - posthumously
- 1950 - Por el sur de Colombia: excursión pintoresca y científica al Putumayo - posthumously
- 1924 - Petroglifos de la Mesa Central de Colombia
- 1922 - La civilización Chibcha
- 1915 - Improvements for the mouth of the Magdalena River
- 1913 - Al Meta
- 1907 - Por el sur de Colombia: excursión pintoresca y científica al Putumayo
- 2021 - Por el sur de Colombia, reedición de Editorial Universidad del Cauca https://www.unicauca.edu.co/editorial/

== See also ==
- List of Muisca scholars
- Muisca
- Muisca religion
- José Jerónimo Triana

== Notable works by Miguel Triana ==
- Triana, Miguel (1950) [1907], Por el sur de Colombia: excursión pintoresca y científica al Putumayo - Through the south of Colombia: pictoresque and scientific excursion to the Putumayo River (PDF) (in Spanish), Biblioteca Popular de Cultura Colombiana, pp. 1–346
- Triana, Miguel (1922), La civilización Chibcha (in Spanish), pp. 1–222

== Bibliography ==
- Bateman, Alfredo D (1973), Los fundadores de la sociedad geográfica de Colombia (PDF), Sociedad Geográfica de Colombia, pp. 1–23
- López Estupiñán, Laura (2011), Topando piedras, sumercé. Narraciones en torno a las piedras de Iza y Gámeza, Boyacá, Colombia - Bumping into stones, mister. Tales around the stones of Iza and Gámeza, Boyacá, Colombia (M.A.) (M.A.) (in Spanish), vol. 2, Rupestreweb
- Martínez Celis, Diego; Botiva Contreras, Álvaro (2004), Manual de arte rupestre de Cundinamarca - Manual of rock art of Cundinamarca (in Spanish), ICANH, pp. 1–60, ISBN 958-8181-07-0
