= Félix Restrepo Mejía =

Felix Restrepo Mejía S. J. (1887–1965) was a Jesuit priest, writer, pedagogue, classical scholar and humanist. Born in Medellín, Colombia, he was educated in Jesuit schools in this city and in Burgos and Oña (both in Spain) and Munich, Germany.

He was rector of the Pontificia Universidad Javeriana, also a Jesuit school, in Bogotá, between 1940 and 1949. By initiative of Jorge Eliecer Gaitán, (Minister of Education and later candidate to the presidency of Colombia, assassinated in 1949) founded the Ateneo Nacional de Altos Estudios (National Athenaeum of Higher Learning) which became later the Instituto Caro y Cuervo, one of the most prestigious philological and linguistic research institutions in the Spanish language.
