= Simona Duque de Alzate =

Colombian military personnel

- Born: March 30, 1773; Marinilla, Viceroyalty of New Granada
- Died: January 17, 1858 (aged 84); Marinilla, Colombia
- Occupation: Revolutionary
- Spouse: Antonio Alzate

Simona de la Luz Duque de Alzate (30 March 1773 – 17 January 1858) was a Colombian revolutionary.

Duque was the daughter of Andrés Duque, landowners in the region, and María Rincón. She married Antonio Alzate. Duque became a great symbol of the War of Independence of Colombia, by delivering five of her six children to then Lieutenant Colonel José María Córdova, who was moved by this act, love of the country accepts to incorporate them into rebel troops.

Córdova, trying to highlight the generous action of Doña Simona writes a letter to the general Francisco de Paula Santander in which he notes: "Such a sublime feature of love for the country deserves the greatest consideration from the government "' therefore General Santander decreed that the woman receive a full income for the rest of her life thanks to such a sublime feature of love for the homeland, Despite and despite her advanced age, Doña Simona refused to receive this pension while could work, however, faced with the pressure of her difficulties, she finally accepted.

Doña Simona died in Marinilla on January 17, 1858, at the age of 85. On her deathbed, her son Salvador asked her what orders she had to leave in case she died, and in a dying voice, although clear, she said: Let my children serve the country every time I need them.
