= List of first ladies of Colombia =

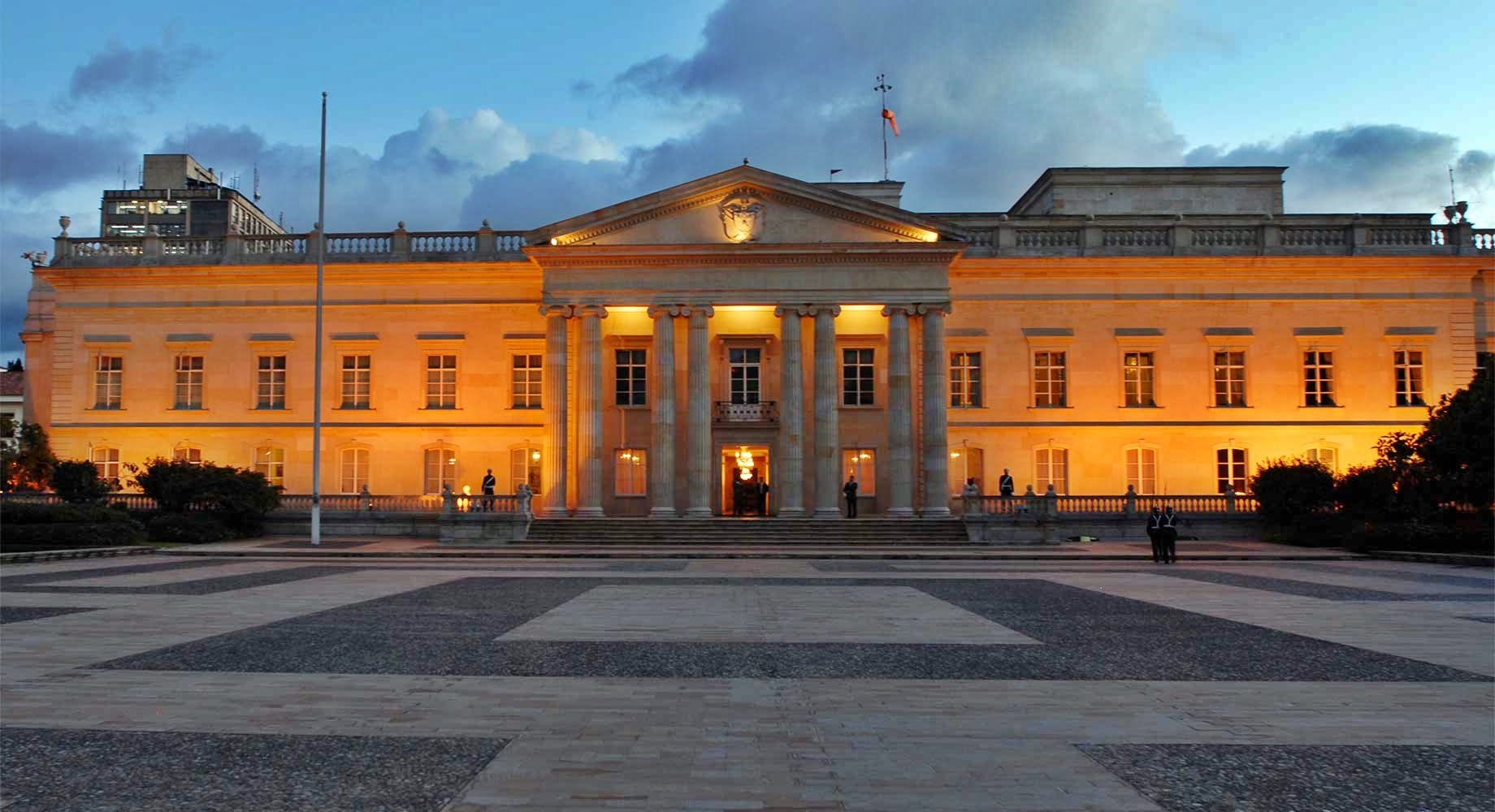
The Casa de Nariño, official residence of the first lady of Colombia

The first lady of Colombia is the hostess of the Casa de Nariño. The position is traditionally filled by the wife of the president of Colombia, but there is a possibility that the title may be applied to women who are not the president's wife, such as when the president is single or widowed, or when the president's wife cannot fulfill the duties of first lady. The first lady is not an elected position; He does not perform official duties nor receive a salary. However, he attends many official ceremonies and state functions alongside or instead of the president. Traditionally, the First Lady does not hold an outside job while in office. She typically has her own staff, including a general secretary. The Office of the First Lady is also in charge of all social and ceremonial events at the Casa de Nariño and is a branch of the Office of the President, reporting directly to the Administrative Department of the Presidency of the Republic. that is, there has never been a female president in this country.

There have been a total of 39 First Ladies.

Following Abelardo de la Espriella's inauguration on August 7, 2026, his wife, Ana Lucía Pineda, became the 37th official First Lady. There are seven living former First Ladies: Ana Milena Muñoz de Gaviria, Jacquin Strouss de Samper, Nohra Puyana de Pastrana, Lina Moreno de Uribe, María Clemencia de Santos, María Juliana Ruiz and Verónica Alcocer. The first First Lady was Soledad Román de Núñez. The wives of two presidents died before their husbands took office.

Two women who were not married to a president are still considered acting first ladies: Sofía Reyes de Angulo and María Antonia Suárez, the daughters of widowers Rafael Reyes and Marco Fidel Suárez.

== List ==
This list includes all individuals who served as first ladies, regardless of whether they were married to the sitting president. It is ordered according to the name by which the first ladies were commonly known.

PRECO No.	Portrait	Name	Tenure	Age at tenure start	President (Husband, unless noted)
1	Portrait de Soledad Román de Núñez, seconde femme de Rafael Núñez, président de Colombie.	Soledad Román de Núñez October 6, 1835 – June 19, 1924 (aged 89)	June 4, 1887 − August 7, 1888	51 years, 241 days	Rafael Núñez m. July 14, 1877
2		Margarita Caro de Holguín June 10, 1848 – April 26, 1925 (aged 76)	August 7, 1888 − August 7, 1892	40 years, 58 days	Carlos Holguín Mallarino m. June 29, 1878
3	Portrait de Soledad Román de Núñez, seconde femme de Rafael Núñez, président de Colombie.	Soledad Román de Núñez October 6, 1835 – June 19, 1924 (aged 89)	August 7, 1892 − September 18, 1894	56 years, 306 days	Rafael Núñez m. July 14, 1877
4		Ana de Narváez de Caro March 8, 1847 – March 23, 1909 (aged 62)	September 18, 1894 − August 7, 1898	47 years, 194 days	Miguel Antonio Caro m. February 15, 1873
5		Nazaria Domínguez de Sanclemente April 12, 1823 – November 12, 1882 (aged 59)	August 7, 1898 − July 31, 1900	75 years, 117 days	Manuel Antonio Sanclemente m. April 10, 1870
6		Matilde Osorio de Marroquín April 10, 1831 – March 20, 1884 (aged 52)	July 31, 1900 − August 7, 1904	69 years, 103 days	José Manuel Marroquín m. January 7, 1853
7		Sofía Reyes de Angulo April 12, 1878 – July 19, 1947 (aged 75)	August 7, 1904 − July 27, 1909	26 years, 117 days	Rafael Reyes; Father (Note: Reyes's wife, Sofía Angulo de Reyes, died before he assumed the presidency. His daughter, Sofía Reyes, served as first lady.)
8		Antonia Ferrero de González November 1, 1865 – March 2, 1944 (aged 78)	August 7, 1909 − August 7, 1910	43 years, 279 days	Ramón González Valencia m. July 27, 1885
9		Isabel Gaviria de Restrepo June 19, 1867 – June 9, 1944 (aged 76)	August 7, 1910 − August 7, 1914	43 years, 49 days	Carlos Eugenio Restrepo m. April 16, 1890
10		Elvira Cárdenas de Concha April 12, 1870 – June 22, 1935 (aged 65)	August 7, 1914 − August 7, 1918	44 years, 117 days	José Vicente Concha
11		María Antonia Suárez June 5, 1897 – August 5, 1950 (aged 55)	August 7, 1918 − March 3, 1919	21 years, 63 days	Marco Fidel Suárez; Father (Note: Suárez's wife, Isabel Orrantia, died before he assumed the presidency. His daughter, María Antonia, served as first lady until her marriage in 1919.)
11	Vacant		March 3, 1919 – November 11, 1921	Vacant	Marco Fidel Suárez; Widower
12	Cecilia Arboleda de Holguín	Cecilia Arboleda de Holguín January 21, 1859 – February 3, 1924 (aged 65)	November 11, 1921 − August 7, 1922	62 years, 263 days	Jorge Holguín m. August 9, 1877
13		Carolina Vásquez de Ospina December 4, 1896 – May 12, 1955 (aged 85)	August 7, 1922 − August 7, 1926	25 years, 246 days	Pedro Nel Ospina
14		Leonor de Velasco Álvarez July 30, 1907 – January 14, 1975 (aged 67)	August 7, 1926 − August 7, 1930	19 years, 8 days	Miguel Abadía Méndez m. June 5, 1926
15		María Teresa Londoño May 20, 1882 – May 5, 1962 (aged 79)	August 7, 1930 − August 7, 1934	48 years, 79 days	Enrique Olaya Herrera m. December 2, 1911
16		María Michelsen de López; February 17, 1890 – January 22, 1949 (aged 58)	August 7, 1934 – August 7, 1938	44 years, 171 days	Alfonso López Pumarejo m. May 26, 1919
17	First Lady Lorenza Villegas de Santos	Lorenza Villegas de Santos; October 5, 1899 – March 25, 1960 (aged 60)	August 7, 1938 – August 7, 1942	38 years, 306 days	Eduardo Santos Montejo m. January 6, 1917
18		María Michelsen de López; February 17, 1890 – January 22, 1949 (aged 58)	August 7, 1942 – August 7, 1945	52 years, 171 days	Alfonso López Pumarejo m. May 26, 1919
19		Bertha Puga de Lleras; Birth country: Chile; March 13, 1909 – August 9, 2007 (aged 98)	August 7, 1945 – August 7, 1946	36 years, 147 days	Alberto Lleras Camargo m. March 10, 1931
20		Bertha Hernández de Ospina; April 17, 1907 – September 11, 1993 (aged 86)	August 7, 1946 – August 7, 1950	63 years, 94 days	Mariano Ospina Pérez m. January 10, 1920
21		María Hurtado de Gómez; June 18, 1886 – January 13, 1971 (aged 84)	August 7, 1950 – November 5, 1951	64 years, 50 days	Laureano Gómez m. September 9, 1916
22		Clemencia Holguín de Urdaneta; June 5, 1894 – May 10, 1990 (aged 81)	November 5, 1951 – June 13, 1953	59 years, 8 days	Roberto Urdaneta m. June 3, 1917
23		Carolina Correa Londoño; January 25, 1905 – July 15, 1986 (aged 81)	June 13, 1953 – May 10, 1957	48 years, 108 days	Gustavo Rojas Pinilla m. May 10, 1930
24		Bertha Puga de Lleras; Birth country: Chile; March 13, 1909 – August 9, 2007 (aged 98)	August 7, 1958 – August 7, 1962	49 years, 147 days	Alberto Lleras Camargo m. March 10, 1931
25		Susana López de Valencia; September 17, 1910 – May 19, 1964 (aged 53)	August 7, 1962 – May 19, 1964 †	51 years, 324 days	Guillermo León Valencia m. August 9, 1931
25	Vacant		May 19, 1964 – August 7, 1966	Vacant	Guillermo León Valencia; Widower
26		Cecilia de la Fuente de Lleras; Birth country: Spain; October 7, 1916 – March 2, 2004 (aged 87)	August 7, 1966 – August 7, 1970	49 years, 304 days	Carlos Lleras Restrepo m. July 14, 1933
27	First Lady Arango	María Cristina Arango de Pastrana; October 15, 1928 – September 15, 2017 (aged 88)	August 7, 1970 – August 7, 1974	41 years, 296 days	Misael Pastrana Borrero m. February 20, 1951
28		Cecilia Caballero Blanco; September 30, 1913 – August 13, 2019 (aged 105)	August 7, 1974 – August 7, 1978	60 years, 311 days	Alfonso López Michelsen m. April 14, 1938
29		Nydia Quintero; August 28, 1932 – June 30, 2025 (aged 92)	August 7, 1978 – August 7, 1982	45 years, 344 days	Julio César Turbay Ayala m. September 10, 1948
30		Rosa Álvarez de Betancur; November 15, 1924 – June 4, 1998 (aged 73)	August 7, 1982 – August 7, 1986	57 years, 265 days	Belisario Betancur m. January 21, 1946
31		Carolina Isakson de Barco; Birth country: United States; January 6, 1930 – January 24, 2012 (aged 82)	August 7, 1986 – August 7, 1990	56 years, 213 days	Virgilio Barco m. July 1, 1950
32		Ana Milena Muñoz de Gaviria; Born January 29, 1956 (age 70)	August 7, 1990 – August 7, 1994	34 years, 192 days	César Gaviria m. June 20, 1978
33		Jacquin Strouss de Samper; Born February 22, 1952 (age 74)	August 7, 1994 – August 7, 1998	42 years, 166 days	Ernesto Samper m. June 16, 1979
34		Nohra Puyana de Pastrana; Born May 26, 1955 (age 71)	August 7, 1998 – August 7, 2002	43 years, 73 days	Andrés Pastrana m. March 20, 1981
35		Lina Moreno de Uribe; Born December 4, 1955 (age 70)	August 7, 2002 – August 7, 2010	46 years, 246 days	Álvaro Uribe m. December 1, 1979
36	Rodríguez de Santos in 2014	María Clemencia de Santos; Born November 13, 1955 (age 70)	August 7, 2010 – August 7, 2018	54 years, 267 days	Juan Manuel Santos m. September 10, 1987
37	Ruiz at the White House in 2019	María Juliana Ruiz; Born May 25, 1978 (age 48)	August 7, 2018 – August 7, 2022	40 years, 74 days	Iván Duque m. February 15, 2003
38	Verónica Alcocer in 2023	Verónica Alcocer; Born May 26, 1976 (age 50)	August 7, 2022 – August 7, 2026	46 years, 73 days	Gustavo Petro m. July 14, 2000
39		Ana Lucía Pineda; Born October 8, 1987 (age 38)	August 7, 2026 – present	38 years, 303 days	Abelardo de la Espriella m. December 13, 2008

== Other spouses of presidents of Colombia ==
Certain spouses of presidents of the Colombia are not considered first ladies of Colombia. Two presidents were widowed prior to their presidencies:

- Rafael Reyes was married to Sofía de Angulo from 1877 to 1898.
- Marco Fidel Suárez was married to Isabel Orrantia from 1895 to 1901.

Four presidents were divorced and remarried prior to their presidencies:

- Rafael Núñez was married to Dolores Gallegos from 1851 to 1872. He was later married to Soledad Román Polanco from 1877 until his death in 1894.
- Juan Manuel Santos was married to Silvia Amaya from approximately 1970 to 1972.
- Gustavo Petro was married to Katia Burgos from 1986 to 1990 and to Mary Luz Herrán from 1992 to 2000. He was later married to Verónica Alcocer since 2000.
- Abelardo de la Espriella was married to Yoly Illidge from 2001 to 2004.

Three presidents remarried after their presidencies:

- Alfonso López Pumarejo was married to Olga Dávila Alzamora from 1953 until his death in 1959.
- Julio César Turbay Ayala was married to Amparo Canal from 1986 until his death in 2005.
- Belisario Betancur was married to Dalita Navarro from 2000 until his death in 2018.

== See also ==
- Second Lady or Second Gentleman of Colombia
- First family of Colombia
- List of presidents of Colombia
- List of First Lady of Colombia firsts
- Hostess of San Carlos Palace
- First ladies and gentlemen of Argentina
- First Lady of Brazil
