= Lleras =

Lleras may refer to:

- Alberto Lleras Camargo (1906–1990), important Colombian diplomat and political figure
- Carlos Lleras Restrepo (1908–1994), important Colombian lawyer and political figure
- Cecilia de la Fuente de Lleras (1919–2004), First Lady of Colombia under (1966-1970)
- Germán Vargas Lleras (1962–2026), Colombian politician and lawyer
- Puerto Lleras, town and municipality in the Meta Department, Colombia
