= Lleras (surname) =

The surname Lleras is derived from an Asturian surname originally written "Llera", derived from the Asturian word "llera", meaning "hillside" or "sloping ground", eventually Castilianized as Lleras.

Variations of the Hispanic spelling "Lleras" include: Llera, Lleraz, Llerena, Llerandi and Llerasi.

The Lleras family has occupied a family seat in Gijón, in the north of Asturias.

== People with the Lleras name ==
=== Members of the Colombian political Lleras family ===
- Alberto Lleras Camargo (1906–1990), 17th and 21st president of Colombia, First Lady Bertha Puga de Lleras (1909-2007)
- Carlos Lleras Restrepo (1908–1994), 23rd president of Colombia, First Lady Cecilia de la Fuente de Lleras (1919–2004)
- Germán Vargas Lleras (born 1962), 12th vice president of Colombia, Second Lady Luz María Zapata (born 1967)

== See also ==
- Caro (surname)
