= María Hurtado de Gómez =

First Lady of Colombia from 1950 to 1953

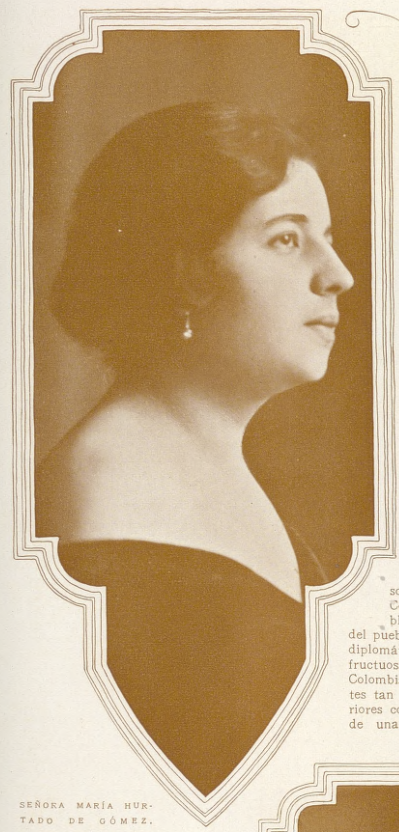
- Portrait c. 1924.

First Lady of Colombia
- In role August 7, 1950 – June 13, 1953
- President: Laureano Gómez
- Preceded by: Bertha Hernández de Ospina
- Succeeded by: Clemencia Holguín de Urdaneta

Personal details
- Born: María Hurtado Cajiao; March 18, 1876 Bogotá, D.C., Colombia
- Died: May 13, 1971 (aged 94) Bogotá, D.C., Colombia
- Resting place: Central Cemetery of Bogotá
- Party: Conservative
- Spouse: Laureano Gómez (m. 1916)
- Children: Álvaro; Enrique; Cecilia; Rafael

María Hurtado de Gómez (née Hurtado Cajiao; March 18, 1876 - May 13, 1971) was the First Lady of Colombia from 1950 to 1953 as wife of the 18th President Laureano Gómez

== First Lady of Colombia (1950-1953) ==
Laureano Gómez was elected president of Colombia in the 1949 presidential elections, when he presented himself as the only candidate, after the resignation of the Liberal candidate Dario Echandia, due to a lack of guarantees from the government in the face of the murder of his brother.

María discreetly took care of the prisoners in Colombia, and later, continuing the work of former first lady María Michelsen de López, she helped underprivileged children in her country.

Laureano Gómez's health was improving so that on November 5, 1951, he appointed his Minister of Government Roberto Urdaneta to act as Acting President of Colombia during his health treatments.

Honorary titles
Preceded by Bertha Hernández de Ospina	First Lady of Colombia; 1950–1953	Succeeded by Clemencia Holguín de Urdaneta
