= Esmeralda Arboleda Cadavid =

Colombian politician

Colombia Ambassador to Austria
- In office 1966–1968
- President: Carlos Lleras Restrepo
- Preceded by: Ignacio Escobar López
- Succeeded by: Vicente Huertas de Francisco

10th Minister of Communications of Colombia
- In office 1 September 1961 – 7 August 1962
- President: Alberto Lleras Camargo
- Preceded by: Carlos Martín Leyes
- Succeeded by: Alfredo Araújo Grau

Senator of Colombia
- In office 20 July 1958 – 1 September 1961
- In office 1966–1967

Personal details
- Born: Maria Esmeralda Arboleda Cadavid; 7 January 1921 Palmira, Valle del Cauca, Colombia
- Died: 16 April 1997 (aged 76) Bogotá, D.C., Colombia
- Party: Liberal
- Spouse(s): Samuel Uribe Hoyos (1946–1968); Francisco Cuevas Cancino (1968–1997)
- Education: University of Cauca (LLB, 1939)
- Profession: Lawyer

María Esmeralda Arboleda Cadavid (January 7, 1921 – 16 April 1997) was a Colombian politician, suffragist and the first woman elected to the Senate of Colombia, serving from 1958 to 1961.

A leader of the women's suffrage movement in Colombia, she and fellow suffragist Josefina Valencia Muñoz were the first women appointed to a national legislative position in Colombia as part of the National Constituent Assembly in 1954, where they presented what would eventually be the Legislative Act No. 3, which modified Article 171 of the Colombian Constitution of 1886 granting universal suffrage to women. She also served as the 10th Minister of Communications of Colombia, as Ambassador of Colombia to Austria, and as Deputy Permanent Representative of Colombia to the United Nations.

== Career ==
She entered private practice in Cali, where she focused on labour law concerning the disparity in wages by the Pacific Railway to its employees. She later moved to Bogotá, where she entered the women's suffrage movement.

She was involved in the National Feminist Organization of Colombia, which operated under the leadership of María Currea Manrique and former First Lady of Colombia Bertha Hernández Fernández .

When General Gustavo Rojas Pinilla came to power in a military coup d'état, the women's suffrage movement had an ideological split between those who opposed military rule and those who supported the regime. Arboleda became an ardent opponent of military rule, and publicly voiced her concern for and criticism of the President. Pressured by both sides, President Rojas, who had maintained the National Constituent Assembly begun by his predecessor, the deposed Roberto Urdaneta Arbeláez, named two women to the assembly. Arboleda was appointed to represent the Liberal Party, and Josefina Valencia Muñoz to represent the Conservative Party, becoming the first women to serve in a Colombian national legislative body. As part of the assembly, they introduced the Legislative Act on the Citizenship of Women. On 25 August 1954 the plenary of the National Constituent Assembly approved the Legislative Act No. 3 which modified Article 171 of the Colombian Constitution of 1886, granting universal suffrage to all Colombian women.

Arboleda continued her vocal opposition to and criticism of the Government of President Rojas; for this, she was harassed, spied on, and threatened. The Government pressured Bavaria S.A., where her husband worked, to fire Uribe to pressure his wife. The escalation reached its apex when a group of men tried to kidnap her in front of her mother's flower shop. She then went into exile with her husband and child to Boston, where her sister Violeta Arboleda was living with her husband Irving Glickman. She returned to the country in 1958 at toward the end of military rule, and ran for office in the 1958 legislative elections; She was elected Senator of Colombia and was sworn in as the first female senator of Colombia on 20 July when Congress convened following a four-year hiatus.

On September 1, 1961, she was appointed Minister of Communications by President Alberto Lleras Camargo, a post she held for the remainder of President Lleras's term. She also served as Ambassador of Colombia to Austria, concurrently serving as Non-Resident Ambassador to Yugoslavia, and Minister Resident to the United Nations International Organizations in Vienna.

In 1968, she was appointed by President Carlos Lleras Restrepo Deputy Permanent Representative of Colombia to the United Nations serving under then ambassador Julio César Turbay Ayala. It was during this assignment that she met Francisco Cuevas Cancino, Permanent Representative of Mexico to the United Nations, whom she married in 1968 during a ceremony on the grounds of the United Nations Headquarters. She also worked as Special Rapporteur of the United Nations Commission on the Status of Women, and as consultant for UNESCO for International Women's Year.

== Personal life ==
Arboleda's father was the mayor of Palmira, Fernando Arboleda Lopez and her mother was Rosa Cadavid Medina. Arboleda had five sisters, Pubenza, Fabiola, Violeta, Mireya, and Soffy. She was named after Esmeralda from The Hunchback of Notre-Dame by Victor Hugo.

Arboleda married Samuel Uribe Hoyos in August 1947. Baldomero Sanín Cano was in attendance. Arboleda and Uribe raised one child, Sergio. Uribe died in 1968 and Arboleda married Mexican diplomat Francisco Cuevas Cancino.

Arboleda died on April 16, 1997, after a battle with breast cancer.

== Legacy ==
Much of Arboleda's work can be found in the Luis Ángel Arango Library in Bogotá, thanks to donations by her son, Sergio.

On International Women's Day in 2021, President Iván Duque Márquez and Vice President Marta Lucía Ramírez created the Esmeralda Arboleda Order of Merit to honor those who have fought for gender equality and for women's right to vote in Colombia. Ramírez said there would be five categories of the order of merit.

In 2022, it was announced that a Spanish-language feature film, Estimados Señores (Dear Gentlemen), was in production on the life of Arboleda. It was written and will be directed by Patricia Castañeda and will star Julieth Restrepo in the title role.
