= Inauguration of Abelardo de la Espriella =

2026 Colombian presidential inauguration

Presidential inauguration of Abelardo de la Espriella
- Date: August 7, 2026; 2 months ago
- Time: 3:00 pm (COT)
- Location: Santiago de Cali University Cali
- Participants: Abelardo de la Espriella; 36th president of Colombia — Assuming office José Manuel Restrepo; 14th vice president of Colombia — Assuming office Honorio Henríquez; President of the Senate — Administering oath Gustavo Petro; 35th president of Colombia — Leaving office Francia Márquez; 13th vice president of Colombia — Leaving office

Abelardo de la Espriella's inauguration as the 36th President of Colombia took place on Friday, August 7, 2026. It was the 40th Colombian presidential inauguration marking the beginning of his four-year term as president and José Manuel Restrepo as vice president. The ceremony was held in the Auditorium of the Santiago de Cali University in Cali, Valle del Cauca.

This was the third presidential inauguration held outside the National Capitol in Bogotá, D.C.. The last time was the presidential inauguration of Manuel Antonio Sanclemente in 1898 in Villeta, Cundinamarca.

== Context ==
The ceremony marked the end of the presidential transition period for Abelardo de la Espriella, who became president-elect after defeating the candidate of the Historic Pact, Iván Cepeda, on June 21, 2026. The victory of De La Espriella and his running mate, José Manuel Restrepo, was confirmed by the National Electoral Council, which later issued the official certification on June 25, 2026, formalizing the election.

The election saw the highest voter turnout in the history of Colombian presidential elections. De La Espriella will become the second president from Córdoba, after Gustavo Petro (his predecessor). José Manuel Restrepo becomes the second Rector of the Universidad del Rosario to become vice president; the last was José Manuel Marroquín (1898-1900).

== Planning ==
Following De La Espriella's election as president in the 2026 presidential election, rumors began circulating about the location of his presidential inauguration. During his presidential campaign, he had announced that it would take place at a garrison in Popayán, Cauca. This was later confirmed by De La Espriella himself but subsequently rejected by President Gustavo Petro. Constitutional experts argued that it was erroneous and even unconstitutional for De La Espriella to be sworn in at a military garrison. Senator Agmeth Escaf explained, The President of the Republic is sworn in before Congress, not before an armed force, not by a rank; he is sworn in as a civilian to a government position.

On July 22, the Senate, and subsequently the Chamber of Representatives on July 28, approved that his inauguration would be held in Popayán, Cauca, without specifying a garrison. President Gustavo Petro subsequently issued strict orders to the Military Forces of Colombia not to lend any military installations for the inauguration. Petro would later state, The president obeys the people, not the military. On Wednesday, July 29, Congress unanimously ratified the decision to move the inauguration to Cali. The vote was 58 in favor and 30 against.

Subsequently, the inauguration ceremony would be moved to the Arena USC of the Santiago de Cali University in Cali, Cauca Valley.

=== Attendees ===
De La Espriella's inauguration was attended by several foreign leaders. Among them were;

Former presidents César Gaviria, Andrés Pastrana, Álvaro Uribe, and Iván Duque attended the inauguration. Former first ladies Ana Milena Muñoz de Gaviria and María Juliana Ruiz also attended the inauguration, but former first ladies Nohra Puyana de Pastrana and Lina Moreno de Uribe was absent. Outgoing president Gustavo Petro and former presidents Ernesto Samper and Juan Manuel Santos were absent. Former vice president Marta Lucía Ramírez, former second gentleman Álvaro Rincón and former second lady Martha Blanco de Lemos attended. Former vice presidents Humberto de la Calle, Gustavo Bell, Francisco Santos, Angelino Garzón, and Óscar Naranjo were absent.

Several world leaders attended, including, Argentine President Javier Milei, Karina Milei, Chilean President José Antonio Kast, First lady Pía Adriasola, Prime Minister of Curaçao Gilmar Pisas, Dominican President Luis Abinader, Ecuadorian President Daniel Noboa, First lady Lavinia Valbonesi, Honduran President Nasry Asfura, Paraguayan President Santiago Peña, First lady Leticia Ocampos, Panamanian President José Raúl Mulino and Spanish King Felipe VI. Representatives of heads of state were also present, including, Guatemalan Vice President Karin Herrera, Salvadoran Vice President Félix Ulloa, Israeli Foreign Minister Gideon Sa'ar, Swedish Foreign Minister Maria Malmer Stenergard, Peruvian Foreign Minister Carlos Espá, Moroccan Minister of Foreign Affairs Nasser Bourita, US Attorney General Todd Blanche. The ceremony was also attended by other public figures, such as Gianni Infantino, Maria Corina Machado and Silvia Tcherassi.

The ceremony set a record with the largest number of regional leaders included: Governor of Atlántico Eduardo Verano de la Rosa, Governor of Antioquia Andrés Julián Rendón, Mayor of Barranquilla Alejandro Char, Governor of Cauca Valley Dilian Francisca Toro, Governor of Córdoba Erasmo Zuleta, Governor of Sucre Lucy Inés García Mayor of Cali Alejandro Eder, First lady Taliana Vargas, Mayor of Bogotá Carlos Fernando Galán, First lady Carolina Deik, Mayor of Medellín Federico Gutiérrez and First lady Margarita Gómez.

=== Ceremony ===
The ceremony followed the following order in the schedule of events on August 7, 2026.

| Event | Time | Location | Description | Ref. |
|---|---|---|---|---|
| Swearing-In Ceremony | 4:00 p.m. ET | Santiago de Cali University Auditorium | During the swearing-in ceremony, the president-elect and vice president-elect took the oaths of office. | |
| Interreligious Discourse | 5:00 p.m. ET | Santiago de Cali University Auditorium | Following the oath ceremony, the ceremony included a recitation of messages from Judaism, Catholicism and Evangelicalism, followed by a musical performance by Maía to the Virgin Mary. | |
| Review of the Military Forces | 6:00 p.m. ET | Pichincha Battalion | After the inaugural speech at the Pichinca Battalion, the president reviewed the military forces that formed the processional escort, among which were the generals of the National Army, Aerospace Force, National Navy, National Police, the General of the Military Forces and the General of the Joint Command. | |

=== Oaths of office ===
Senate President Honorio Henríquez administered the presidential oath of office to President Abelardo de la Espriella. It was the first time the president received a military baton. This is neither regulated nor a tradition or obligation; presidents do not have a baton to represent their command as commander-in-chief of the armed forces. President Abelardo de la Espriella then administered the vicepresidential oath of office to Vice President José Manuel Restrepo.

== Boycott ==
Several members of the Historic Pact Party at the 10th Congress decided to boycott the inauguration. This boycott was perceived as an initial show of opposition to the incoming administration and its policies.

Several reasons were given for the boycott, including the increased cost of the inauguration, which cost twice as much as the previous presidential inauguration. As of July 27, the following is a list of the members of Congress who publicly stated they would not attend the inauguration.

- Carolina Corcho
- Pedro Flórez
- Patricia Caicedo
- Wilson Arias
- Laura Ahumada
- Walter Rodríguez
- Ferney Silva
- Esmeralda Hernández
- Alberto Benavides
- Sandra Chindoy
- María Eugenia Londoño
- Alex Flórez
- Kamelia Zuluaga
- Agmeth Escaf
- Yaini Isabel Contreras
- Isabel Zuleta
- Martín Carabalí
- Johana Osorio
- David Racero
- Aída Avella
- Mary Jurado
- Miguel De La Hoz García
- Kevin Gómez
- Alejandro Ocampo
- Alejandra Omaña

== See also ==
- 2026 Colombian presidential election
- Abelardo de la Espriella
- José Manuel Restrepo
