= 1966 Colombian presidential election =

- 1 May 1966
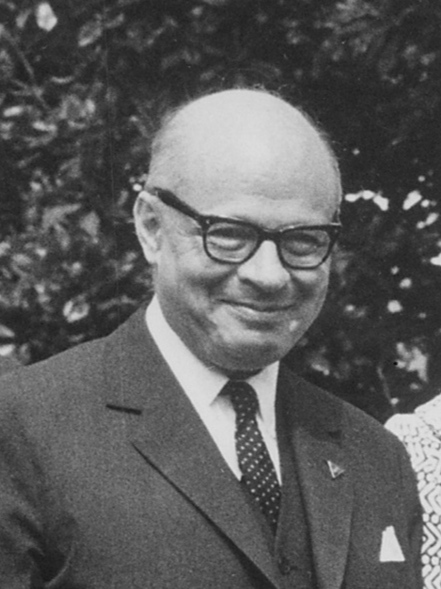

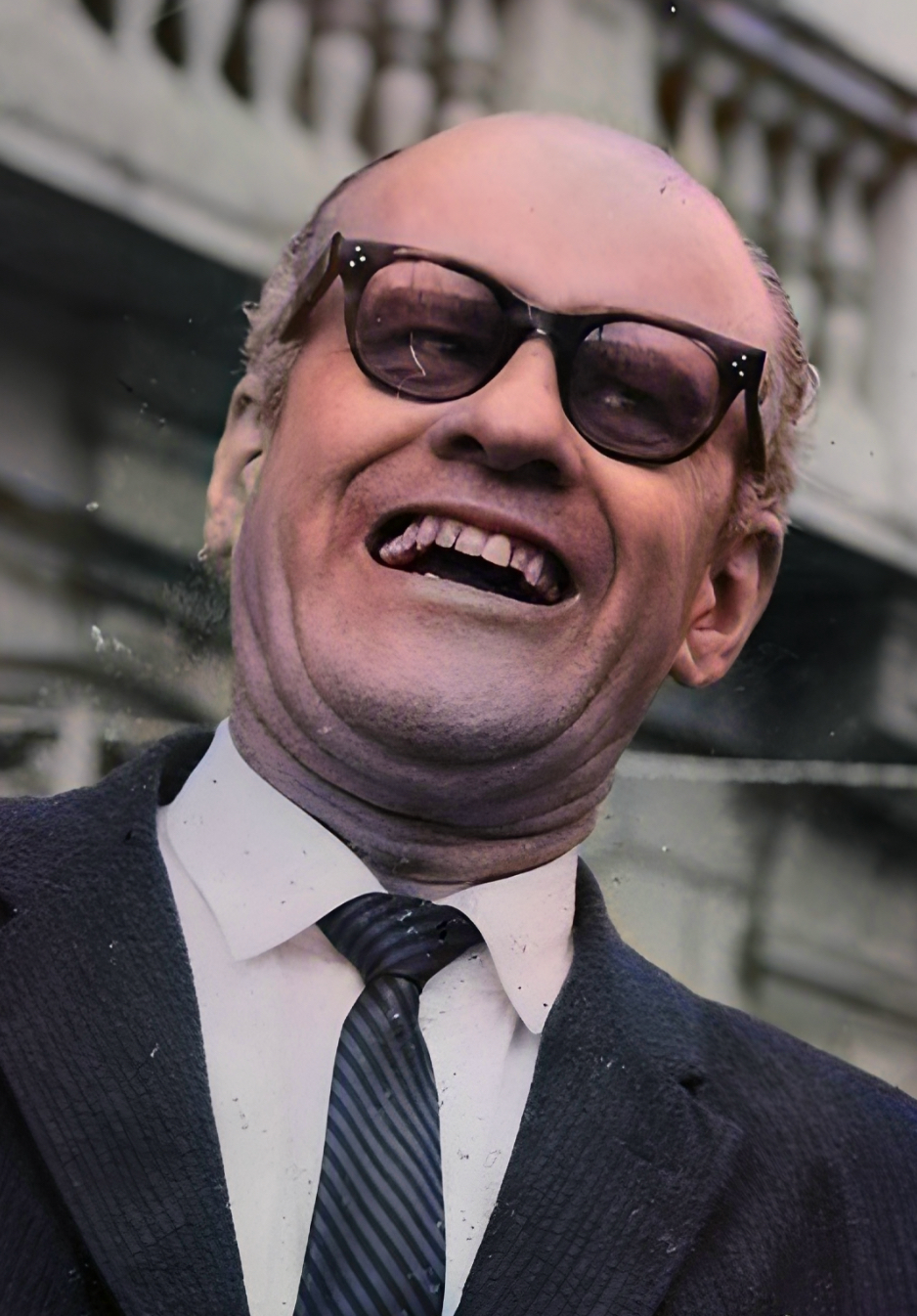
Nominee	Carlos Lleras Restrepo	José Jaramillo Giraldo
Party	Liberal	ANAPO
Alliance	National Front	—
Home state	Bogotá	Caldas
Popular vote	1,891,175	742,133
Percentage	71.80%	28.18%
- Winner by department
President before election
Guillermo León Valencia
Conservative
Elected President
Carlos Lleras Restrepo
Liberal

Presidential elections were held in Colombia on 1 May 1966. Under the National Front agreement, it was the turn of the Liberal Party to govern, and so all candidates were members of the party. The result was a victory for Carlos Lleras Restrepo, who received 71.8% of the vote.

== Results ==
Candidate	Party	Votes	%
Carlos Lleras Restrepo	Colombian Liberal Party	1,891,175	71.80
José Jaramillo Giraldo	National Popular Alliance	742,133	28.18
Antonio Goyeneche	Colombian Liberal Party	597	0.02
Total		2,633,905	100.00
Valid votes		2,633,905	99.42
Invalid/blank votes		15,353	0.58
Total votes		2,649,258	100.00
Registered voters/turnout		6,611,352	40.07
Source: Nohlen
