= León Mario Bedoya =

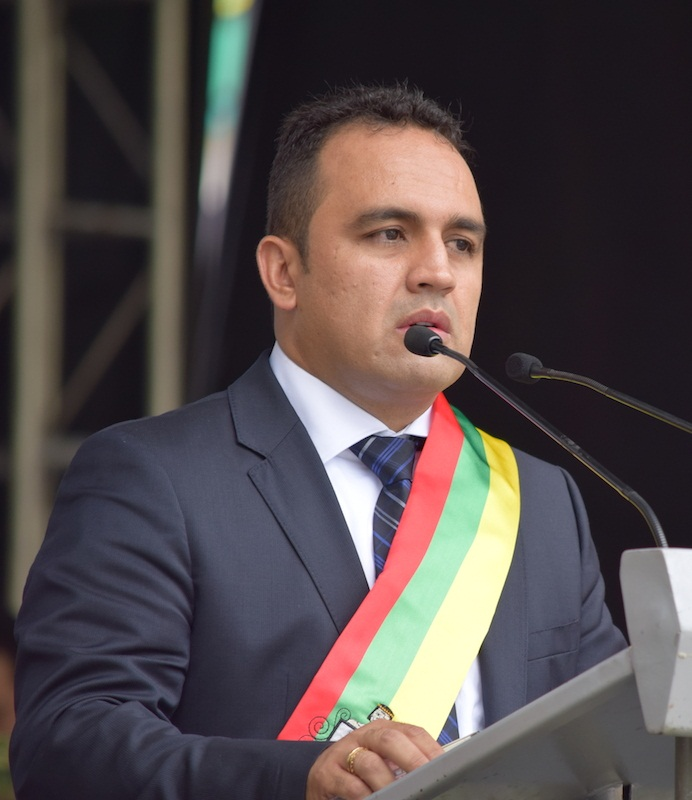
León Mario Bedoya

León Mario Bedoya López (Itagüí, April 28, 1973) is a Colombian lawyer, business administrator and politician.

== Biography ==
León Mario Bedoya is a lawyer and business administrator with a master's degree in Public Administration, Territorial Planning, and Population Dynamics from the Universidad Externado de Colombia. As a politician and public servant, he served as president of the Association of Municipalities of the Aburrá Valley, secretary of government, acting mayor, councilman, and president of the Council in Itagüí, as well as representative of councilors on the Metropolitan Area Board.

He ran for mayor of the municipality of Itagüí and participated in the 2015 regional elections in Colombia, where he ultimately won with 50.10% of the vote, equivalent to 57,510 votes. At that time, Bedoya López was affiliated with the Colombian Conservative Party.

During his tenure as mayor, he worked on social projects in the areas of health, education, and school infrastructure. The creation of child development centers (CDI) focused on minors and adolescents helped resolve conflicts and social problems in these communities. In total, 600 minors from rural and urban areas benefited from this project. Sixty-eight percent of the budget was allocated to the implementation and launch of various social programs targeting the most vulnerable communities, including the Comprehensive Mental Health Management program, which involved various entities and agencies such as the Colombian Institute of Family Welfare and family police stations, among others. At the end of his term, he negotiated an agreement with the Metropolitan Area and the Ministry of National Education in the amount of $45 billion for the construction of nine schools and several mobile classrooms, a project that benefited the student sector. Finally, he obtained an 83.06% approval rating during his term as mayor and ended with 95% compliance with his development plan.

In December 2016, Bedoya and several councilors were acquitted of their duties as administrators and officials of Itagüí. They were accused at the time of benefiting and enriching members of the National Police in the performance of their duties against organized crime, which would lead to financial loss. Both the mayor and the councilors filed an appeal through a legal team. Finally, the Colombian Council of State ruled in favor of Bedoya and the other councilors, arguing that there was no evidence of alleged incentives.

On September 24, 2018, the Colombian Press and Media Society awarded him the Carlos Lemos Simmonds Order, Extraordinary Grand Cross in the Degree of Knight, for his “contribution to transparency, democracy, and social development in the country”. On December 11, 2019, he was recognized as the country's best leader in road safety issues. He was also selected as one of the three best mayors in Colombia in issues related to overcoming poverty.

== Investigation ==
In mid-June 2023, Bedoya was investigated by the Attorney General's Office for the irregular appointment of an executive at the Sur Gabriel Jaramillo Hospital. The government agency noted at the time that there were irregularities in the hiring of Claudia Jimena Echavarría, head of internal control at the hospital, due to her possible lack of experience for the position in question.

In October 2023, the Attorney General's Office also investigated him for having benefited two people with property titles. Silvia Patricia Quintero Franco, who at that time was the municipal secretary of housing and habitat and responsible for the approval for the execution of the transfer, was also investigated.
