= List of First Lady of Colombia firsts =

This list enumerates the achievements and distinctions of various first ladies of Colombia, since its creation in 1934. It includes distinctions achieved in her previous life and subsequent service to the first lady.

There have been twenty official first ladies and only one of them has died in office.

== María Michelsen de López ==
- First born in Bogotá.
- First with Jewish ancestry.
- First first lady to preside at two non-consecutive administrations.
- First first lady to also be the mother of a president.

== Lorenza Villegas de Santos ==
- The first born in Risaralda.

== Bertha Hernández de Ospina ==
- First former first lady to be a congresswoman.

== María Hurtado de Gómez ==
- First first lady to not complete her term due to her husband's resignation.

== Carolina Correa Londoño ==
- First to become first lady by promotion to the presidency of her husband.
- First first lady granted a Colombian identity card.
- First first lady to vote.

== Bertha Puga de Lleras ==
- First first lady not to have been born in Colombia.
- First first lady to actively conduct politics.

== Susana López de Valencia ==
- First first lady to live in Casa de Nariño.
- First first lady to die in Casa de Nariño.
- First first lady to die in office.

== Cecilia de la Fuente de Lleras ==
- First first lady to be born in Spain.
- First first lady to receive the Order of Boyacá.

== María Cristina Arango de Pastrana ==
- First first lady to live to see a son become president.

== Cecilia Caballero Blanco ==
- First first Lady to receive the distinction of Lady Grand Cross of the Order of Isabella the Catholic.
- First First Lady to be declared Woman of the Year.
- First First Lady to reach 100 years.

== Nydia Quintero ==
- First first lady to divorce.
- First first lady to be born in Neiva, Tolima
- First first lady of Lebanese descent.

== Rosa Álvarez de Betancur ==
- First first lady to be born in Medellin.

== Carolina Isakson de Barco ==
- First first lady to be born in the United States.
- First first lady to be fluent in a Germanic language.
- First first lady to be a non-native speaker of Spanish.
- First first lady to graduate with a Bachelor of Arts.

== Ana Milena Muñoz de Gaviria ==
- First first lady to be born in Pereira.
- First first lady to be an Economist.

== Jacquin Strouss de Samper ==
- First first lady to be a historian.

== Nohra Puyana de Pastrana ==
- First first lady to have previously been first lady of Bogotá.
- First first lady to serve at the end of the century and at the beginning of another century.

== Lina Moreno de Uribe ==
- First first lady to serve two consecutive terms.
- First first lady to travel abroad under the figure of ambassador on mission.

== María Clemencia de Santos ==
- First first lady to be born in Bucaramanga
- First first lady to have been private secretary of the ministry of telecommunications.

== María Juliana Ruiz ==
- First first lady to have a master's degree in law.

== Verónica Alcocer ==
- First first lady to be born in Sucre.
- First first lady to be married to a divorcé.
- First first lady to attend the Carnival of Barranquilla
- First first lady in office to attend Congress.
- First First Lady to attend the state funeral of a British monarch
- First First Lady to attend the funeral of a Prime Minister of Japan
- First first lady to attend an audience with the pope alone.
- First First Lady to attend a coronation of a British monarch.

== See also ==
- List of first ladies of Colombia
