= Ana Lucía Pineda =

First Lady of Colombia since 2026

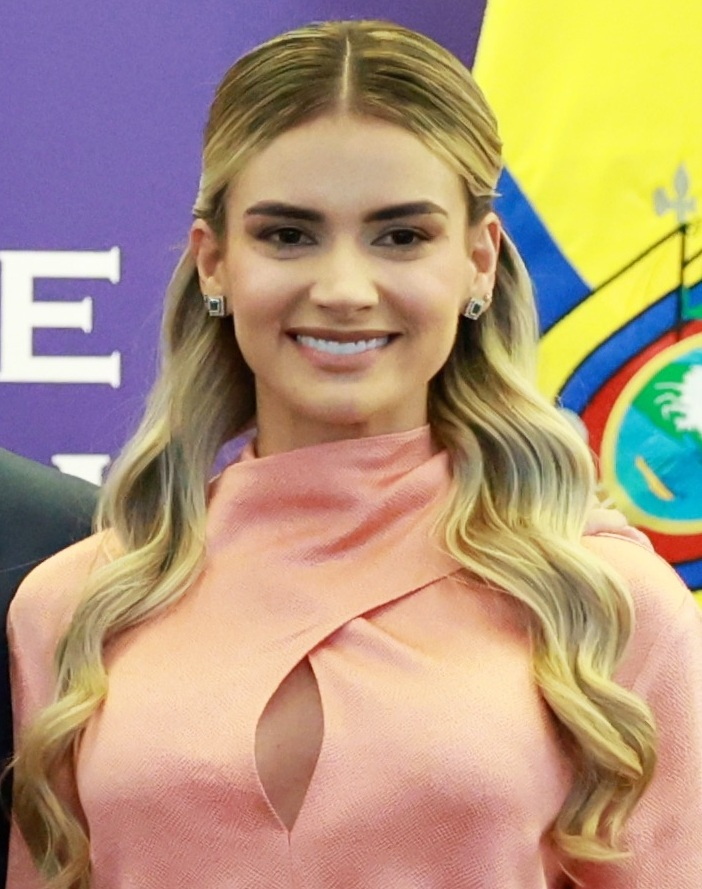
- Ana Lucia Pineda in 2026

First Lady of Colombia
- Assumed role 7 August 2026
- President: Abelardo de la Espriella
- Preceded by: Verónica Alcocer

Personal details
- Born: Ana Lucía Pineda Aruachan; 8 October 1987 (age 39) Montería, Córdoba, Colombia
- Party: Defenders of the Homeland
- Spouse: Abelardo de la Espriella (m. 2008)
- Children: 4
- Parents: Gabriel Pineda; Regina Aruachan
- Education: Pontificia Universidad Javeriana (BBA)

Ana Lucía Pineda Aruachan (born 8 October 1987) is a Colombian businesswoman and the first lady of Colombia since 2026 as the second wife of Abelardo de la Espriella, the 36th President of Colombia.

Born in Montería, Córdoba, she studied at the British School of Montería where she completed high school, later she began studies at the Pontificia Universidad Javeriana where she studied Business Administration.

== Early life, education, career and family ==
Ana Lucía Pineda Aruachan was born on 8 October 1987 in Montería, Córdoba. Her father, Gabriel Pineda, served as the livestock technical secretary at Colombian Federation of Cattle Ranchers. Her mother, Regina Aruachan, served as the consul general in Miami under the Duque administration. Ana Lucía has a twin sister, María Victoria, as well as an older brother, José Gabriel, and an older sister, Lilian.

The family enjoyed a comfortable economic position in Montería. As a child, she attended the British School of Montería, as did her siblings, where she completed high school, excelling in mathematics. After graduating at seventeen, Ana Lucía enrolled in the Faculty of Economic and Administrative Sciences at the Pontificia Universidad Javeriana in Bogotá, D.C., from which she finally graduated c. 2006 and 2007.

Pineda met De La Espriella when she was 5 and Abelardo was 15. They met again 14 years later, when she was 18 and De la Espriella 29, in a meeting arranged by their families. Pineda began a relationship with De La Espriella in 2005. They married on December 13, 2008, at the San Pedro Claver Church in Cartagena.

In 2011, Ana Lucía and Abelardo had a daughter, Lucía de la Espriella. Ana Lucía chose her name in her honor. After Lucía's birth, Ana Lucía had Salvador, followed approximately three years later by Filippo, and in 2023, her youngest daughter, Francesca.

== First Lady of Colombia (2026-present) ==
Ana Lucía is the sixth youngest first lady of Colombia after Ana Milena Muñoz de Gaviria.

=== Official duties ===
During the initial days of her term as first lady, Ana Lucía traveled with President de la Espriella to Cali, Valle del Cauca, following the serious damage caused by the 2026 Colombia earthquake, from where she led the reconstruction of the affected areas.

Honorary titles
Preceded by Verónica Alcocer	First Lady of Colombia; 2026–present	Current holder
