= Pedro Felipe Valencia López =

Colombian agronomist

Colombia Ambassador to Japan
- President: Ernesto Samper Pizano
- Preceded by: Rodrigo Villamizar Alvargonzález
- Succeeded by: Carlos Ricardo Gutiérrez Correa

Personal details
- Born: 5 June 1931 Popayán, Cauca, Colombia
- Died: 25 August 2000 (aged 69) Bogotá, D.C., Colombia
- Party: Conservative
- Spouse: Una Eileen Barron
- Children: Susana Lucía Valencia Barron; Guillermo Felipe Valencia Barron; Natalia Valencia Barron
- Parents: Guillermo León Valencia Muñoz; Susana López Navia
- Education: Royal Agricultural College (BSc, 1955)
- Profession: Agronomist

Pedro Felipe Valencia López (5 June 1931 – 25 August 2000) was a Colombian politician. A Conservative party politician, he was the son of Guillermo León Valencia Muñóz who was President of Colombia between 1962 and 1966. As a diplomat he served as Ambassador of Colombia to Japan, First Secretary of Colombia in Brussels, Counsellor and Chargé d'Affaires in London, and Delegate of the Federación Nacional de Cafeteros de Colombia to Spain and Portugal.
