= Acting President of Colombia =

Person acting as Colombian president when the office holder is incapacitated

An acting president of Colombia is a person who lawfully exercises the powers and duties of the President of Colombia even though that person does not hold office in his own right. There is an established line of presidential succession in which officials of the Colombian national government can be called upon to assume presidential responsibilities if the main president becomes incapacitated, dies, resigns, is removed from office (by Impeachment by accusation by the Supreme Court of Justice) during his four-year term, or if a president-elect has not been elected by Inauguration Day or has not qualified by that date.

The vice president immediately assumes the presidency upon the death, resignation, or removal of the president from office. Similarly, if a president-elect died during the transition period, or declined to serve, the vice president-elect would become president on Inauguration Day. A vice president can also become acting president if the president becomes incapacitated. If the presidency and vice presidency were simultaneously vacant, the eventual successor will not become president, but only will be in charge. Since 1886 to date, nineteen people, including three vice presidents and sixteen designates have served as acting president.

Vice presidents and designates who served as acting president
Acting President	Beginning	End	President	Reason
José María Campo	7 August 1886	7 January 1887	Rafael Núñez	Disease
Eliseo Payán	5 January 1887	4 June 1887	Rafael Núñez	Disease
Eliseo Payán	12 December 1887	8 February 1888	Rafael Núñez	Disease
Carlos Holguín Mallarino	7 August 1888	7 August 1892	Rafael Núñez	Disease
Miguel Antonio Caro	7 August 1892	7 August 1898	Rafael Núñez	Disease
Antonio Basilio Cuervo	16 January 1893	17 January 1893	Miguel Antonio Caro	Temporary absence
Guillermo Quintero Calderón	12 March 1896	17 March 1896	Miguel Antonio Caro	Temporary absence
Euclídes de Angulo	9 March 1908	14 April 1908	Rafael Reyes	Temporary absence
Jorge Holguín	9 June 1909	4 August 1909	Rafael Reyes	Resignation
Ramón González Valencia	4 August 1909	7 August 1910	Rafael Reyes	Resignation
Jorge Holguín	11 November 1921	7 August 1922	Marco Fidel Suárez	Resignation
Carlos Lozano	9 October 1942	19 October 1942	Alfonso López Pumarejo	Temporary absence
Darío Echandía	19 October 1943	16 May 1944	Alfonso López Pumarejo	Temporary absence
Alberto Lleras Camargo	7 August 1945	7 August 1946	Alfonso López Pumarejo	Resignation
Roberto Urdaneta Arbeláez	5 November 1951	13 June 1953	Laureano Gómez	Disease
Gabriel París Gordillo	30 July 1955	3 August 1955	Gustavo Rojas Pinilla	Temporary absence
José Antonio Montalvo	6 August 1963	8 August 1963	Guillermo León Valencia	Temporary absence
Rafael Azuero Manchola	21 July 1973	24 July 1973	Misael Pastrana	Temporary absence
Indalecio Liévano	20 September 1975	24 September 1975	Alfonso López Michelsen	Temporary absence
Víctor Mosquera Chaux	3 February 1981	11 February 1981	Julio César Turbay	Temporary absence
Carlos Lemos Simmonds	14 January 1998	24 January 1998	Ernesto Samper	Disease

== See also ==
- Colombian presidential line of succession
