= Pontifical Bolivarian University =

Private university in Colombia

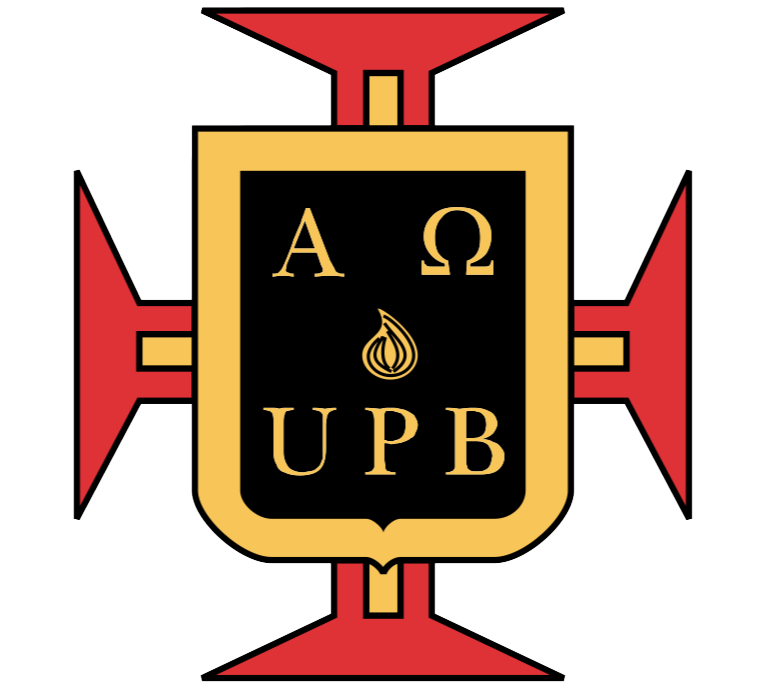
- Other names: UPB
- Motto: Formación integral para la transformación social y humana
- Motto in English: Integral education for social and human transformation
- Type: Private
- Established: 1936
- Religious affiliation: Catholic Church
- Academic affiliations: 1. International Federation of Catholic Universities.; 2. Post-grad Iberoamerican Association of Universities.; 3. Colombian Association of Universities.; 4. Universia.
- Students: 26,000
- Location: 6°14′32.82″N 75°35′23.4″W
- Campus: Campuses in: 1. Medellín, (Main Campus and School of Medicine); 2. Bucaramanga; 3. Montería; 4. Palmira; 5. Bogotá
- Colors: Red and black
- Website: www.upb.edu.co
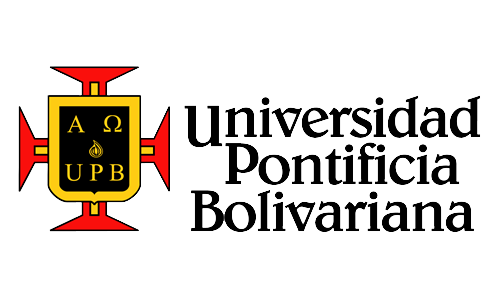

The Pontifical Bolivarian University (Spanish: Universidad Pontificia Bolivariana), also referred to as UPB, is a private university in Colombia with its main campus in Medellín, where it was founded in 1936. As of 2023, the university is ranked among the top four universities in Colombia and among the top 30 universities in Latin America by QS World University Rankings. In addition to its main campus in Medellín, the university has campuses in Bogotá, Bucaramanga, Montería and Palmira. As of 2021, the university had an estimated 26,000 students.

The university offers 74 undergraduate programs, 68 master programs, and ten doctorate programs. The university groups its educational programs under the schools of Architecture And Urbanism, Design, Engineering, Health Sciences, Law and Political Sciences, Strategic Sciences (Management), Social Sciences, Education and Teaching, and Theology, Philosophy and Humanities. The university also operates elementary and high school programs under its educational umbrella.

The university has several distinguished alumni such as former President of Colombia Belisario Betancur Cuartas, and former First Lady of Colombia Lina María Moreno Mejía.

== History ==
The façade of the chapel at the university's main entrance showing the seal of the university

The university was founded on September 15, 1936, by a decree of the Catholic Archbishop of Medellín, Monsignor Tiberio de Jesús Salazar y Herrera as the Universidad Católica Bolivariana (UCB, Catholic Bolivarian University). The UCB started with a small faculty and 78 students enrolled in the School of Law and with Monsignor Manuel José Sierra as its first rector. In 1945, the university received the title of Pontifical, from the Holy See under Pope Pius XII. With the right to use the title of Pontifical, the Pope became the Grand Chancellor of the university.

From the university's onset, Monsignor Manuel José Sierra wanted to anchor the university on the ideals of Christian humanism and those of the Simón Bolívar.

== Academics ==
A Greek alphabet mural by Pablo Jaramillo in the School of Engineering

The university has programs that extend from elementary and high school to undergraduate and postgraduate programs The UPB 74 undergraduate programs, 68 master programs and 10 doctorate programs nationwide :

Undergraduate Schools and Programs
School of Architecture and Design	School of Health Sciences	School of Strategic Sciences	School of Social Sciences	School of Law and Political Sciences	School of Education	School of Engineering	School of Theology, Philosophy and Humanities
Architecture and Urbanism; Graphic Design; Industrial Design; Fashion and Clothing Design	Medicine; Nursing	Corporate Management; International Business Management; Economics	Social Communication and Journalism; Advertising; Psychology; Social Work	Law; Political Science	Education in Arts; Etnoeducation; English-Spanish	Electrical Engineering; Electronics Engineering; Mechanical Engineering; Chemical Engineering; Aeronautical Engineering; Industrial Engineering	Literature; History; Philosophy; Theology; Religious Education

== Academic and geographical organization ==
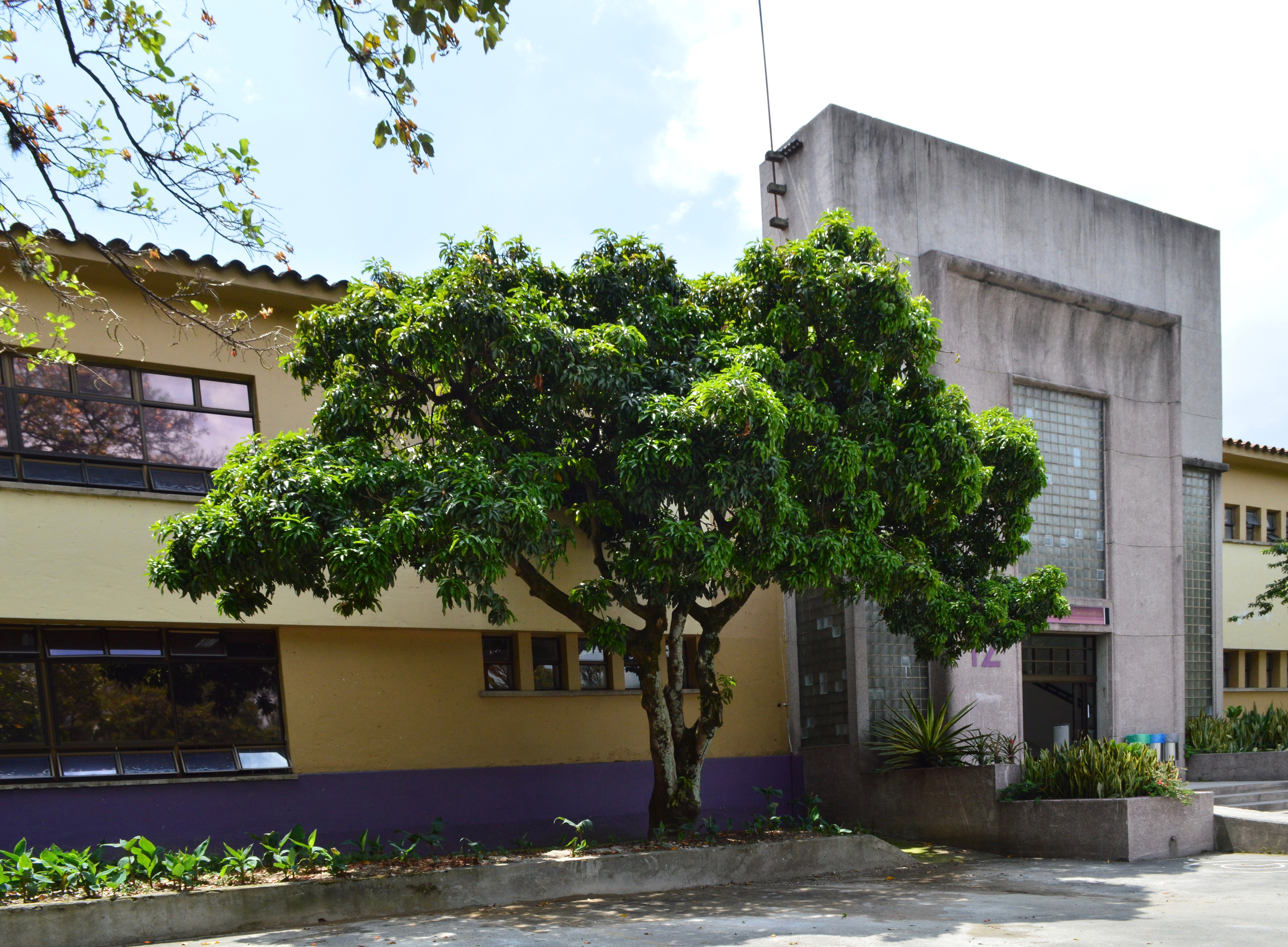
The School of Law and Political Sciences, founded in 1936, is the oldest in the university.

The university's organization is based on different types of academic units, namely:

- School: includes one or several faculties or academic programs in the same area of knowledge.
- Faculty: offers one or several curricula of professional formation.
- Program: academic plan that provides either basic, professional, complementary or higher education.
- Institute: academic unit that advances knowledge in an area through academic services, academic extension and/or research.
- Center: provides academic services within or outside the university.

The university is made up of 8 Schools (main campus), 19 centers, foundations and institutes (Medellín) and in its satellite campuses, 13 centers, foundations and institutes. The university offers 42 undergraduate programs and 156 graduate programs: 11 doctoral programs, 48 master programs and 97 specializations.

Schools and Faculties
Medellín (main campus)	Bucaramanga	Montería	Palmira
School of Architecture and Design.; School of Social Sciences; School of Health Sciences and Medicine; School of Law and Political Sciences; School of Economics, Administration and Business; School of Education; School of Engineering; School of Theology, Philosophy and Humanities	School of Social Sciences; School of Economics, Administration and Business; School of Law and Political Sciences; School of Engineering	School of Social and Human Sciences; School of Architecture and Engineering; School of Economics, Administration and Business; School of Law	School of Social Sciences; School of Economics, Administration and Business; School of Law and Political Sciences; School of Engineering

== Research ==
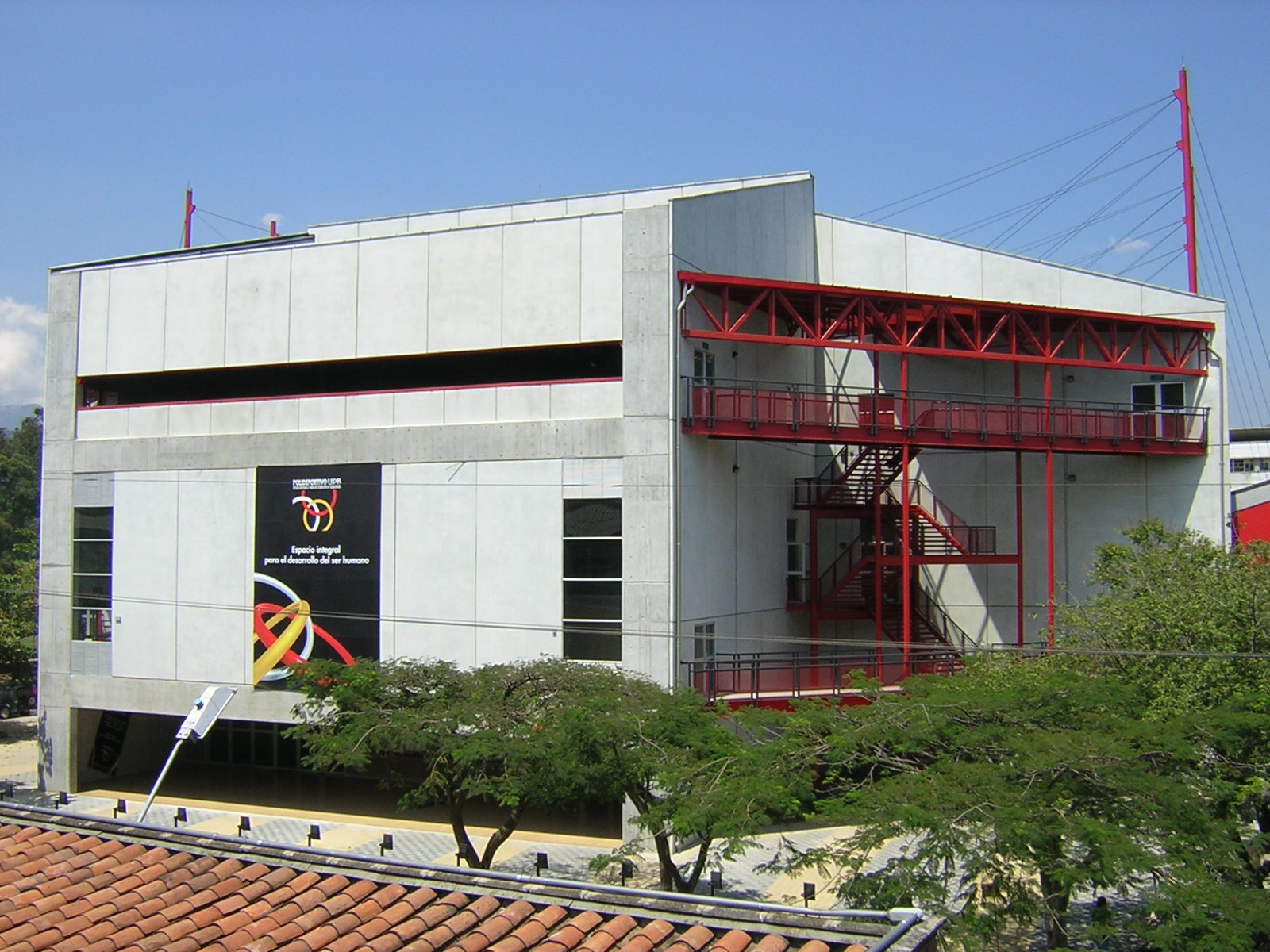
Polideportivo main campus in Medellín

As of 2021, the university had 315 docent researchers working within 91 research groups across Colombia. which were coordinated by the Integrated Center for the Development of Research (CIDI from its initials in Spanish). The CIDI seeks to maintain a close and dynamic relationship between industry and academia through technology transfer and consulting services. The research groups are based in different campuses with the majority of them in Medellín. The research groups concentrate their efforts in the areas of Health Sciences, Social Sciences and Engineering.

== Campuses ==
=== Main campus ===
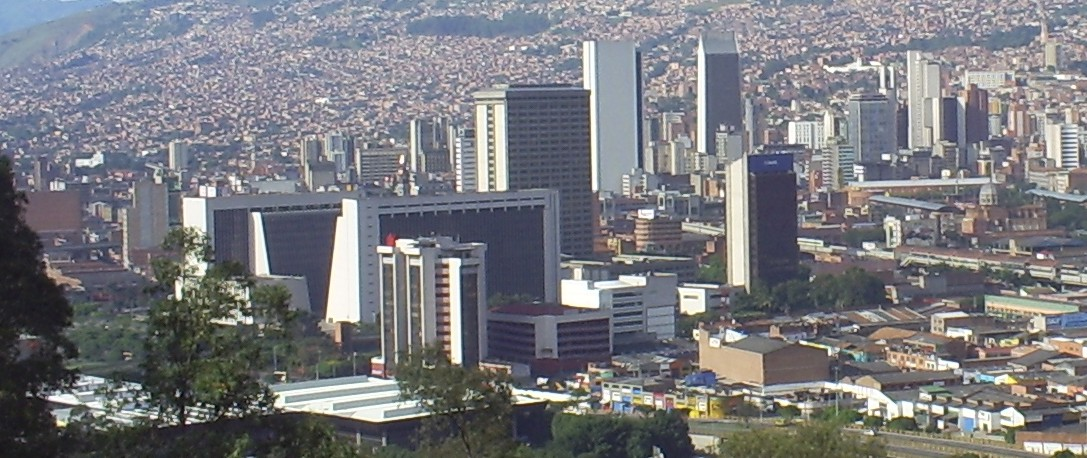
Medellín, the location of the university's main campus

The main campus is located in Medellín and houses the main chapel, student health services, the main library and the schools of Engineering, Social Sciences, Architecture, and Languages as well as schools for primary and secondary education.

=== Bucaramanga ===
The Bucaramanga campus opened on July 12, 1991, in the Archdiocesan Seminary. In 1998, UPB established its own home on the Piedecuesta Highway, 7 kilometers away from the city. The estimated UPB Bucaramanga student population in 2013 was 5,800 students.

The UPB Bucaramanga campus houses the following schools:

Strategic Sciences' School

- Business administration
- International business management

Social Sciences' School

- Social communication and journalism
- Psychology

Law and Political Science's School

- Law

Engineering's School

- Electronic engineering
- Computer engineering
- Industrial engineering
- Mechanical engineering
- Civil engineering
- Environmental engineering

=== Montería ===
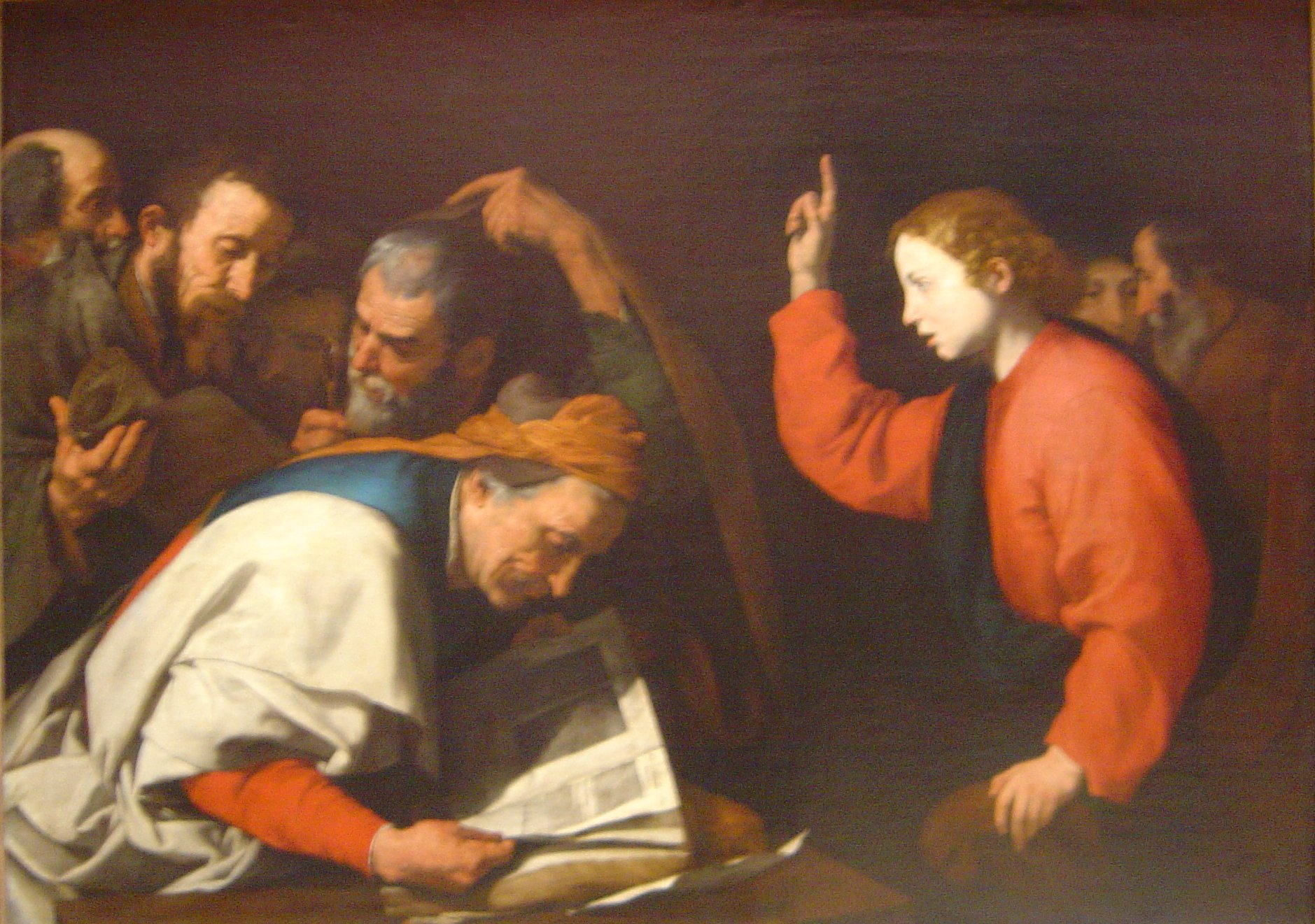
Jesus, the center of the university and the teacher of faith

The university opened its campus in Montería on May 25, 1995. The campus established the university's presence in Colombia's Atlantic region with academic programs in law, management, journalism, engineering, informatics, electronics, mechanical, agroindustrial, environmental management and several graduate programs. The campus is estimated to have 2,028 students.

=== Palmira ===
The university established its presence in the coffee region of the country through its Palmira campus. The university opened the campus in 2001 with programs such as Psychology, Marketing, Human Resources, Management, and Economics. The university currently has 218 students and it is the newest campus of the university in Colombia.

== Affiliations ==
UPB is member of different international associations and programs. It is also a chair of UNESCO on Human Development and a member of the Foundation for Studies in France. It belongs also to the Sígueme Program a group that gathered 10 Colombian universities. UPB has agreements with universities in Germany, Argentina, Brazil, Canada, Chile, Spain, France, United Kingdom, Netherlands, Mexico, Peru, Uruguay, United States, Colombia, Cuba and Venezuela.

== Libraries ==
UPB has a complete system of documentation and bibliography, with the central library residing in a dedicated four-story building. Every school at UPB has its own library interconnected with the Central one.

== Gallery ==
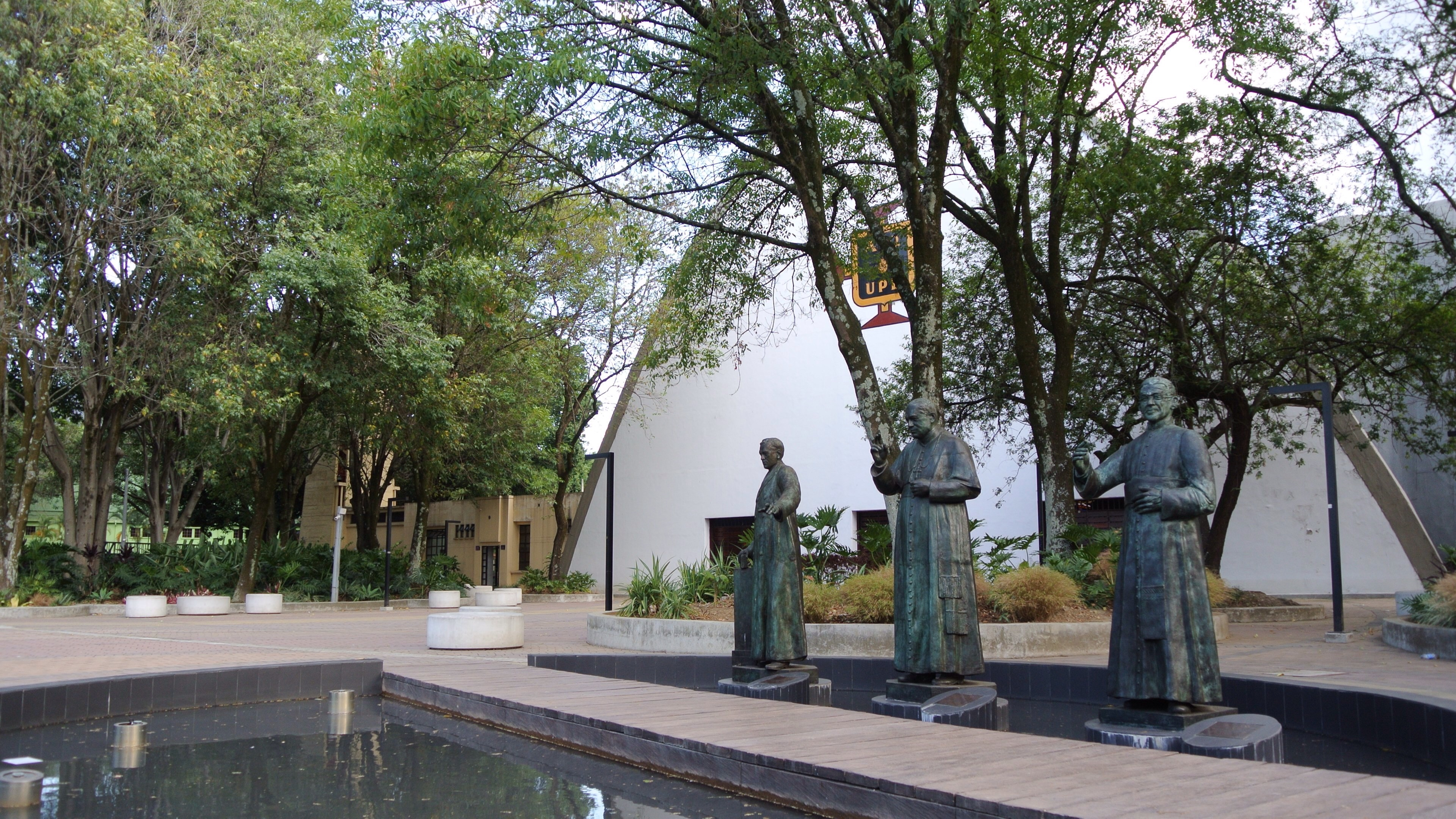
Founders' Plaza

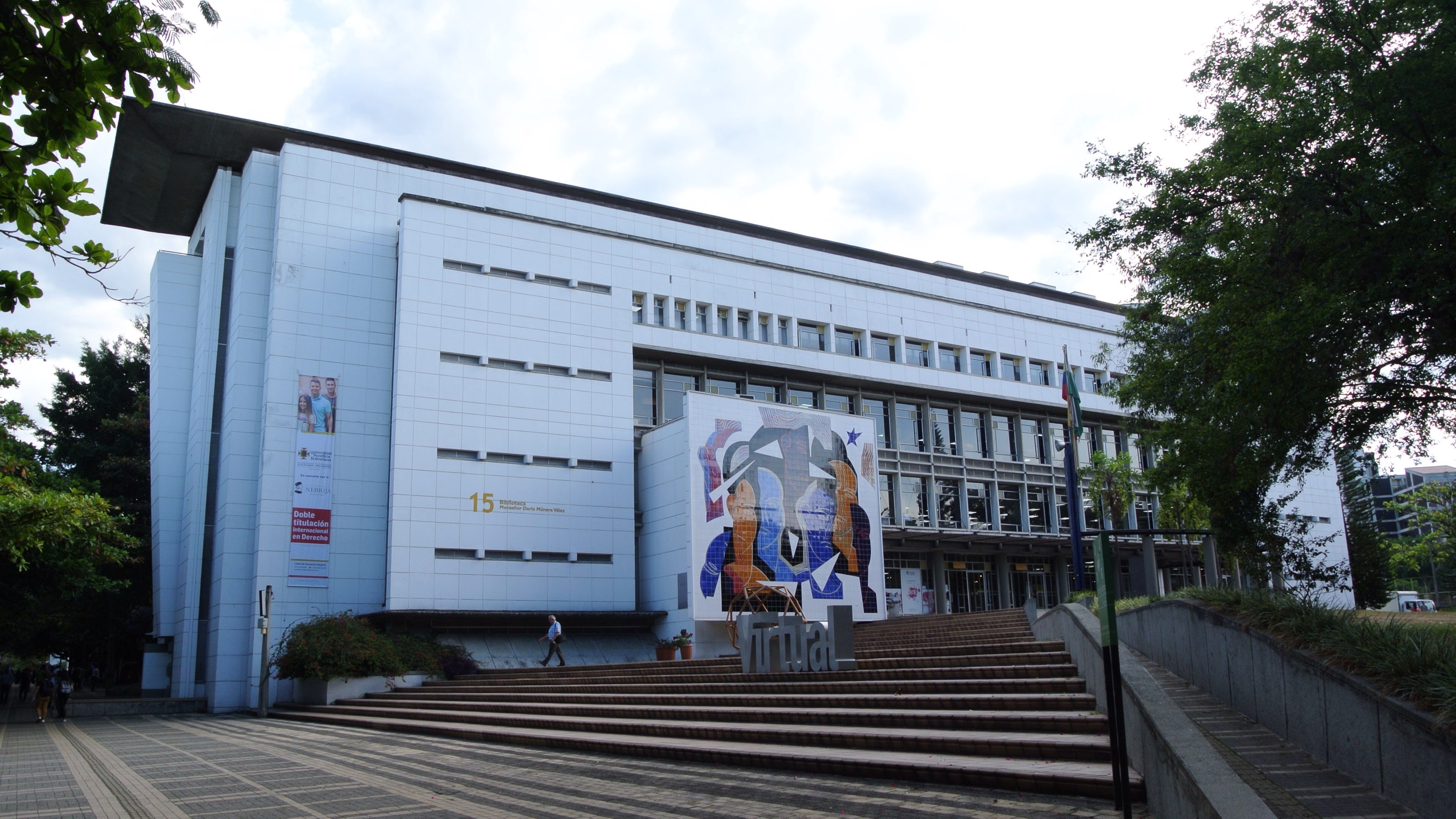
Central Library

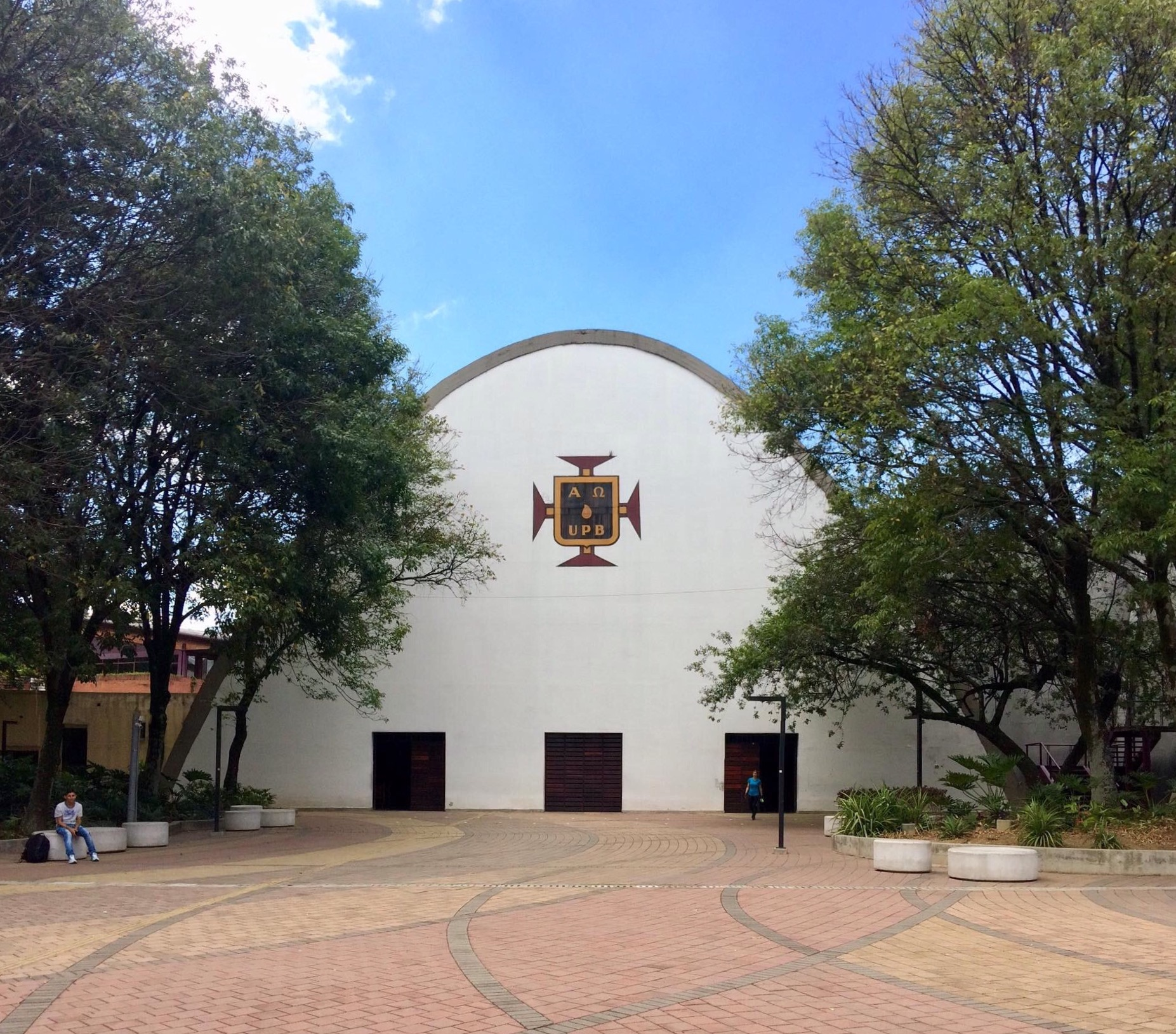
The church at the main entrance to the Medellín Campus on 70th Avenue

== See also ==
- List of universities in Colombia
- Pontifical university
