= Susana López de Valencia =

First Lady of Colombia from 1962 to 1964

First Lady of Colombia
- In role August 7, 1962 – May 19, 1964
- President: Guillermo León Valencia
- Preceded by: Bertha Puga de Lleras
- Succeeded by: Cecilia de la Fuente de Lleras

Personal details
- Born: Susana López Navia; September 17, 1910 Palmira, Cauca Valley, Colombia
- Died: May 19, 1964 (aged 53) Bogotá, D.C., Colombia
- Party: Conservative
- Spouse: Guillermo León Valencia (1931—1964)
- Children: Pedro Felipe Valencia López; Halma Valencia López; Ignacio Valencia López; Diana Valencia López

Susana López de Valencia (née López Navia; 17 September 1910 – 19 May 1964) was the first lady of Colombia from 1962 to 1964. As the wife of the 21st President Guillermo León Valencia. López de Valencia has been to date the only First Lady to die in office.

== Personal life ==
Susana López Navia was born on 17 September 1910 in Palmira, Valle del Cauca to Gustavo López Terreros and Lucrecia Navia Carvajal. She married Guillermo León Valencia on 31 January 1931. They had four children together: Pedro Felipe, Alma, Ignacio, and Diana.

In 1958, López, who had been diagnosed with hypertension, suffered a stroke that left her with hemiplegia and using a wheelchair.

López died on 19 May 1964 at the Casa de Nariño in Bogotá, D.C. of a pulmonary embolism brought on by her condition. She was the first spouse of a Colombian president to die while her husband was still in office.

Honorary titles
Preceded by Bertha Puga de Lleras	First Lady of Colombia; 1962–1964	Succeeded by Cecilia de la Fuente de Lleras
