= Bertha Hernández de Ospina =

Colombian politician (1907–1993)

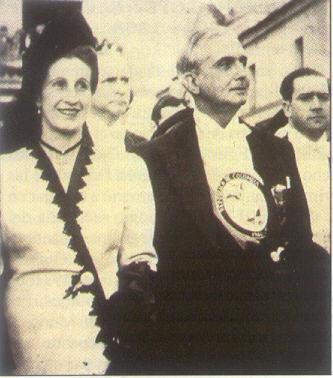
- Bertha with Mariano Ospina Pérez during the inauguration on 7 August 1946

Senator of Colombia
- In office 20 July 1970 – 20 July 1974

First Lady of Colombia
- In role 7 August 1946 – 7 August 1950
- President: Mariano Ospina Pérez
- Preceded by: Bertha Puga de Lleras
- Succeeded by: María Hurtado de Gómez

Personal details
- Born: Bertha Hernández Fernández; 17 April 1907 Medellín, Antioquia, Colombia
- Died: 11 September 1993 (aged 86) Fusagasugá, Cundinamarca, Colombia
- Party: Conservative
- Spouse: Mariano Ospina Pérez (m. 1946; died 1976)
- Children: Mariano; Rodrigo; Fernando; Gonzalo; María Clara

Bertha Hernández de Ospina (née Hernández Fernández; 17 April 1907 – 11 September 1993) was a Colombian politician, writer, columnist, and civil leader for women's rights. She served as First Lady of Colombia from 1946 to 1950 as the wife of President Mariano Ospina Pérez and later as Senator of Colombia from 1970 to 1974.

Hernández de Ospina is the second most influential first lady in Colombian political life after Soledad Román de Núñez (wife of Rafael Núñez). Bertha was also one of the members of the Colombian suffrage movement founded in 1954, alongside prominent figures like Josefina Valencia (First woman Minister of Colombia) and Esmeralda Arboleda (First woman congresswoman of Colombia).

== Personal life ==
Bertha Hernández Fernández was born on 17 April 1907 in Medellín, Antioquia, to Antonio María Hernández Suárez and Mercedes Fernández Echavarría. She married Mariano Ospina Pérez on 18 July 1926 at the Christian Brothers Chapel in Medellín. Together, they had five children: Mariano, Rodrigo, Fernando, Gonzalo, and María Clara.

Honorary titles
Preceded by Bertha Puga de Lleras	First Lady of Colombia; 1946-1950	Succeeded by María Hurtado de Gómez
