= Darío Echandía =

Colombian politician

2nd Colombia Ambassador to the United Kingdom
- In office December 10, 1945 – August 20, 1946
- President: Alfonso López Pumarejo
- Preceded by: Jaime Jaramillo Arango
- Succeeded by: Domingo Esguerra Plata

Presidential Designate
- In office August 20, 1958 – August 31, 1960
- President: Alberto Lleras Camargo
- Preceded by: Gabriel París Gordillo
- Succeeded by: Carlos Lleras Restrepo
- In office August 5, 1943 – July 27, 1945
- President: Alfonso López Pumarejo
- Preceded by: Carlos Lozano y Lozano
- Succeeded by: Alberto Lleras Camargo

Minister of Justice
- In office March 27, 1967 – April 19, 1968
- President: Carlos Lleras Restrepo
- Preceded by: Hernán Salamanca Medina
- Succeeded by: Fernando Hinestrosa Forero

Governor of Tolima
- In office 1958–1959
- Preceded by: Manuel Antonio Coronado González
- Succeeded by: Rafael Parga Cortés

Minister of Government
- In office April 10, 1948 – May 21, 1949
- President: Mariano Ospina Pérez
- Preceded by: Eduardo Zuleta Ángel
- Succeeded by: Regulo Gaitan Patiño
- In office August 7, 1942 – October 8, 1943
- President: Alfonso López Pumarejo
- Preceded by: Luis Tamayo
- Succeeded by: Alberto Lleras Camargo
- In office August 13, 1934 – October 7, 1935
- President: Alfonso López Pumarejo
- Preceded by: Luis Cano
- Succeeded by: Alberto Lleras Camargo

Colombia Ambassador to the Holy See
- In office 1968–1973
- President: Carlos Lleras Restrepo
- Preceded by: José Antonio Montalvo Berbeo
- Succeeded by: Antonio Rocha Alvira

Colombia Ambassador to the Holy See
- In office 1937–1942
- President: Alfonso López Pumarejo (1937-1938); Eduardo Santos (1938-1942)
- Preceded by: Enrique Olaya Herrera

Minister of Foreign Affairs
- In office June 30, 1944 – February 12, 1945; Acting President:May 16 - July 10, 1994
- President: Alfonso López Pumarejo
- Preceded by: Carlos Lozano y Lozano
- Succeeded by: Alberto Lleras Camargo

Personal details
- Born: October 13, 1897 Chaparral, Tolima, Colombia
- Died: May 7, 1989 (aged 91) Ibagué, Tolima, Colombia
- Party: Liberal
- Spouse: Emilia Arciniegas Castilla (1936-1973)
- Education: Our Lady of the Rosary University
- Profession: Lawyer

Darío Echandía Olaya (October 13, 1897 – May 7, 1989) was a lawyer and a Colombian political figure, a member of the Colombian Liberal Party. He was born on October 13, 1897, in Chaparral, Tolima, son of Vincente Enchandia and Carlota Olaya de E. The elder of seven brothers, he was educated at Colegio Mayor de Nuestra Senora del Rosario and Colegio de Araujo (Bogota) receiving degrees of Attorney and Doctor in Law, 1917. He married Emilia Arciniegas, August 2, 1936. He died on May 7, 1989, in Ibagué, Tolima.

During his lifetime, Darío Echandía served as deputy for Tolima, senator for Tolima, president of the senate, magistrate in the Supreme Court of Justice, and in the ministries of Government, Education, Justice and Foreign Relations. He was also the Colombian ambassador to London and to the Holy See.

Darío Echandía was designated as acting president of Colombia on four occasions: From 1943 to 1944 due to the temporary absence of Alfonso López Pumarejo, in 1944 due to a kidnapping attempt against Pumarejo, briefly in 1960, and briefly in 1967.

The Darío Echandía Library (Biblioteca Darío Echandía) in Ibagué was inaugurated in 1984 in his honor.
