= Bertha Puga de Lleras =

First Lady of Colombia (1945–1946, 1958–1962)

First Lady of Colombia
- In role 7 August 1958 – 7 August 1962
- President: Alberto Lleras Camargo
- Preceded by: Carola Correa de Rojas Pinilla
- Succeeded by: Susana López de Valencia
- In role 7 August 1945 – 7 August 1946
- President: Alberto Lleras Camargo
- Preceded by: María Michelsen de López
- Succeeded by: Bertha Hernández de Ospina

Personal details
- Born: Bertha Puga Martínez; 13 March 1909 Temuco, Cautín Province, Chile
- Died: 9 August 2007 (aged 98) Bogotá, D.C., Colombia
- Citizenship: Colombian
- Party: Liberal
- Spouse: Alberto Lleras Camargo (m. 1931; died 1990)
- Children: Consuelo; Alberto; Ximena; Marcela
- Parent: Arturo Puga Osorio (father)

Bertha Puga Martínez de Lleras (13 March 1909 – 9 August 2007) was the first lady of Colombia from 1945 to 1946 and again from 1958 until 1962, as the wife of President Alberto Lleras Camargo. She was the third person to serve in this role during two nonconsecutive terms after María Michelsen de López, and the first naturalized citizen to become first lady.

Puga de Lleras met Alberto in late 1929 in Bogotá while her father Arturo Puga Osorio was Chilean ambassador to Colombia. She married Alberto Lleras Camargo in 1931. The Lleras family lived a private life before Alberto's first election as president in 1945 and his reelection in 1958.

== Personal life ==
She moved to Colombia with her family when her father was named Ambassador of Chile to Colombia, and it was then that she met her future husband Alberto Lleras Camargo, whom she married on 10 August 1931. Alberto and Bertha had four children: Consuelo, Alberto, Ximena, and Marcela. Bertha died on 9 August 2007 at the age of 98.

Honorary titles
Preceded by María Michelsen de López	First Lady of Colombia; 1945–1946	Succeeded by Bertha Hernández de Ospina
Preceded by Carolina Correa Londoño	First Lady of Colombia; 1958–1962	Succeeded by Susana López de Valencia
