= María Clemencia de Santos =

First Lady of Colombia from 2010 to 2018

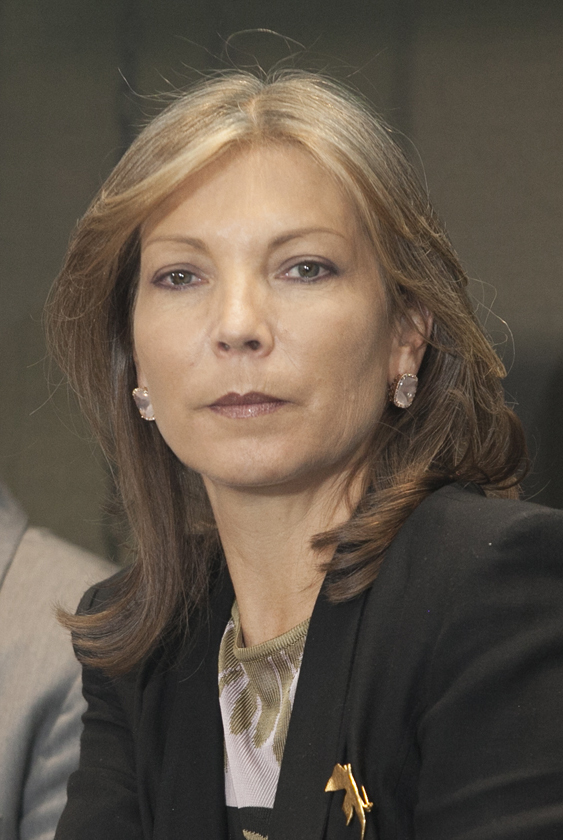
- Rodríguez de Santos in January 2014

First Lady of Colombia
- In role 7 August 2010 – 7 August 2018
- President: Juan Manuel Santos
- Preceded by: Lina Moreno de Uribe
- Succeeded by: María Juliana Ruiz

Personal details
- Born: María Clemencia Rodríguez Múnera; 28 December 1955 (age 70) Bucaramanga, Santander, Colombia
- Party: Union Party for the People
- Spouses: Christian Toro Ibler (m. 1982; div. 1985); Juan Manuel Santos (m. 1987)
- Children: 3
- Relatives: Santos family
- Profession: Graphic Designer

María Clemencia "Tutina" Rodríguez de Santos (née Rodríguez Múnera, 13 November 1955) is a Colombian graphic designer who served as first lady of Colombia from 2010 to 2018 as the wife of President Juan Manuel Santos. Rodríguez de Santos is the second first lady to serve two consecutive terms after Lina Moreno de Uribe.

Rodríguez de Santos -or also "Tutina" as she is affectionately known-, was characterized by her glamour, sobriety and elegance; being one of the most influential fashion icons in Colombia. During her eight years as the first lady, she made numerous trips humanitarian throughout Colombia.

== Personal life ==
María Clemencia de Santos was born on 13 November 1955 in Bucaramanga, Santander to Jorge Rodríguez Rodríguez and his wife Cecilia Múnera Cambas. She is the sixth of eight children.

In 1982 she married Christian Toro Ibler, a respected and well known Colombian publicist. The Roman Catholic ceremony took place at the Church of Our Lady of the Waters in Bogotá, and was officiated by Fr Jesús Adán Londoño Rodas. It was attended by, among others, the then-President Belisario Betancur Cuartas and First Lady Rosa Helena Álvarez Yepes who were not only the guests of honour, but also the godparents of the couple for the ceremony. The couple divorced shortly after.

In 1987 she married Juan Manuel Santos -then Deputy Director of El Tiempo-; this time in a civil ceremony.

== Honours ==
=== Foreign honours ===
- Portugal:
  - Grand Cross of the Order of Prince Henry (13 November 2017)
  - Grand Cross of the Order of Merit (14 November 2012)
- Spain: Dame Grand Cross of the Order of Isabella the Catholic (27 February 2015)

=== Dynastic honours ===
- (Kingdom of the Two Sicilies) Two Sicilian Royal Family: Dame Grand Cross of the Two Sicilian Royal Sacred Military Constantinian Order of Saint George, Special Class (7 June 2013)

== See also ==
- Lorenza Villegas Restrepo

Honorary titles
Preceded by Lina Moreno de Uribe	First Lady of Colombia; 2010–2018	Succeeded by María Juliana Ruiz
