= Cecilia de la Fuente de Lleras =

First Lady of Colombia from 1966 to 1970

Cecilia de la Fuente ODB
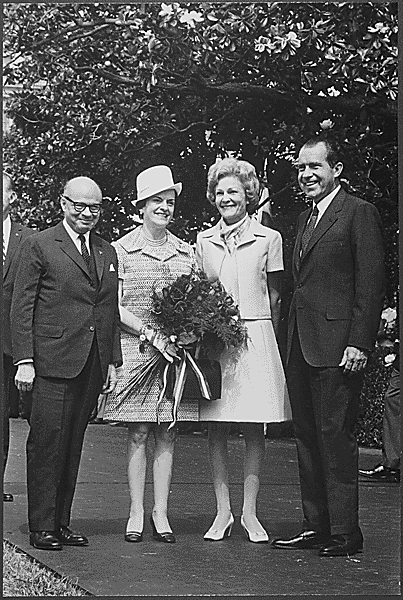
- Carlos and Cecilia de Lleras with Richard and Pat Nixon

First Lady of Colombia
- In role 7 August 1966 – 7 August 1970
- President: Carlos Lleras Restrepo
- Preceded by: Susana López de Valencia
- Succeeded by: María Cristina Arango

Personal details
- Born: Cecilia de la Fuente Cortés; 7 October 1916 Barcelona, Spain
- Died: 2 March 2004 (aged 87) Bogotá, D.C., Colombia
- Resting place: Central Cemetery of Bogotá
- Citizenship: Colombian
- Party: Liberal
- Spouse: Carlos Lleras Restrepo (m. 1933; died 1994)
- Children: 4

Cecilia de la Fuente de Lleras (7 October 1916 – 2 March 2004; Cecilia de la Fuente Cortés) ODB was the First lady of Colombia between 1966 and 1970, for having been married to the president of the time, Carlos Lleras Restrepo. She was the co-founder of the Colombian Institute of Family Welfare (ICBF), through the Cecilia Law, and supported social initiatives in favour of underprivileged children in her country.

She is the maternal grandmother of politician and former Vice President of Colombia Germán Vargas Lleras, and mother of politician Carlos Lleras de la Fuente.

== First Lady of Colombia ==
On 1 May 1966, her husband Carlos Lleras Restrepo became the new President of Colombia after his victory in the presidential elections, becoming the eleventh Liberal president in the history of Colombia, for which Cecilia would become the ninth woman to hold the office of First Lady of Colombia.

As first lady, her main focus was on the country's children, being the founder of the Colombian Institute of Family Welfare, this in response to problems that affect Colombian society, such as malnutrition, division and instability of the family nucleus and childhood. As part of her efforts to fight malnutrition and child hunger, Cecilia was awarded the highest National distinction, being Dame Grand Cross of the Order of Boyacá, being the first time that a First Lady received such a distinction.

Honorary titles
| Preceded by Susana López de Valencia | First Lady of Colombia; 1966–1970 | Succeeded by María Cristina Arango |
