= Colombian Institute of Family Welfare =

Colombian government agency

- Instituto Colombiano de Bienestar Familiar
- Formation: December 30, 1968; 57 years ago
- Type: Government agency
- Location: Bogotá, D.C., Colombia
- Region served: Colombia
- Key people: General Director
- Employees: 8,856 staff, 6,148 servers
- Website: www.icbf.gov.co

The Colombian Institute of Family Welfare (Spanish: Instituto Colombiano de Bienestar Familiar; ICBF) is a Colombian government agency, in charge of preventing and protecting children and adolescents in vulnerable conditions. It was established in 1968, by President Carlos Lleras Restrepo, at the initiative of his wife, the First Lady, Cecilia de la Fuente de Lleras, through the "Cecilia" law.

The ICBF currently has 33 regional headquarters and 215 zonal centers.
