= Lina Moreno de Uribe =

First Lady of Colombia from 2002 to 2010

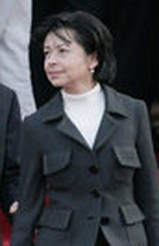

First Lady of Colombia
- In role 7 August 2002 – 7 August 2010
- President: Álvaro Uribe
- Preceded by: Nohra Puyana de Pastrana
- Succeeded by: María Clemencia de Santos

First Lady of Antioquia
- In office 1 January 1995 – 1 January 1998
- Governor: Álvaro Uribe
- Preceded by: Margarita Duque
- Succeeded by: Lina Bustamante

First Lady of Medellín
- In office 26 August 1982 – 16 December 1982
- Mayor: Álvaro Uribe
- Preceded by: Lina María Vélez
- Succeeded by: Cecilia Uribe

Personal details
- Born: Lina María Moreno Mejía; 4 December 1955 (age 70) Medellín, Antioquia, Colombia
- Party: Democratic Center
- Spouse: Álvaro Uribe (m. 1979)
- Children: Tomás; Jeronimo
- Education: Pontifical Bolivarian University (B.Phil.)

Lina María Moreno de Uribe CYC (née Moreno Mejía; born 13 November 1955) is the former first lady of Colombia, who served from 2002 to 2010 as the wife of Álvaro Uribe, the 43rd president of Colombia. She was also the first lady of Antioquia from 1995 to 1998 when her husband was governor.

Born in Medellín, Antioquia, Moreno de Uribe graduated from the Pontifical Bolivarian University with a degree in philosophy. She met her future husband, Álvaro Uribe, in March 1979 and they married later that year. The couple had two children between 1981 and 1983. Moreno de Uribe's political involvement began during her marriage. She campaigned alongside her husband during his 1994 Antioquia gubernatorial campaign.

As First Lady of Antioquia, Moreno de Uribe maintained a low profile. She became First Lady after her husband was inaugurated as president on 7 August 2001. She promoted reproductive freedom and free access to contraception.

== Personal life ==
Lina María Moreno Mejía was born on 13 November 1955 in Medellín, Antioquia, to Darío Moreno Restrepo (9 October 1920 — 25 April 2016) and Marina Mejía Mejía (1 August 1929 — 21 June 1997), the youngest and only daughter, she has one older brother named Carlos Enrique (b. 13 December 1953).

She met Álvaro Uribe Vélez, a 26-year Law graduate from the University of Antioquia, at the age of 23 in March 1979 by chance when she was walking with a friend in Medellín. After a very short romance, the two became engaged, and on 1 December 1979 they got married. She had dropped out of the Pontifical Bolivarian University to raise her children where she was studying literature and linguistics, but returned in 1986 and eventually graduated from it with a Bachelor of Philosophy.

Moreno and Uribe have two children: Tomás (b. 19 April 1981) a chemical engineer from the University of the Andes who is married (26 July 2008) to Isabel Sofía Cabrales Baquero (b. 17 July 1979), a Political Scientist from the Pontifical Xavierian University, former model and First Runner-Up at the Miss Colombia 2002 and who is expecting their first child; and Jerónimo Alberto (b. 16 July 1983) an Economist from the University of the Andes who is married (21 April 2012) to Shadia Farah Abuchaibe, a communications graduate from the Pontifical Xavierian University.

Se is a cousin of Bernie Moreno, the Republican senior United States senator from Ohio and Luis Alberto Moreno, the former Colombian Ambassador to the United States.

== First Lady of Colombia (2002–2010) ==
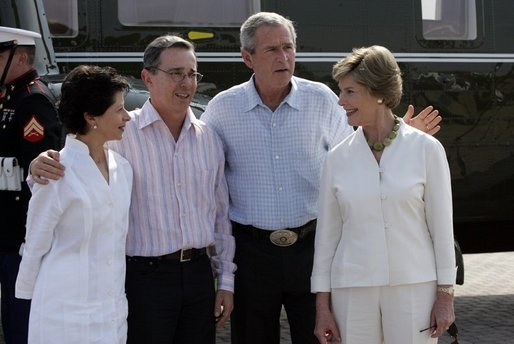
From left to right: First Lady Moreno and President Álvaro Uribe Vélez, together with the President of the United States George W Bush and First Lady of the United States Laura Bush during a visit to Prairie Chapel Ranch in 2005.

Despite the long political career of her husband, she chose to remain distant from the political sphere and campaigns, often drawing attention only for "her sobriety, her detachment from power and her directness". Months prior to her husband taking office, Moreno said in an interview that she would prefer not to use the style of First Lady, referring to it as "petulant and pink", pointing out that the title has been overused in that "there are many: that of the nation, of the department, of the municipality...", and stating that she would have liked to be addressed solely as "Lina María Moreno, wife of Álvaro Uribe", but establishing that that did not mean she was the sounding board of Uribe.

On 11 April 2002, following the election of her husband in the 2002 presidential election, Clara Lía Mora and Clara Elena Moreno Mora, Moreno's aunt and first-cousin respectively, were kidnapped from their home in the Caldas, Antioquia at gunpoint. They were later rescued in a joint effort between the National Police and the 4th Brigade of the National Army, but during the operation the assailants shot Mrs Mora on the chest seriously injuring her; both mother and daughter were treated and successfully recovered, but it put pressure on authorities to take higher security precautions in the following months before and after the inauguration.

In 2005, in an interview for El Tiempo, she told Yamid Amat that she was for the decriminalization of abortion, but still opposed to its legalization, a move that although not radical, contradicted the official position of the State and of the President.

== Honours ==
- Spain:
  - Dame Grand Cross of the Order of Isabella the Catholic (2005)

Honorary titles
Preceded by Nohra Puyana de Pastrana	First Lady of Colombia; 2002–2010	Succeeded by María Clemencia de Santos
