= María Juliana Ruiz =

First Lady of Colombia from 2018 to 2022

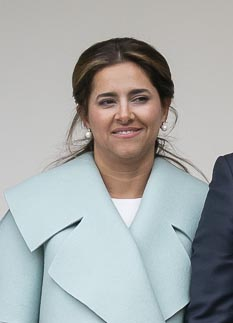
- Ruiz at the White House in 2019

First Lady of Colombia
- In role 7 August 2018 – 7 August 2022
- President: Iván Duque
- Preceded by: María Clemencia de Santos
- Succeeded by: Verónica Alcocer

Personal details
- Born: María Juliana Ruiz Sandoval; 25 May 1978 (age 48) Bogotá, D.C., Colombia
- Spouse: Iván Duque (m. 2003)
- Children: 3
- Education: Pontifical Xavierian University (BL); Washington College of Law

María Juliana Ruiz Sandoval (born 25 May 1978) is a Colombian lawyer who served as First Lady of Colombia from 2018 to 2022 as the wife of President Iván Duque.

== Biography ==
=== Early years ===
Ruiz was born in Bogotá in 1978, to Luis Fernando Ruiz and Gloria Sandoval. She did her basic studies at the Marymount School and later entered the Pontifical Xavierian University, where she studied law. After finishing her undergraduate studies, she moved to Paris to study at the Institut Catholique. She later moved to Washington, D.C., where she obtained a Master of Laws with an emphasis on International Business at the Washington College of Law of American University.

=== Career ===
Living in Washington, Ruiz managed to become professionally involved with the Organization of American States, where she worked for more than a decade initially in various capacities and later under the guidance of the Secretary General and the Assistant Secretary General, leading projects and commissions of the organization.

After her experience in the United States, she returned to her native country to join the Shaio Clinic, where she served as Secretary General until she became the nation's First Lady in 2018, when her husband Iván Duque Márquez was elected President of Colombia, succeeding Juan Manuel Santos. From her position, Ruiz has led various social projects, most notably the Great Alliance for Nutrition, an initiative that seeks to mitigate the impact of child malnutrition in the country.

== Personal life ==
Ruiz met Iván Duque Márquez in his youth and years later began a relationship with him while living in Washington, D.C. The couple married on 15 February 2003 and returned to Colombia when Duque decided to run for the Senate of the Republic. Their three children were born in Washington: Luciana, Eloísa and Matías.

During the COVID-19 pandemic, on 25 November 2020 she tested positive for COVID-19 but was asymptomatic. President Duque tested negative.

Honorary titles
Preceded by María Clemencia de Santos	First Lady of Colombia; 2018–2022	Succeeded by Verónica Alcocer
