= Guillermo León Valencia =

President of Colombia from 1962 to 1966

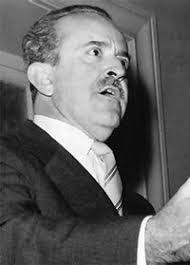

24th President of Colombia
- In office 7 August 1962 – 7 August 1966
- Preceded by: Alberto Lleras Camargo
- Succeeded by: Carlos Lleras Restrepo

Minister of Foreign Affairs
- In office 25 May 1953 – 13 June 1953
- President: Roberto Urdaneta; Acting President: 1951-1953
- Preceded by: Evaristo Sourdis Juliao
- Succeeded by: Juan Uribe Holguín

Colombia Ambassador to Spain
- In office 1950–1953
- President: Laureano Gómez
- Preceded by: Francisco Umaña
- Succeeded by: Alejandro Galvis

Personal details
- Born: Guillermo León Valencia Muñoz; 27 April 1909 Popayán, Cauca, Colombia
- Died: 4 November 1971 (aged 62) New York City, New York, U.S.
- Resting place: Museo Guillermo León Valencia
- Party: Conservative
- Spouse: Susana López Navia (1931–1964)
- Children: Pedro Felipe Valencia López; Alma Valencia López; Ignacio Valencia López; Diana Valencia López
- Relatives: Paloma Valencia (granddaughter)

Guillermo León Valencia Muñoz (27 April 1909 – 4 November 1971) was a Colombian politician, lawyer and diplomat who served as the 22nd President of Colombia from 1962 to 1966.

== Personal life ==
Valencia was born in Popayán, Cauca on April 27, 1909, to Colombian poet and politician Guillermo Valencia, and his wife Josefina Muñoz. He attended highschool at the Colegio Champagnat in Bogotá and graduated in December 1946. On January 31, 1931 he married Susana López Navia, a 20-year-old secretary with whom he had four children: Pedro Felipe, Alma, Ignacio, and Diana.

== Political career ==
Valencia was elected to the city council of Popayán and the Assembly of Cauca. Later he was also elected to the City Council of Bogotá and worked as diplomat for Colombia to the United Nations and was appointed Colombia's Ambassador to Spain by President Laureano Gómez Castro. In 1949 he was appointed by President Mariano Ospina Pérez as Colombian Minister of Foreign Affairs but declined the offer. However, four years later Valencia did accept the position and became Minister of Foreign Affairs on May 25, 1953, a post he held for the remainder of the administration of Roberto Urdaneta Arbeláez until General Rojas Pinilla took over.

During the transitional government of the Military Junta that took power after the coup d'état that deposed General Gustavo Rojas Pinilla, Valencia was under consideration to succeed the Junta. However, the political accord between the political forces of the time (in pursuit of a transition from a dictatorship to a democratic process), specified that a member of the Colombian Liberal Party succeed the Junta Militar. Consequently, Valencia had to wait until the following election. Valencia was nominated by the Colombian Conservative Party as their candidate for the 1962 Colombian presidential election, facing the liberal Alfonso López Michelsen. Valencia won: 1,636,081 votes to 625,630.

== Presidency ==
Valencia committed his administration to substantial economic and social reforms. On the economic front, he created the Junta Monetaria (Federal Reserve), doubled the production of electric power and promoted both oil drilling and the export of crude oil. In matters of social reform, his administration increased the national budget for education by 20%, and under the auspices of the government of the United States, launched the construction of Ciudad Kennedy, a project of 200,000 affordable homes for lower income citizens.

Valencia crushed several strikes. During his presidency, there was an industrial recession, inflation and rising unemployment.

Valencia's administration faced three major political challenges. The first was from the Alianza Nacional Popular (ANAPO), led by former president Rojas Pinilla, which became the main rival to the coalition led by Valencia. The second was from guerilla groups in rural areas. The third was from dissident elements in the military.

Political offices
Preceded by Alberto Lleras Camargo	President of Colombia; 1962–1966	Succeeded by Carlos Lleras Restrepo
