= María Michelsen de López =

First Lady of Colombia (1934–1938, 1942–1945)

First Lady of Colombia
- In role August 7, 1942 – August 7, 1945
- President: Alfonso López Pumarejo
- Preceded by: Lorenza Villegas de Santos
- Succeeded by: Bertha Puga de Lleras
- In role August 7, 1934 – August 7, 1938
- President: Alfonso López Pumarejo
- Preceded by: María Teresa Londoño
- Succeeded by: Lorenza Villegas de Santos

Personal details
- Born: María Michelsen Lombana; February 17, 1890 Bogotá, D.C., Colombia
- Died: January 22, 1949 (aged 58) Bogotá, D.C., Colombia
- Resting place: Central Cemetery of Bogotá
- Party: Liberal
- Spouse: Alfonso López Pumarejo (m. 1911)
- Children: María; Alfonso; Mercedes; Pedro; Fernando
- Parent(s): Carlos Michelsen Uribe (father); Antonia Lombana Buendía (mother)

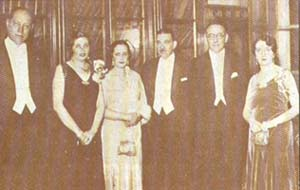
Enrique Olaya Herrera, María Michelsen de López, Clemencia Holguín de Urdaneta, Roberto Urdaneta Arbeláez, Alfonso López Pumarejo, and María Teresa Londoño de Olaya at the Jockey Club of Bogotá, August 7, 1934.

María Michelsen de López (née Michelsen Lombana; February 17, 1890 - January 22, 1949) was a Colombian scientist and philanthropist who served as first lady of Colombia from 1934 to 1938 and again from 1942 to 1945 as the wife of President Alfonso López Pumarejo. She and María Cristina Arango are the only two women in Colombian history who were both married to a president and the mother of a president. She was the second person to serve in this role during two non-consecutive terms in Colombia's history after Soledad Román de Núñez.

Michelsen de López was the first First Lady with a university degree. She was also notable for being the first to be called First Lady. Defender of the rights of orphans, she was the co-founder of several shelters in Bogotá.

== Early life ==
Maria Michelsen Lombana was born into a prestigious family of merchants and bankers. She was the daughter of scientist Carlos María Michelsen Uribe and his wife, Antonia Lombana Buendía y Barreneche.

Her father was the son of a Danish Jewish immigrant, Karl Michelsen Koppel, who, in turn, was related to the German industrialists Kopp Koppel, founders of the Bavaria brewery. Michelsen was the first Danish consul in Colombia following his commercial success in his native country.

== First Lady of Colombia (1934-1938 & 1942-1945) ==
María Michelsen de López's husband, Alfonso López Pumarejo, was elected president of Colombia in 1934, to succeed fellow liberal Enrique Olaya Herrera. María was the first woman to carry the title of first lady of the nation in Colombia, despite the fact that the figure already existed (tacitly) since the time of the republic with Simón Bolívar. From that moment on, the wife of the president of the day began to gain greater social importance.

María Michelsen de López co-founded, with Clemencia Holguín de Urdaneta, Tulia Umaña de Vargas, Jorge Bejarano, Emilio de Brigard Ortiz, Manuel Casabianca, José Antonio León Rey, Jorge Obando, and Manuel Antonio Suárez Hoyos, shelter for Abandoned Children, which was inaugurated on November 22, 1934.

Honorary titles
Preceded by María Teresa Londoño	First Lady of Colombia; 1934–1938	Succeeded by Lorenza Villegas de Santos
Preceded by Lorenza Villegas de Santos	First Lady of Colombia; 1942–1945	Succeeded by Bertha Puga de Lleras
