= Ana Milena Muñoz de Gaviria =

First Lady of Colombia from 1990 to 1994

Colombian Ambassador to Egypt
- In office March 12, 2019 – February 27, 2025
- President: Iván Duque (2019–2022); Gustavo Petro (2022–2025)
- Preceded by: Édgar Cely
- Succeeded by: Luz Elena Martínez Kasab

First Lady of Colombia
- In role August 7, 1990 – August 7, 1994
- President: César Gaviria
- Preceded by: Carolina Isakson de Barco
- Succeeded by: Jacquin Strouss de Samper

Personal details
- Born: Ana Milena Muñoz Gómez; January 27, 1956 (age 70) Pereira, Risaralda, Colombia
- Party: Liberal
- Spouse: César Gaviria (m. 1978)
- Children: Simón; María Paz
- Education: University of the Andes (BEc, 1978); Georgetown University (MA, 2000)

Ana Milena Muñoz de Gaviria (born Ana Milena Muñoz Gómez January 27, 1956) is a Colombian politician, economist, architect, columnist and diplomat who currently serves as Colombian Ambassador to Egypt since 2019. She previously was first lady of Colombia from 1990 to 1994 as the wife of President César Gaviria.

== Personal life ==
Ana Milena Muñoz Gómez was born on 27 January 1956 in Pereira, Risaralda, to Jorge Muñoz Mejía and Lida Gómez Vernaza, the third of six children. She attended the Colegio de los Sagrados Corazones in Pereira and is an alumna of the University of the Andes, where she obtained a degree in economics. She also holds a master's degree in Latin American history from Georgetown University, and in 2010 she returned to her alma mater to study architecture. Since February 26, 2019 she is the Ambassador of Colombia to Egypt and non resident Ambassador to Saudi Arabia and Oman.

She married César Gaviria on 28 June 1978 and they have two children, Simón and María Paz. She has 3 grand daughters Sofia, Filipa, and Victoria.

Honorary titles
Preceded by Carolina Isakson de Barco	First Lady of Colombia; 1990–1994	Succeeded by Jacquin Strouss Lucena
Diplomatic posts
Preceded by Édgar Cely	Colombian Ambassador to Egypt; 2019–2026	Incumbent
