= First Lady of Colombia =

Title typically held by wife of the president

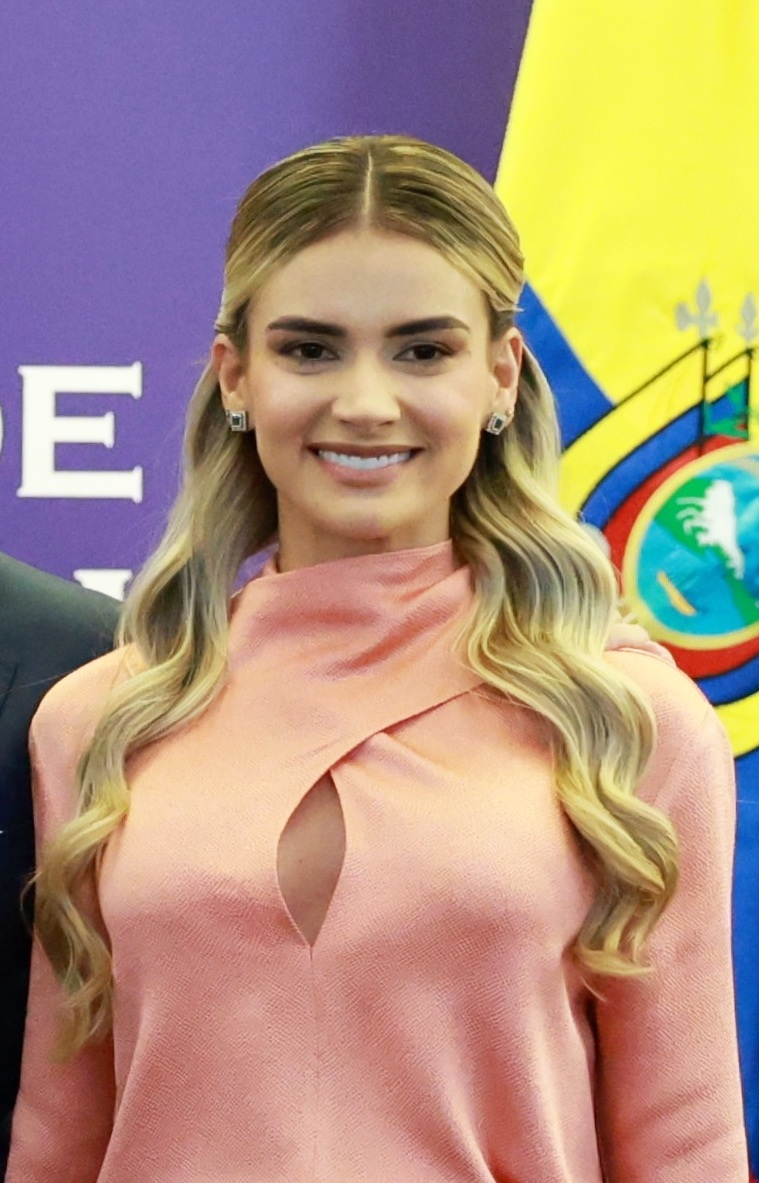
- Current; Ana Lucía Pineda since 7 August 2026
- Style: Mrs. Pineda; Madam First Lady
- Abbreviation: FLOC
- Residence: Casa de Nariño
- Inaugural holder: Soledad Román de Núñez
- Formation: 4 June 1887 (139 years ago)
- Website: Official website

First Lady of Colombia (First Lady of the Nation) is a title typically held by the wife of the president of Colombia, concurrent with the president's term in office. Although the first lady's role has never been codified or officially defined, she figures prominently in the political and social life of Colombia. The first lady of Colombia traditionally acts as the hostess of the Casa de Nariño. Historically, when a president has been unmarried or a widower, he has usually asked a relative to act as Casa de Nariño hostess.

Although the residence has always had domestic staff, since the beginning of the 20th century, the First Lady has been assisted by her events team, which over the years has grown to include a secretary general, under the direction of the Administrative Department of the Presidency of the Republic, thus forming the Office of the First Lady.

Since the 1900s, the role of first lady has changed considerably. It has come to include involvement in political campaigns, management of the Casa de Nariño, championship of social causes, and representation of the president at official and ceremonial occasions. Additionally, over the years individual first ladies have held influence in a range of sectors, from fashion to public opinion on policy, as well as advocacy for female empowerment. The current first lady, since August 7, 2026, is Ana Lucía Pineda, wife of President Abelardo de la Espriella.

== Origins of the title ==
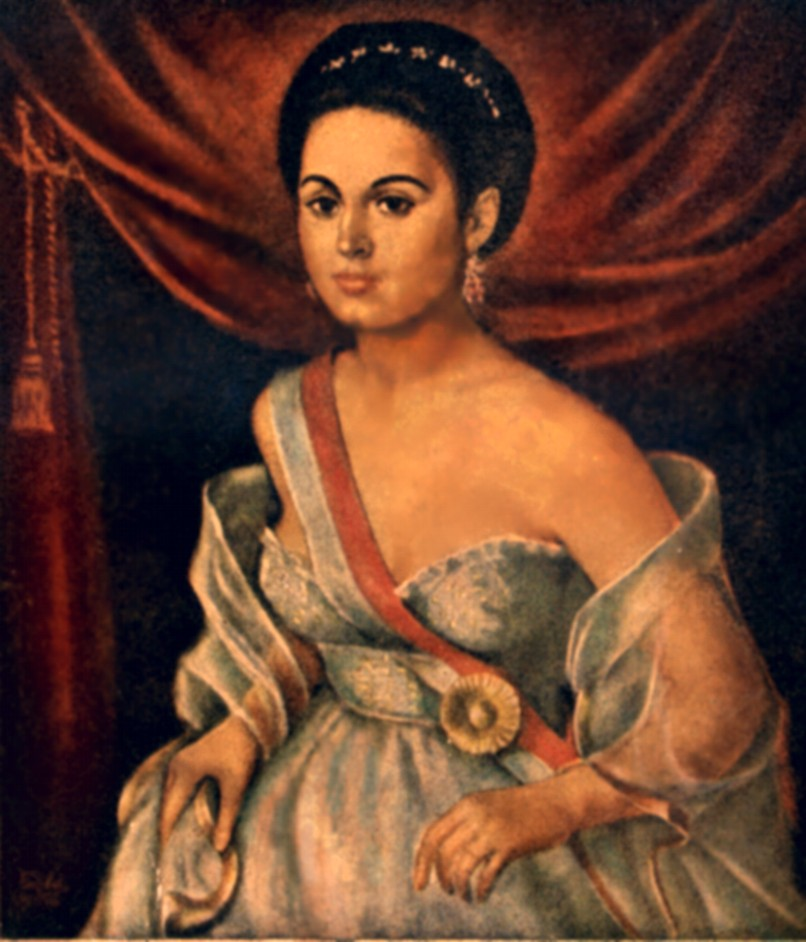
Manuela Sáenz, mistress of Bolívar, known as the Liberator of the Liberator.

The use of the title First lady to describe the wife or hostess of an executive originated in the United States. Meanwhile, in the early days of the republic in Colombia, there was no generally accepted title for the president's wife. Although the president's wife already acted as hostess of San Carlos Palace, the title is often described as existing only in a tactical sense. However, many of the wives of presidents in the states that preceded present-day Colombia were addressed according to their social or familial position, and were often called "Doña," "Lady," or "Mrs. with the suffix de followed by [President's Last Name]". Manuela Sáenz was often called "Manuelita" due to the customs of the time, where the suffix "-ta" was added affectionately for a woman who appeared young. One of the first uses of the term "First Lady" was in a 1934 newspaper article published by Cromos magazine. Its author analyzed how María Michelsen de López had dressed during the presidential inauguration of her husband, Alfonso López Pumarejo.

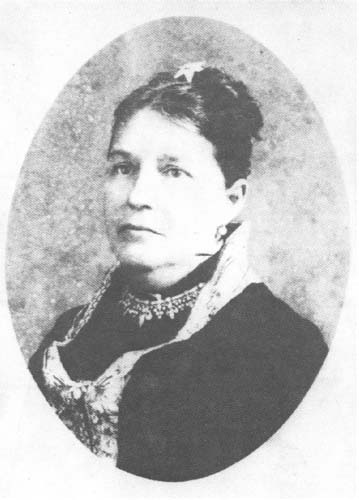
Soledad Román de Núñez, wife of the 1st President of Colombia Rafael Núñez.

Shortly after 1946, the title began to be used in Bogotá's social circles. The first person addressed with this title during her presidency was Bertha Hernández de Ospina, wife of Mariano Ospina Pérez. The national radio station Radio Nacional de Colombia used the phrase to describe her during its live coverage of that year's presidential inauguration, in which her family and her role in her husband's political career were discussed. Another known early written example comes from Helen Delpar's 1900 article, Red Against Blue: The Liberal Party in Colombian Politics, 1863 – 1899," in which she referred to Rafael Núñez's political reforms and the influence of "the First Lady of Colombia," referring to Soledad Román de Núñez. The title gained national recognition for the first time in 1956, when Cromos magazine continued to refer to presidents' wives as "the First Lady of the Nation" in its articles about the presidential inauguration.

=== Non-spouse in the role ===
Several women (at least three) who were not president's wives have served as first ladies, for example, when the president was single or widowed, or when the president's wife was unable to fulfill the duties of first lady. In these cases, the position was filled by a relative of the president, such as Sofía Reyes de Angulo, daughter of Reyes; and María Antonia Suárez, daughter of Suárez. Some presidents have also had family members temporarily assume the role of first lady while their wives were unable to perform their duties. This was the case with Sofía Petro, who accompanied her father in hosting duties while her mother, Verónica Alcocer, was visiting abroad.

=== Potential male title ===
Each of the 37 (Note: Rafael Núñez, Alfonso López Pumarejo and Alberto Lleras Camargo each served two presidencies and, as such, are counted twice. Here, "presidents" refers to the 37 people who have held the office and not the 40 presidencies that have been elected.) presidents of Colombia have been men, and all have either had their wives, or a female hostess, assume the role of first lady. Thus, a male equivalent of the title of first lady has never been needed.

In 2002, as Noemí Sanín became the second woman to win a major party's presidential nomination, questions were raised as to what her husband Javier Aguirre would be titled if she were to win the presidency. During the campaign, the title of First Gentleman of Colombia was most frequently suggested for Javier Aguirre. In addition, regional leaders' male spouses are typically called the first gentleman of their respective place (for example, Óscar Palacio was the first gentleman of San Andrés, while his wife, Susanie Davis, served as governor). Ultimately, Noemí Sanín lost the election, rendering this a moot point.

In 2018, Marta Lucía Ramírez took office as vice president, making her husband Álvaro Rincón the first male spouse of a nationally elected officeholder in Colombia. Rincón assumed the title of second gentleman of Colombia ("gentleman" replacing "lady" in the title) making it likely that any future male spouse of a president will be given the title of first gentleman.

== Role ==
The position of the first lady is unofficial, it is not an elected one, carries no official duties, and receives no salary. Nonetheless, first ladies have held a highly visible position in Colombian society.The role of the first lady has evolved over the years, but she is, first and foremost, the spouse of the president.

Until 1886, the first lady did not have any type of recognition or influence on Colombian political life. According to article 188 of the Constitution of Colombia established by the Constitutional Court of Colombia, before the public administration the first lady will hold the title of private citizen, although she is given an additional special role, being the wife of the president, along with this he would symbolically embody the idea of national unity. Until 1979, the first lady held the position of President of the Colombian Institute of Family Welfare, a position that had been held by the president's wife since its foundation in 1968. For its part, Law 7 of 1979 establishes that the first lady will remain linked to the Colombian Institute of Family Welfare, without specific functions in a purely honorary manner.

Since 2010, the first lady has represented the president on foreign trips under the status of ambassador on special mission.

== Office of the First Lady ==
The Office of the First Lady of Colombia reports to the First Lady to ensure she fulfills her duties as hostess of the Casa de Nariño and in her role as a national social gestor. It is also in charge of all social and ceremonial events at the Casa de Nariño. The First Lady is considered a private citizen before the public administration and therefore usually does not have her own staff; when she does, it includes a general secretary and a protocol advisor. The Office of the First Lady is a protocol entity within the Office of the Casa de Nariño, a branch of the Office of the President administered by the Administrative Department of the Presidency of the Republic.

== Influence ==
Some first ladies have garnered attention for their clothing, style, and political and social influence. María Clemencia de Santos, for example, was hailed as a regional fashion icon: her style was widely covered by magazines and digital media, and she was included among the Best Dressed First Ladies in 2016. Verónica Alcocer also received significant attention for her fashion choices: Vanitatis magazine highlighted her outfits, which carried social and political messages.

== Causes and initiatives ==
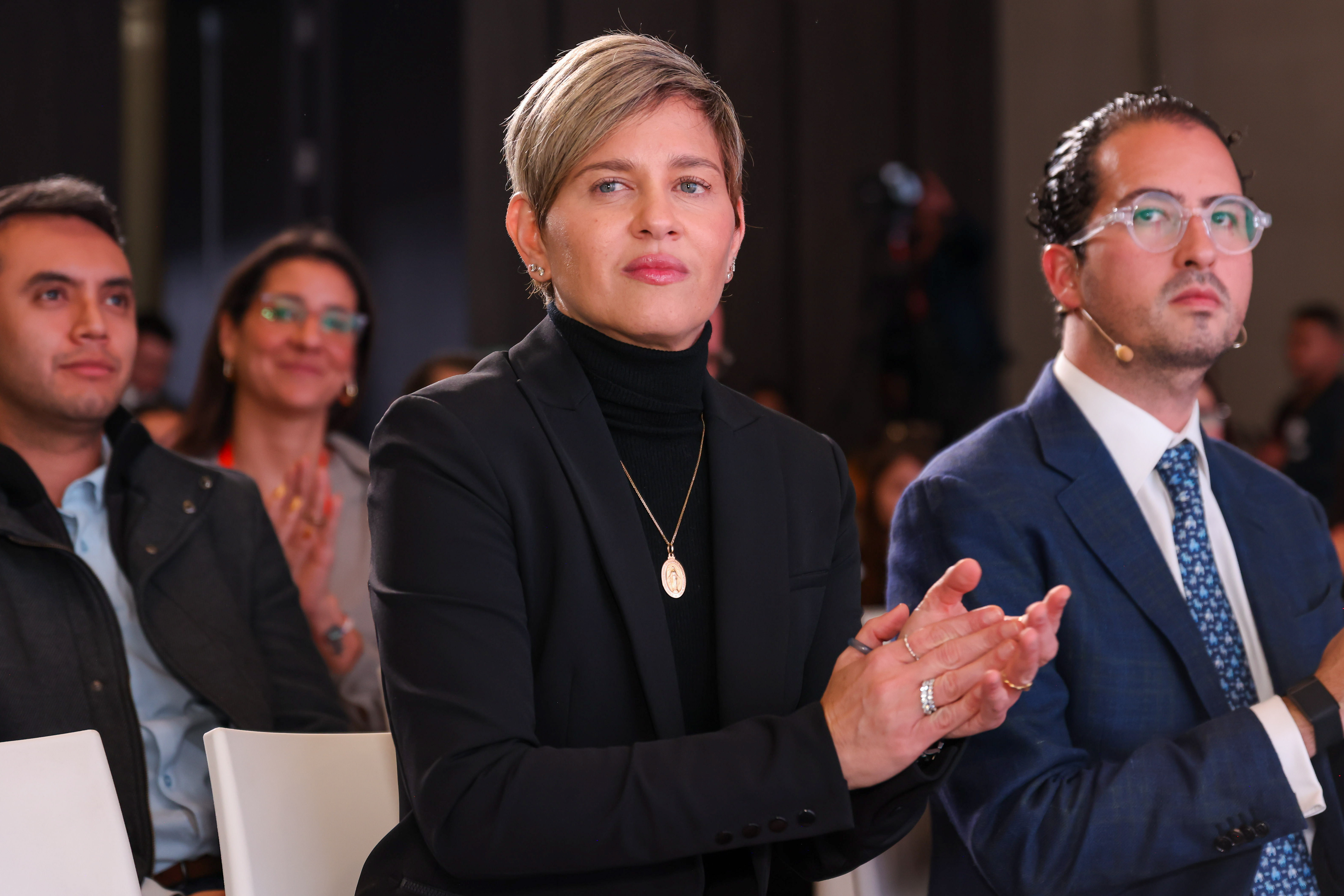
First Lady Verónica Alcocer during the event to eradicate sexual violence in childhood.

Since the 1920s, many first ladies have become public speakers, adopting specific causes. It also became common for the first lady to hire a staff to support her agenda. Recent causes of the first lady are:

- María Teresa Londoño:
  - Patriotism during the Colombian-Peruvian war.
- María Michelsen de López:
  - Orphans'rights and care.
- Lorenza Villegas de Santos:
  - Public health care services.
- Bertha Hernández de Ospina:
  - Women's suffrage.
- Cecilia de la Fuente de Lleras:
  - Colombian Institute of Family Welfare.
- Cecilia Caballero Blanco:
  - Legitimacy of children and their parentage.
- Nydia Quintero Turbay:
  - Natural disasters assistance.
- Nohra Puyana de Pastrana:
  - Humanitarian aid in natural dissasters.
- Ana Milena Muñoz de Gaviria:
  - Higher education and culture.
- Lina Moreno de Uribe:
  - Sexual and reproductive health rights for women.
- María Clemencia de Santos:
  - Humanitarian aid throughout the country.
- María Juliana Ruiz:
  - Child malnutrition
- Verónica Alcocer:
  - Child sexual abuse erradication

== See also ==
- Colombian Institute of Family Welfare
- Bank of the Republic
- San Carlos Palace
- Museo Casa de Moneda
- List of spouses of heads of state
- Second Lady or Second Gentleman of Colombia
- Independence Day
- El Cabrero
