= Alberto Lleras Camargo =

President of Colombia (1958-1962; 1945-1946)

His Excellency Alberto Lleras Camargo

19th and 23rd President of Colombia
- In office 7 August 1958 – 7 August 1962
- Preceded by: Gustavo Rojas Pinilla
- Succeeded by: Guillermo León Valencia
- In office 7 August 1945 – 7 August 1946
- Preceded by: Alfonso López Pumarejo
- Succeeded by: Mariano Ospina Pérez

Presidential Designate
- In office 27 July 1945 – 8 August 1946
- President: Alfonso López Pumarejo
- Preceded by: Darío Echandía
- Succeeded by: Carlos Arango Vélez

1st Secretary General of the Organization of American States
- In office 30 April 1948 – 1 August 1954
- Preceded by: Position established
- Succeeded by: Carlos Dávila

Minister of Foreign Affairs
- In office 12 February 1945 – 2 August 1945
- President: Alfonso López Pumarejo
- Preceded by: Darío Echandía
- Succeeded by: Francisco Umaña Bernal

Minister of Government
- In office 8 October 1943 – 12 February 1945
- President: Alfonso López Pumarejo
- Preceded by: Darío Echandía
- Succeeded by: Antonio Rocha Alvira
- In office 27 February 1937 – 7 August 1938
- President: Alfonso López Pumarejo
- Preceded by: Darío Echandía
- Succeeded by: Carlos Lozano y Lozano
- In office 10 October 1935 – 12 January 1937
- President: Alfonso López Pumarejo
- Preceded by: Darío Echandía
- Succeeded by: Darío Echandía

Colombia Ambassador to the United States
- In office 6 May 1943 – 8 October 1943
- President: Alfonso López Pumarejo
- Preceded by: Gabriel Turbay
- Succeeded by: Gabriel Turbay

Minister of National Education
- In office 28 January 1937 – 27 February 1937
- President: Alfonso López Pumarejo
- Preceded by: Darío Echandía
- Succeeded by: Tulio Enrique Tascón Pérez

Personal details
- Born: Alberto Lleras Camargo; 3 July 1906 Bogotá, Colombia
- Died: 4 January 1990 (aged 83) Bogotá, Colombia
- Party: Liberal
- Spouse: Bertha Puga Martínez (m. 1930)
- Children: Alberto; Ximena; Marcela; Consuelo
- Education: Del Rosario University

Alberto Lleras Camargo (3 July 1906 – 4 January 1990) was President of Colombia twice (1945–1946, 1958–1962), and the 1st Secretary General of the Organization of American States (1948–1954). A journalist and liberal party politician, he also served as Minister of Government, Minister of Foreign Affairs, and as Minister of National Education in the administrations of President Alfonso López Pumarejo. He briefly attended the National University of Colombia in Bogotá to study politics, but dropped out later to pursue journalism.

Lleras Camargo served as congressman of Colombia. He was also a cousin of later president Carlos Lleras Restrepo. He died in 1990 after suffering a long illness.

== Political career and first presidency ==
He attended the traditional Colegio Mayor de Nuestra Señora del Rosario. In 1929, he was elected deputy assemblyman on the Bogotá city council, his first entrance into politics. The following year he became Secretary of the Executive Committee of the Colombian Liberal Party and in 1931, he was elected to the Colombian Chamber of Representatives. That same year, he became the first Liberal to preside over the Chamber in more than forty years.

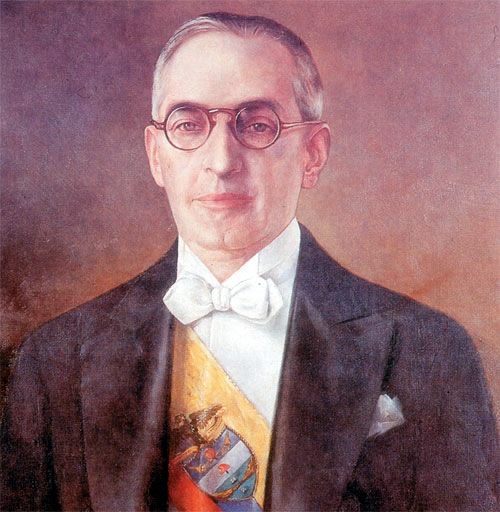
President Alfonso Lopez Pumarejo

After Alfonso López Pumarejo was elected President of Colombia in 1934, Lleras Camargo was named Cabinet Secretary. In 1935, he became the Minister of Government, a position he occupied until the end of López Pumarejo's presidential term in 1938. In 1938, he founded the newspaper El Liberal, which promoted López Pumarejo's re-election. In 1941, he returned to and once again presided over the Chamber of Representatives. When López Pumarejo was re-elected president in 1942, he once again named Lleras Camargo the Minister of Government. Aside from a brief interruption in 1943, when Lleras Camargo became the Colombian Ambassador to the United States, he occupied that position until 1944, when intense political instability disrupted López Pumarejo's presidency. In July 1944, after López Pumarejo stepped down, Lleras Camargo fought off a coup attempt against Darío Echandía, who had been temporarily designated as president.

In 1945, he became Minister of Foreign Relations, and in that capacity, represented Colombia at the Chapultepec Conference and the United Nations Conference on International Organization in San Francisco, which created the United Nations. But that same year, the Senate named designated him as Acting President, a position he occupied until 1946, when Conservative Mariano Ospina Pérez was elected president. At only thirty-nine years-old, he became one of the youngest acting presidents in Colombian history. During his short year in office, the Greater Colombian Merchant Fleet was founded and the Constitutional Reform of 1945 completed.

== Early Political Career ==
On May 29, 1926, Lleras, then 19 years old, participated in a march in support of Laureano Gómez, the Minister of Public Works under President Pedro Nel Ospina, whose plans to build a road had been blocked by the Council of State. It is known that Germán Arciniegas, seeing Lleras's fears about delivering his speech in defense of Gómez, decided to carry him to give the young man confidence.

== Founding of the Organization of American States ==
After leaving the presidency in 1946, Lleras Camargo founded the highly regarded news magazine Semana. Owing to the respect and prestige he had earned as Minister of Foreign Relations and President of Colombia, he was named Director of the Pan American Union in 1947. He launched a restructuring effort, which culminated in the founding the Organization of American States in 1948. Lleras Camargo served as the first General Secretary between 1948-1949 and later completed a full five-year term between 1950 and 1954. During his second term, the organization became more consolidated as a hemispheric organization, with increased continental participation.

== Notes ==
Political offices
Preceded by Alfonso López Pumarejo	President of Colombia; 1945–1946	Succeeded by Mariano Ospina Pérez
Preceded by Gustavo Rojas Pinilla	President of Colombia; 1958–1962	Succeeded by Guillermo León Valencia
