= Carlos Lleras Restrepo =

Colombian politician and lawyer (1908–1994)

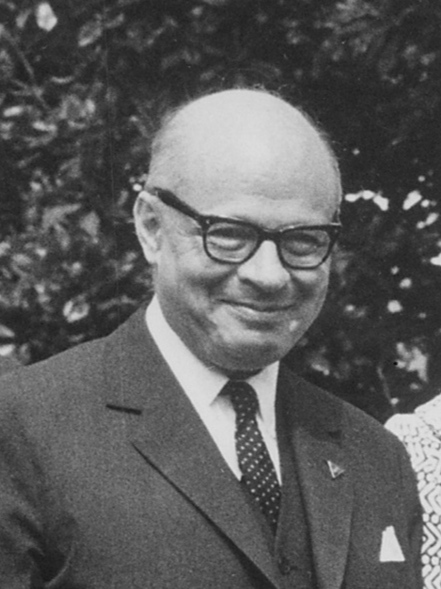

25th President of Colombia
- In office 7 August 1966 – 7 August 1970
- Preceded by: Guillermo León Valencia
- Succeeded by: Misael Pastrana Borrero

Presidential Designate
- In office 31 August 1960 – 2 April 1963
- President: Alberto Lleras Camargo (1960–1962); Guillermo León Valencia (1962–1963)
- Preceded by: Darío Echandía
- Succeeded by: José Antonio Montalvo

Minister of Finance and Public Credit
- In office 8 October 1943 – 6 March 1944
- President: Alfonso López Pumarejo
- Preceded by: Arcesio Londoño Palacio
- Succeeded by: Gonzalo Restrepo Jaramillo
- In office 26 August 1941 – 7 August 1942
- President: Eduardo Santos Montejo
- Preceded by: Gonzalo Restrepo Jaramillo
- Succeeded by: Alfonso Araújo Gaviria
- In office 7 August 1938 – 24 March 1941
- President: Eduardo Santos Montejo
- Preceded by: Héctor José Vargas
- Succeeded by: Gonzalo Restrepo Jaramillo

Personal details
- Born: 12 April 1908 Bogotá, D.C., Colombia
- Died: 27 September 1994 (aged 86) Bogotá, D.C., Colombia
- Cause of death: Respiratory failure
- Party: Liberal
- Spouse: Cecilia de la Fuente Cortés (m. 1933; died 1994)
- Children: Clemencia Lleras de la Fuente; Carlos Lleras de la Fuente; María Inés Lleras de la Fuente; Fernando Lleras de la Fuente
- Education: National University of Colombia (LLD, 1930)
- Profession: Lawyer

Carlos Alberto Lleras Restrepo (12 April 1908 – 27 September 1994) was a Colombian politician and lawyer who served the 23rd President of Colombia from 1966 to 1970.

== Biographic data ==
Lleras was born in Bogotá, on 12 April 1908. He was the third son of the doctor physician and researcher, Federico Lleras and Amalia Restrepo. He died in Bogotá, on 27 September 1994.

== Early life ==
Lleras studied in La Salle Institute in Bogotá and later studied jurisprudence at Universidad Nacional de Colombia. He obtained his law degree in 1930. He was also a member of Phi Iota Alpha, the oldest inter-collegiate Greek-letter organization for international Latin American students.

== Private life ==
Lleras was a cousin of Alberto Lleras Camargo, another important Colombian politician and President of Colombia. He was married to Cecilia de la Fuente, with who he had four children. German Vargas Lleras is his grandson.

== Political career ==
Lleras became involved in politics at an early age. In 1929, he was elected by the liberal party as delegate to the National Convention of Apulo. By age 21 he was a member in the national committee of the Colombian Liberal Party. Lleras was elected to the state senate of Cundinamarca, and later MP as congressman in the House of Representatives.

In 1932, during the so-called “Liberal Republic”, Lleras was appointed General Comptroller of the country and in 1938 he was appointed as Minister of Finance (Ministro de Hacienda) during the presidency of Eduardo Santos. He was elected as Chairman of the Liberal Party several times and Senator of the Republic.

Lleras ran for president of Colombia for the first time in 1944, but his bid was unsuccessful. On 27 November 1965, he accepted the nomination of the liberal party, and received the endorsement of the conservative party. This made him the official candidate of the “National Front”, and he won the election in 1966.

After the presidency, Lleras founded and produced the political magazine “Nueva Frontera”.

== Presidency ==
Lleras was inaugurated as President of Colombia on 7 August 1966, and called his administration "the era of national transformation" ("Transformación Nacional").

During his administration, the Colombian Institute for Agrarian Reform (INCORA) promoted the redistribution of usable land to the peasants and unemployed workers in the country, issuing more than 60,000 titles in 1968 and 1969 alone.

In 1968, his administration implemented a constitutional reform to allow the executive greater powers in shaping legislation on fiscal policies and public works. The reform allowed the executive to intervene in the Central Bank and decree an economic emergency, granting the executive special powers. The administration prioritized giving stability to the exchange rate, which had previously been erratic.

Lleras's administration implemented a land reform to redistribute more land to smaller farmers.

The administration clamped down on urban labor unrest and did not accommodate student protestors.

Lleras implemented an aggressive and broad program of social and economic reforms and created the following agencies and institutions: the national savings fund ("Fondo Nacional del Ahorro"); the Colombian Institute for the family wellbeing ("Instituto Colombiano de Bienestar Familiar"); the institute to protect non renewable resources ("Instituto de Recursos Naturales no Renovables"); the agency to promote exports ("Fondo de Promoción de Exportaciones" 'PROEXPO'); the national agency of Colombian culture ("Instituto Colombiano de Cultura" 'Colcultura'); the national agency for the construction of schools ("Instituto Colombiano de Construcciones Escolares" 'Icce'); and the national institution to promote and finance superior education ("Instituto Colombiano para el Fomento de la Educación Superior" 'Icfes').

Political offices
Preceded by Guillermo León Valencia	President of Colombia; 1966–1970	Succeeded by Misael Pastrana Borrero
