= Valencia family =

Colombian political family and former first family

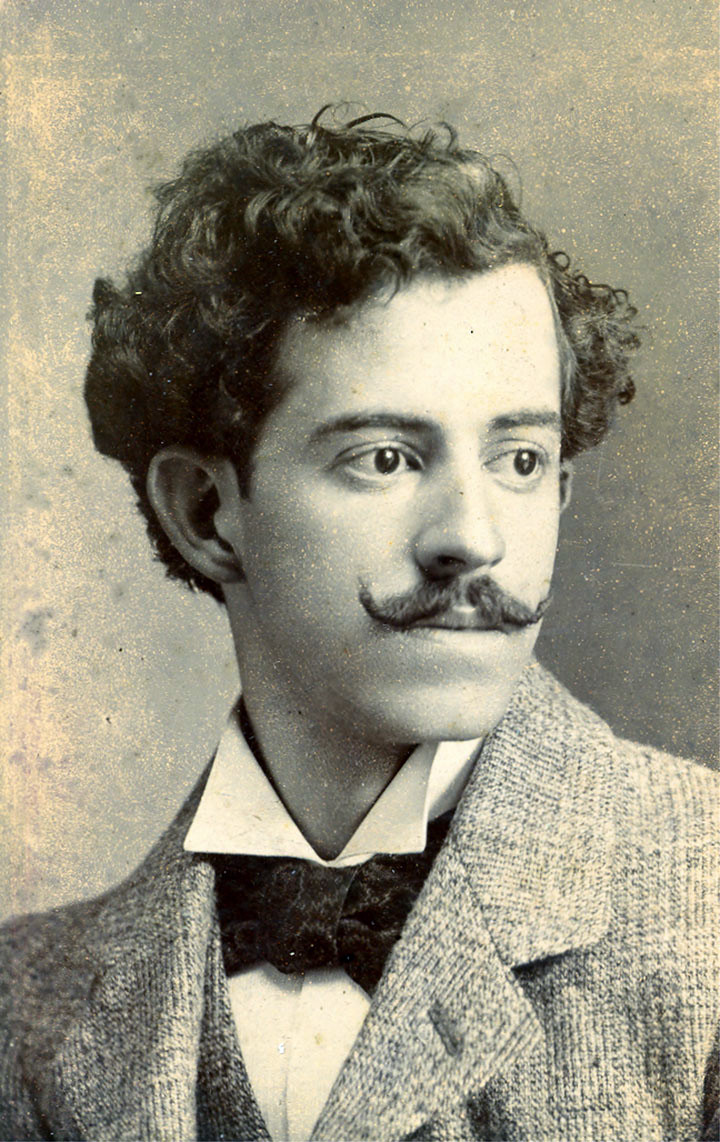
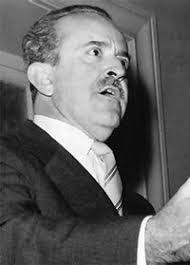
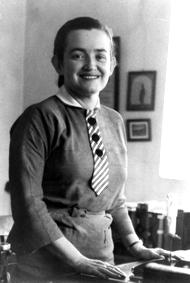
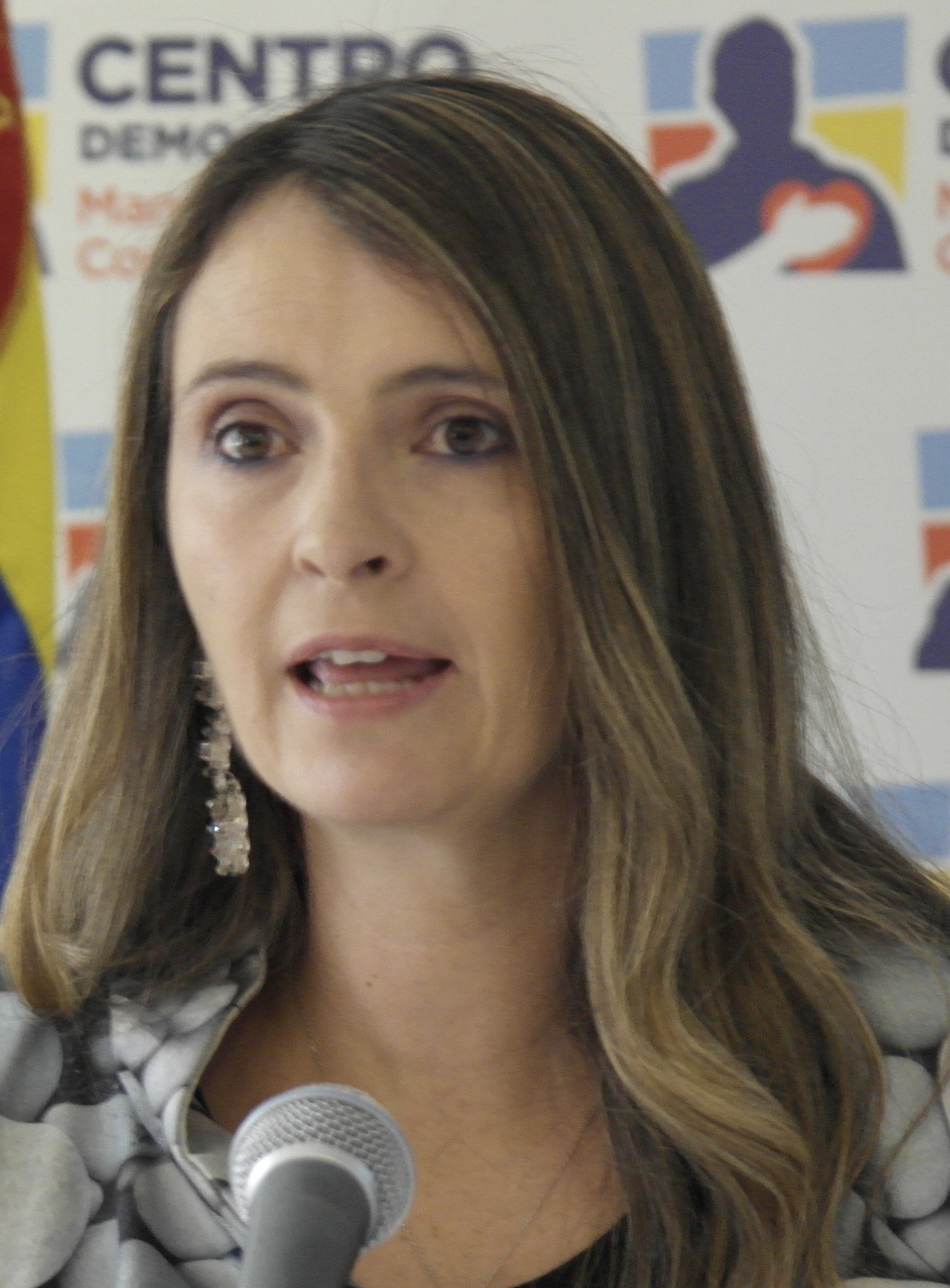
- Guillermo Valencia Guillermo León Valencia Josefina Valencia Paloma Valencia
- Current region: Popayán, Cauca
- Origin: Cauca; Zamora
- Titles: List: President of Colombia; First Lady of Colombia; Governor of Cauca; Colombian Ambassador (to Japan); Colombian Ambassador (to Morocco); Minister of National Education; Minister of Foreign Affairs of Colombia; President of the Senate; President of the Chamber of Representatives; Senator; Colombian Congressman (from Cauca)
- Connected families: Muñoz family López family Hubach family Iragorri family Rodríguez family

The Valencia family is a Colombian political family that has played a prominent role in Colombian politics since the 1960s, primarily as the first family of Colombia from 1962 to 1966 during the presidency of Guillermo León Valencia. They also played a prominent role in Colombian diplomacy, science and business.

Best known for their involvement in politics, family members have held various national and state offices over four generations, including the first female Minister (Josefina Valencia; Colombian Ambassador Ignacio Valencia; Senator Paloma Valencia; President Guillermo León Valencia). Other family members include the mayor of Popayán Álvaro Pio Valencia and the Minister Aurelio Iragorri Valencia.

The Valencia family is of primarily Spanish descent from the Zamora region. It is one of the few Colombian families with direct Spanish aristocratic origin. The Valencia family has ancient origins in Cauca, although there are also descendants in Antioquía.

== Relatives ==
- Antonio Valencia, (1784–1838), Father of Joaquín Valencia
  - Joaquín Valencia, (1825–1887), Antonio Valencia's son, father of Guillermo Valencia
    - Guillermo Valencia (1873–1943), Joaquín Valencia's son; Poet and politician
    - Josefina Muñoz de Valencia (1892–1952), wife of Guillermo Valencia
      - Guillermo León Valencia (1909–1971), Guillermo Valencia's eldest son; 24th president of Colombia, Minister of Foreign Affairs of Colombia and Senator of Colombia
      - Susana López de Valencia (1910–1964), wife of Guillermo León Valencia, First Lady
        - Pedro Felipe Valencia (1931-2000), Guillermo León Valencia's eldest son; Colombian Ambassador to Japan
        - Una Eileen Barrón de Valencia
          - Susana Valencia
          - Guillermo Felipe Valencia
          - Natalia Valencia
        - Alma Valencia
        - Ignacio Valencia (1936–2023), Guillermo León Valencia's youngest son; Colombian Ambassador to Morocco, Senator of Colombia and Representative Chamber Member to Cauca.
        - Dorotea Laserna de Valencia
          - Cayetana Valencia
          - Paloma Valencia (born 1976), Ignacio Valencia's youngest daughter; Senator of Colombia and 2026 presidential candidate
          - Tomás Rodríguez Barraquer (born c. 1973), Paloma Valencia's husband.
            - Amapola Rodríguez Valencia
          - Pedro Agustín Valencia
        - Diana Valencia de Iragorri (1963–2018), Guillermo León Valencia's youngest daughter
        - Aurelio Iragorri (1937–2020), Guillermo León Valencia's youngest son-in-law; President of the Senate, Senator of Colombia, President of the Chamber of Representatives, Representative Chamber Member to Cauca, Governor of Cauca and President of the Union Party for the People.
          - Aurelio Iragorri Valencia (born 1966), Diana Valencia de Iragorri's only son; Minister of Agriculture and Rural Development, Minister of the Interior and President of the Union Party for the People.
      - Álvaro Pio Valencia (1911-1998), Guillermo Valencia's youngest son; Mayor of Popayán, Colombian Ambassador to Brazil.
      - Josefina Valencia (1913–1991), Guillermo Valencia's daughter; first female Minister of National Education and the first female Governor of Cauca
      - Enrique Hubach (1896–1968), Guillermo Valencia's son-in-law; Geologist and researcher
        - Martha Hubach
        - Erna Hubach

== See also ==
- List of presidents of Colombia
- Political families of the world
