= Josefina Valencia =

Colombian politician (1913–1991)

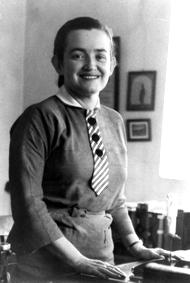

Minister of National Education
- In office 16 September 1956 – 10 May 1957
- President: Gustavo Rojas Pinilla
- Preceded by: Gabriel Betancourt Mejía
- Succeeded by: Próspero Carbonell MacAusland

Governor of Cauca
- In office 21 September 1955 – 16 September 1956
- Appointed by: Gustavo Rojas Pinilla
- Preceded by: Tomás Castrillón Muñoz
- Succeeded by: Víctor Gómez Gómez

Personal details
- Born: Josefina Valencia Muñoz; 22 September 1913 Popayán, Cauca, Colombia
- Died: 4 October 1991 (aged 78) Madrid, Madrid, Spain
- Resting place: Museo Guillermo León Valencia
- Party: National Popular Alliance
- Other political affiliations: Conservative
- Spouse: Enrique Hubach Eggers (m. 1943; dead 1968)
- Relations: Valencia family
- Children: Martha Hubach Valencia; Erna Hubach Valencia
- Occupation: Politician

Josefina Valencia de Hubach (née Valencia Muñoz; 22 September 1913 – 4 October 1991) was a Colombian politician, and the first woman to be appointed governor of a Colombian department as Governor of Cauca, and the first woman to be appointed to a cabinet-level position as the 46th Minister of National Education of Colombia.

A leader of the women's suffrage movement in Colombia, she became the first woman to be appointed to serve in a national legislative position in Colombia as part of the National Constituent Assembly in 1954 where she helped introduce what would eventually be the Legislative Act No. 3, which modified Article 171 of the Colombian Constitution of 1886 that granted universal suffrage to women.

== Background ==
Josefina was born in Popayán on 22 September 1913 to Guillermo Valencia and Josefina Muñoz de Valencia, the third of five children, her siblings were Guillermo León, Álvaro Pío, Luz and Guimar. In 1943 she married Enrique Hubach Eggers, a Chilean geologist and scientist; Enrique and Josefina had three daughters: Martha, Erna, and a third who died at a young age.

== Career ==
Valencia was already familiar with the politics of Colombia in the 1950s; her father, Guillermo Valencia had been an active member of the Colombian Conservative Party, a Congressman, Minister of Finance, Governor, and presidential candidate in the elections of 1918, and 1930, and her brother Guillermo León had been Councilman, Congressman, Minister of Foreign Affairs, and Ambassador.

In April 1954, the National Feminist Organization of Colombia under the leadership of former First Lady of Colombia, Bertha Hernández de Ospina, and María Currea.

When General Gustavo Rojas Pinilla came to power in a military coup d'état, the women's suffrage movement had an ideological split between those who opposed military rule and those who supported the regime. Valencia seized the opportunity and joined the National Popular Alliance, a political movement started by General Rojas. Valencia became a supporter and confidant of General Rojas in a time when the support of women was becoming more and more important. Her direct lobbying to the President paid off, On 28 July 1954 in an unusual move, General Rojas who had maintained the National Constituent Assembly that had been started by his predecessor, the deposed Roberto Urdaneta Arbeláez, named Valencia Member of the National Assembly in representation of the Conservative Party with Teresa Santamaría as her alternate, thus becoming the first woman to serve in a Colombian national legislative body; she was later joined by Esmeralda Arboleda Cadavid in representation of the Liberal Party with María Currea as her alternate. They joined forces and introduced the Legislative Act on the Citizenship of Women to be studied and debated by the Assembly. On 25 August 1954 the plenary of the National Constituent Assembly approved the Legislative Act No. 3 which modified Article 171 of the Colombian Constitution of 1886, granting universal suffrage to all Colombian women.

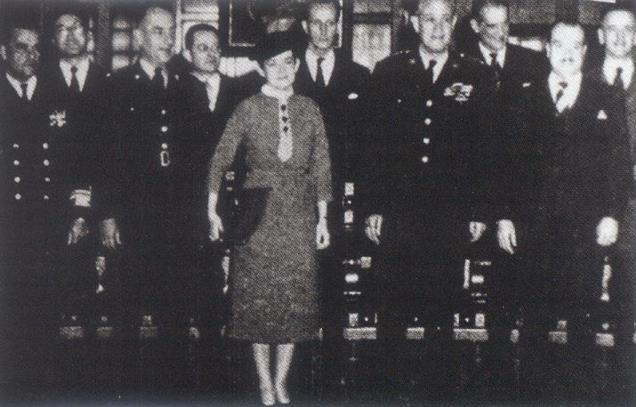
President Gustavo Rojas Pinilla (centre right) and Josefina Valencia (centre left) surrounded by the rest of the Council of Ministers.

On 21 September 1955, General Rojas Pinilla appointed Valencia governor of her native Department of Cauca, the first woman to ever exercise an executive position in the country, a post in which she served until September 16, 1956, when she was called to Bogotá to serve as the first female government minister, in the Ministry of National Education.

By means of Decree No. 1283 of 19 June 1957, the Colombian Military Junta that succeeded Rojas Pinilla in the executive, appointed her Permanent Delegate of Colombia to the UNESCO in Paris, becoming the first Ambassadress of Colombia.
