= 1918 Colombian presidential election =

Presidential elections were held in Colombia on 10 February 1918. The result was a victory for Marco Fidel Suárez of the Conservative Party, who received 53% of the vote. Fidel took office on 7 August.

Although opponent Guillermo Valencia was also a member of the Conservative Party, he received support from the Liberal Party.

== Results ==
Candidate	Party	Votes	%
Marco Fidel Suárez	Colombian Conservative Party	214,839	52.76
Guillermo Valencia	Colombian Conservative Party	168,254	41.32
José Lombana	Independent	24,041	5.90
Others		42	0.01
Total		407,176	100.00
Valid votes		407,176	99.98
Invalid/blank votes		82	0.02
Total votes		407,258	100.00
Source: Historia Electoral Colombiana
