= Popayán =

City in Cauca, Colombia

- Municipality and city
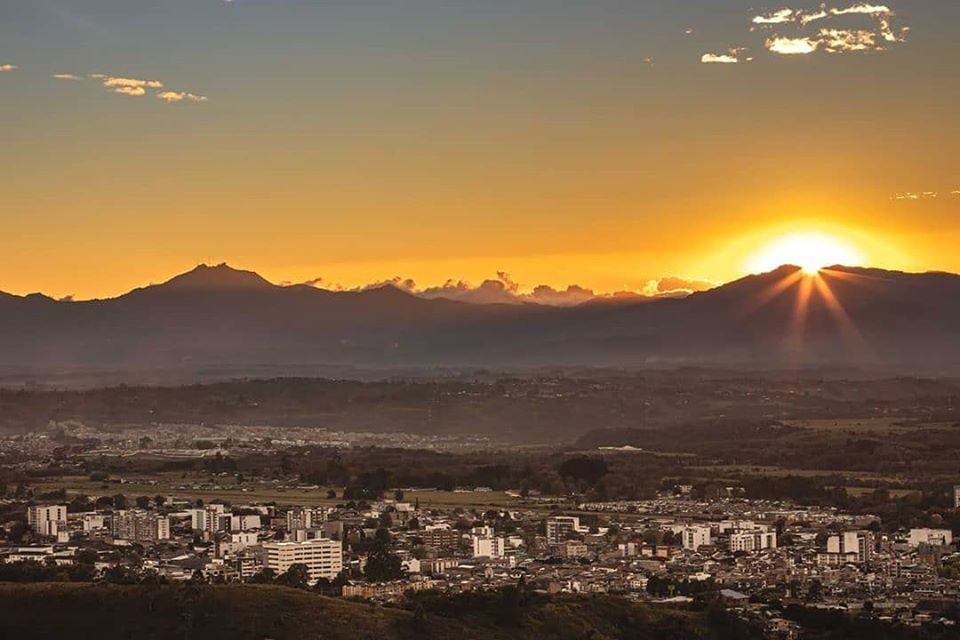
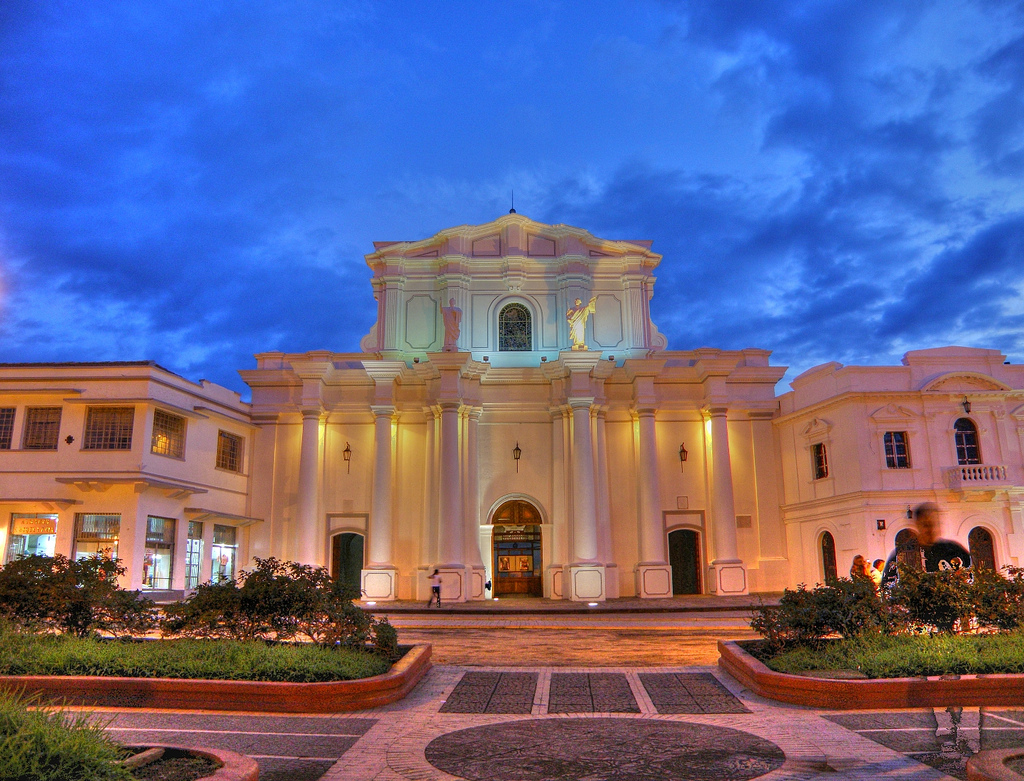
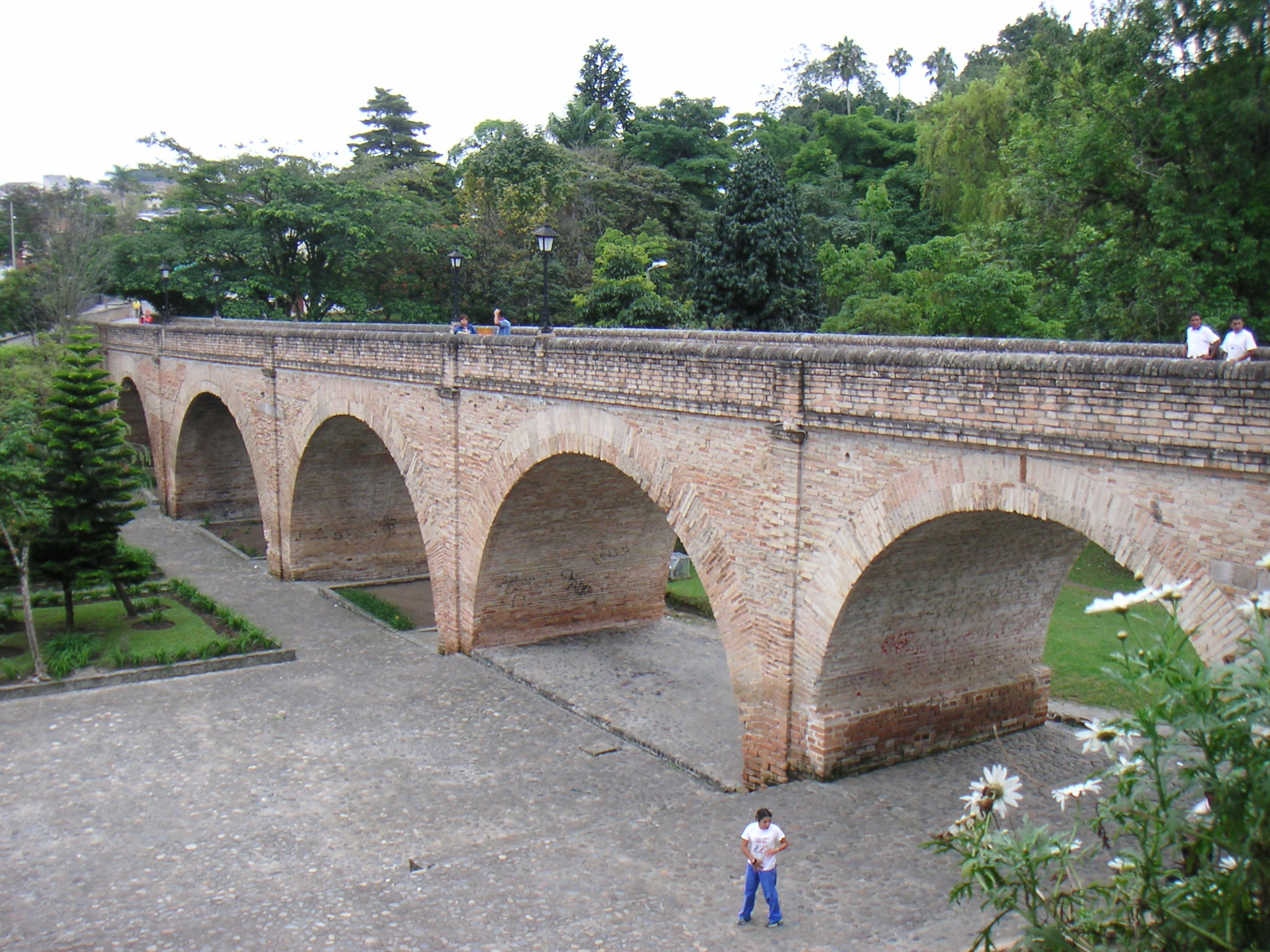
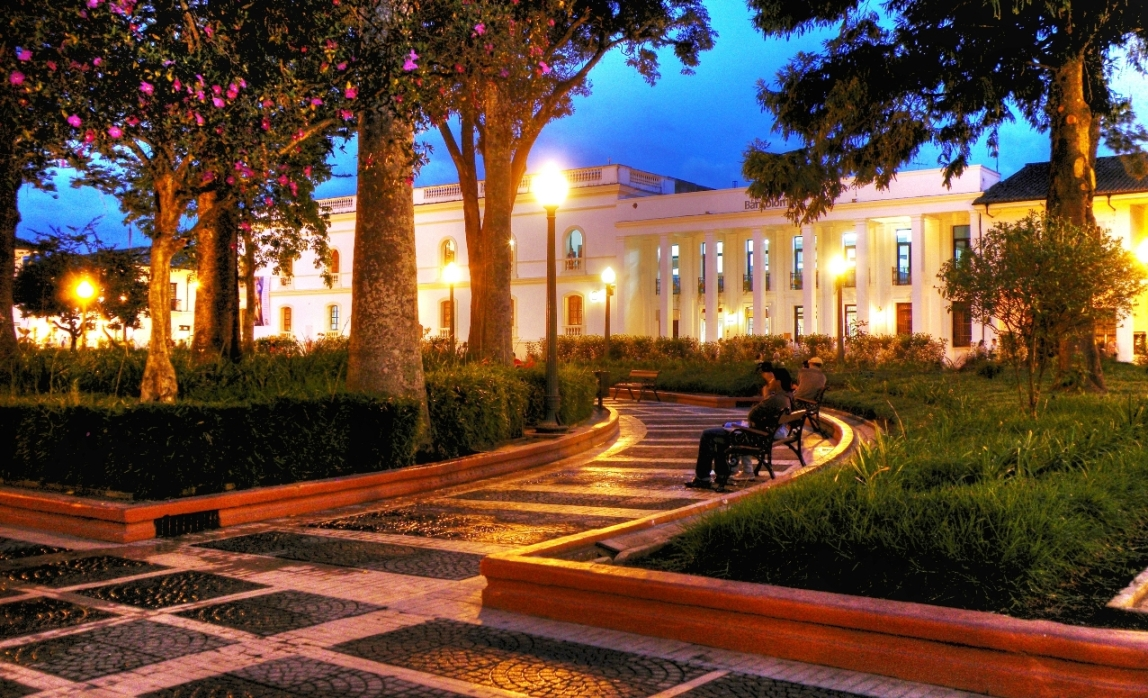
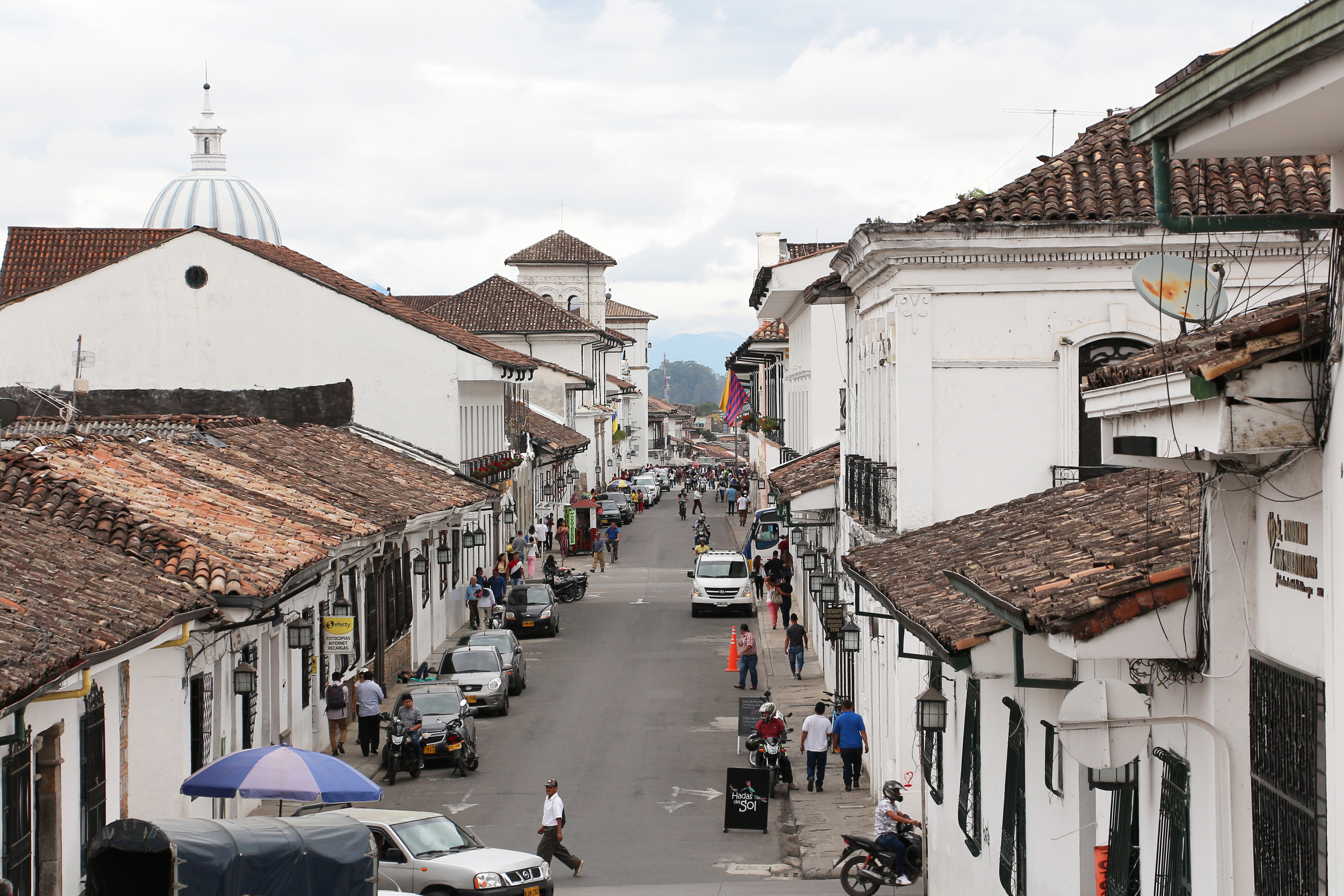
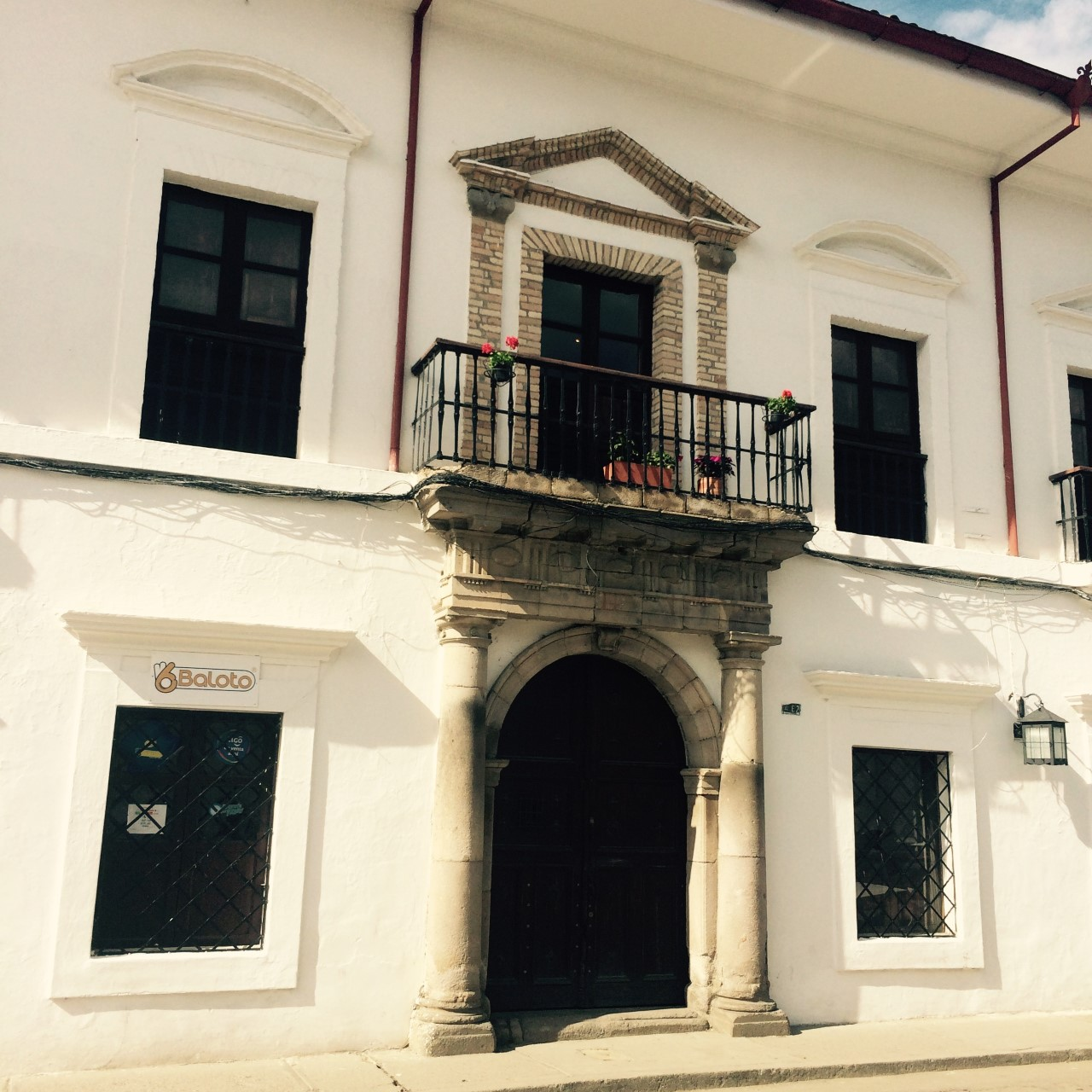
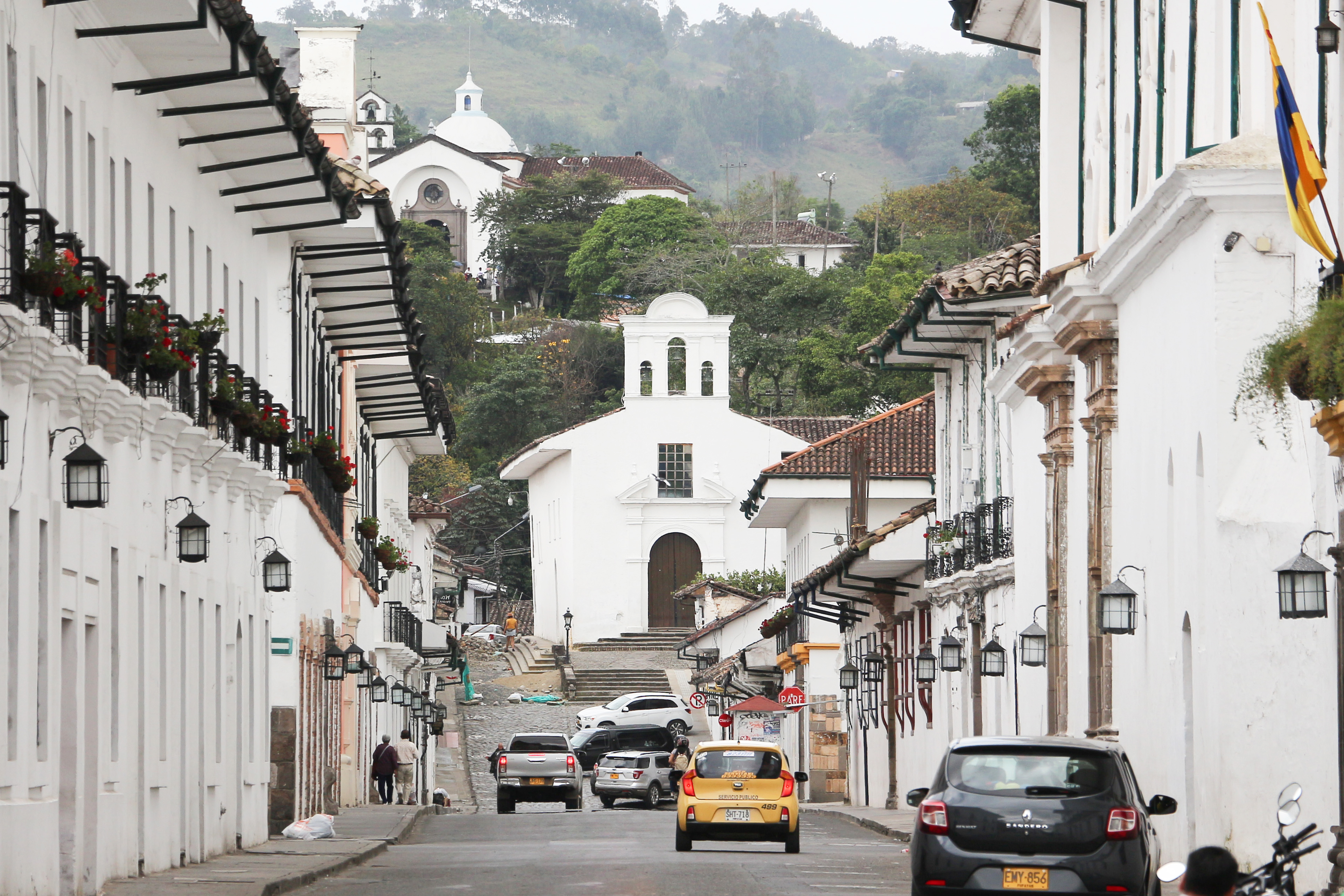
- Aerial view of Popayan Cathedral Basilica of Our Lady of the Assumption Humilladero Bridge Caldas Park Historic Center of Popayán Museum of religious art Ermita de Jesus de Nazareno

- Flag Coat of arms
- Nickname: La ciudad blanca (The White City)
- Location of the City and municipality of Popayán in the Cauca Department.

- Location in Colombia
- Coordinates: 2°27′15″N 76°36′33″W
- Country: Colombia
- Departamento: Cauca
- Founded: 13 January 1537
- Founder: Sebastián de Belalcázar

Government
  - Mayor: Juan Carlos Muñoz (2024-2027)

Area
  - Municipality and city: 483.11 km^{2} (186.53 sq mi)
  - Urban: 32.23 km^{2} (12.44 sq mi)
- Elevation: 1,760 m (5,770 ft)

Population (2018 census)
  - Municipality and city: 318,059
  - Density: 909.23/km^{2} (2,354.9/sq mi)
  - Urban: 252,570
  - Urban density: 7,836/km^{2} (20,300/sq mi)
  - Metro: 282,561
- Demonym: Payanés
- Time zone: UTC-05:00 (COT)
- Postal code: 190001-19
- Area code: +2
- Website: Official website

Popayán (Spanish pronunciation: [popaˈʝan]) is the capital of the Colombian department of Cauca. It is located in the Pubenza Valley in southwestern Colombia between the Western Mountain Range and Central Mountain Range. The municipality has a population of 318,059, an area of 483 km^{2}, is located 1760 meters above sea level, and has an average temperature of 18 °C.

The town is well known for its colonial architecture and its contributions to Colombian cultural and political life. It is also known as the "white city" due to the color of most of the colonial buildings in the city center, where several churches are located, such as San Francisco, San José, Belén, Santo Domingo, San Agustín, and the Catedral Basílica Nuestra Señora de la Asunción, known locally as "La Catedral". The city's cathedral was home to the Crown of the Andes, a 16th-century Marianist devotional object featuring emeralds taken from the captured Inca Emperor Atahualpa. It was sold to finance local health care institutions.

Popayán has been home to seventeen Colombian presidents, as well as noted poets, painters, and composers. The University of Cauca (est. 1827), one of Colombia's oldest and most distinguished institutions of higher education, is located here, so Popayán is also known as the "University City". Nearby is Puracé National Natural Park. The nearest large city is Cali, in the Valle del Cauca Department, north of Cauca.

Much of the city's original splendor was destroyed on 31 March 1983, when an earthquake toppled many buildings. Though many were rebuilt and repaired, the heart of the city still has ruins and empty lots. In 2005, Popayán was declared by the UNESCO as the first city of gastronomy because of its variety and meaning to the intangible patrimony of Colombian culture. The culinary history of the Cauca Department was chosen because it maintains traditional food preparation methods that have been passed down orally for generations. In 2009, UNESCO also declared the Semana Santa processions during Easter Week a Masterpiece of the Oral and Intangible Patrimony of Humanity.

== Etymology ==
The word Popayán comes from an indigenous language. There are different theories about the origin of this word, one claims it means: Po: "Two"; pa: "reed"; yan: "village", or; "Two villages with reed roofs". Another theory says that the word Popayán comes from the name of the indigenous cacique, called Payán, who used to live around Eme Hill, nowadays known as Las Tres Cruces Hill. Yet another theory says that according to the historian Arcecio Aragón, the origin of the word Popayán is "Pampayán" from the Quechua language: pampa (valley) and yan (river), thus, the "valley of the river", where "river" refers to the Cauca River.

== History ==
=== Pre-hispanic period ===
No records exist of the pre-Hispanic history of the indigenous village of Popayán. The city is the home of an ancient pre-Hispanic pyramid known as El Morro del Tulcán, already abandoned when the first Spanish arrived. Analyses of dental samples have revealed that individuals buried there probably belonged to the upper class of their society.

=== Belalcazar's conquest ===
On 13 January 1537 the Spanish conquistador Sebastián de Belalcázar arrived in Popayán. In the 16th and 17th centuries, Popayán was administered by an appointed governor under the jurisdiction of the Royal Audience of Quito, part of the Viceroyalty of Peru.

=== Viceroyalty of Peru and Viceroyalty of New Granada ===
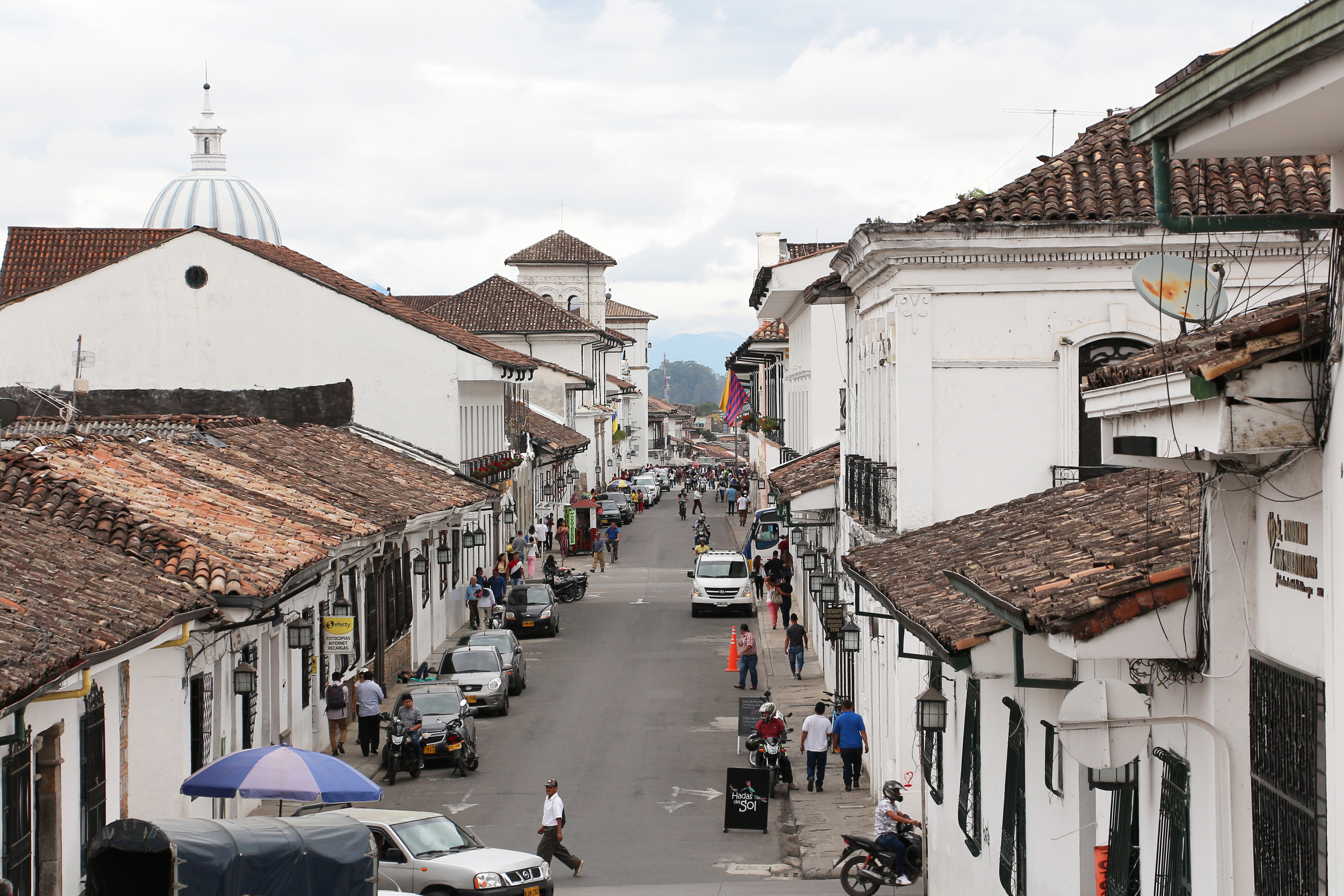
Popayán downtown

Popayán was a very important city due to its location between Lima, Quito and Cartagena. Even after the discovery of the Pacific Ocean, Popayán remained a transfer point for gold and other riches going to Cartagena on their way to Spain. Popayán also served as a colonial mine, and produced various denominations of gold escudo coins and silver reales from 1760 through 1819; it continued producing coinage for the new Republic of Colombia after 1826.

Popayán has been destroyed by several earthquakes. The most recent and destructive lasted eighteen seconds and occurred on 31 March 1983. The reconstruction of the city took more than ten years and today it is still possible to see some lots that have not been rebuilt. The first earthquake seismic design code was established in Colombia as a consequence of this earthquake.

=== Historical city center ===
Popayán's historic downtown includes examples of baroque architecture which has been preserved for more than four centuries. The cobblestone streets were almost all paved in 1937; however, a few projects currently seek to recover the old city's original look.

== Places of interest ==
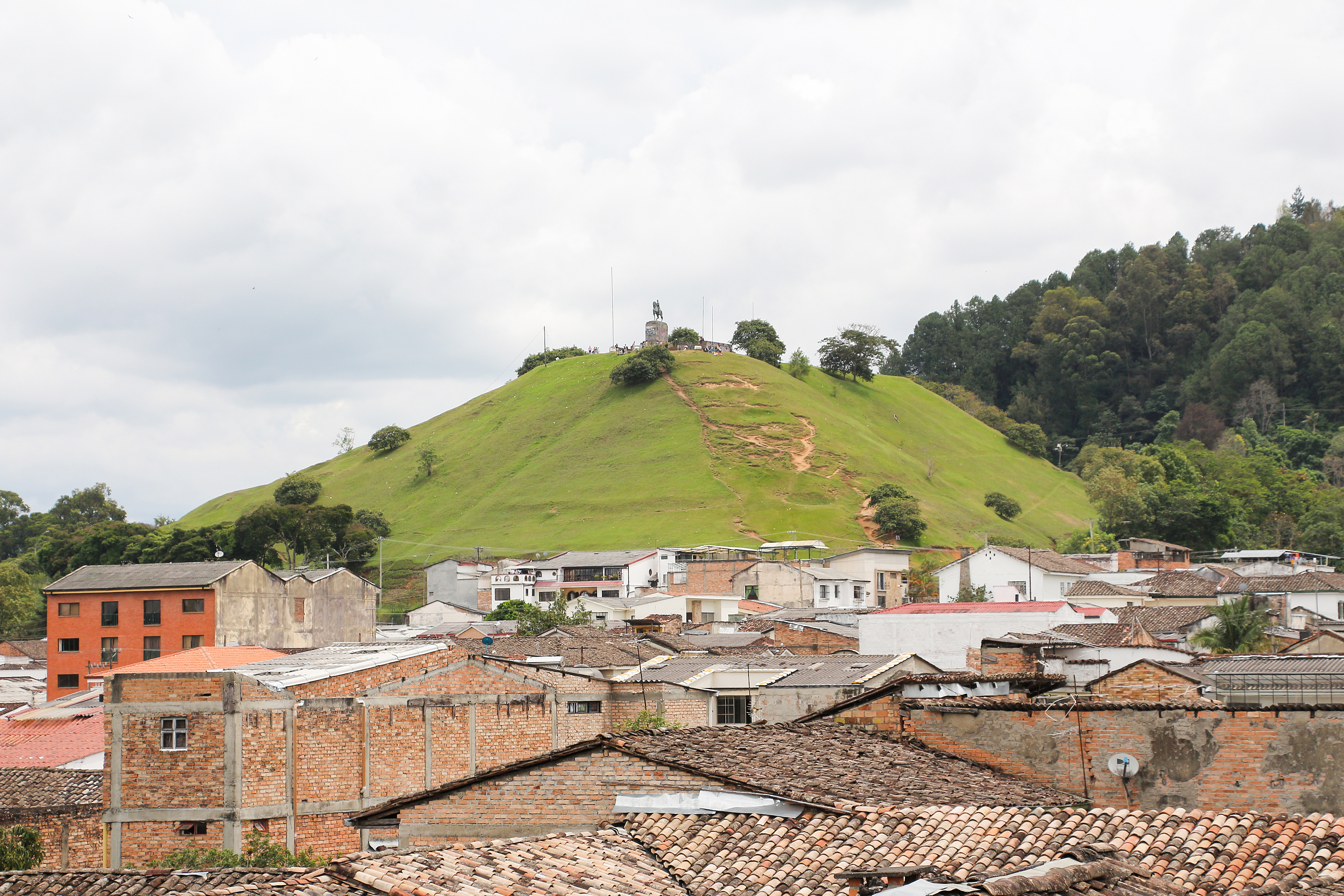
El Morro, in the background

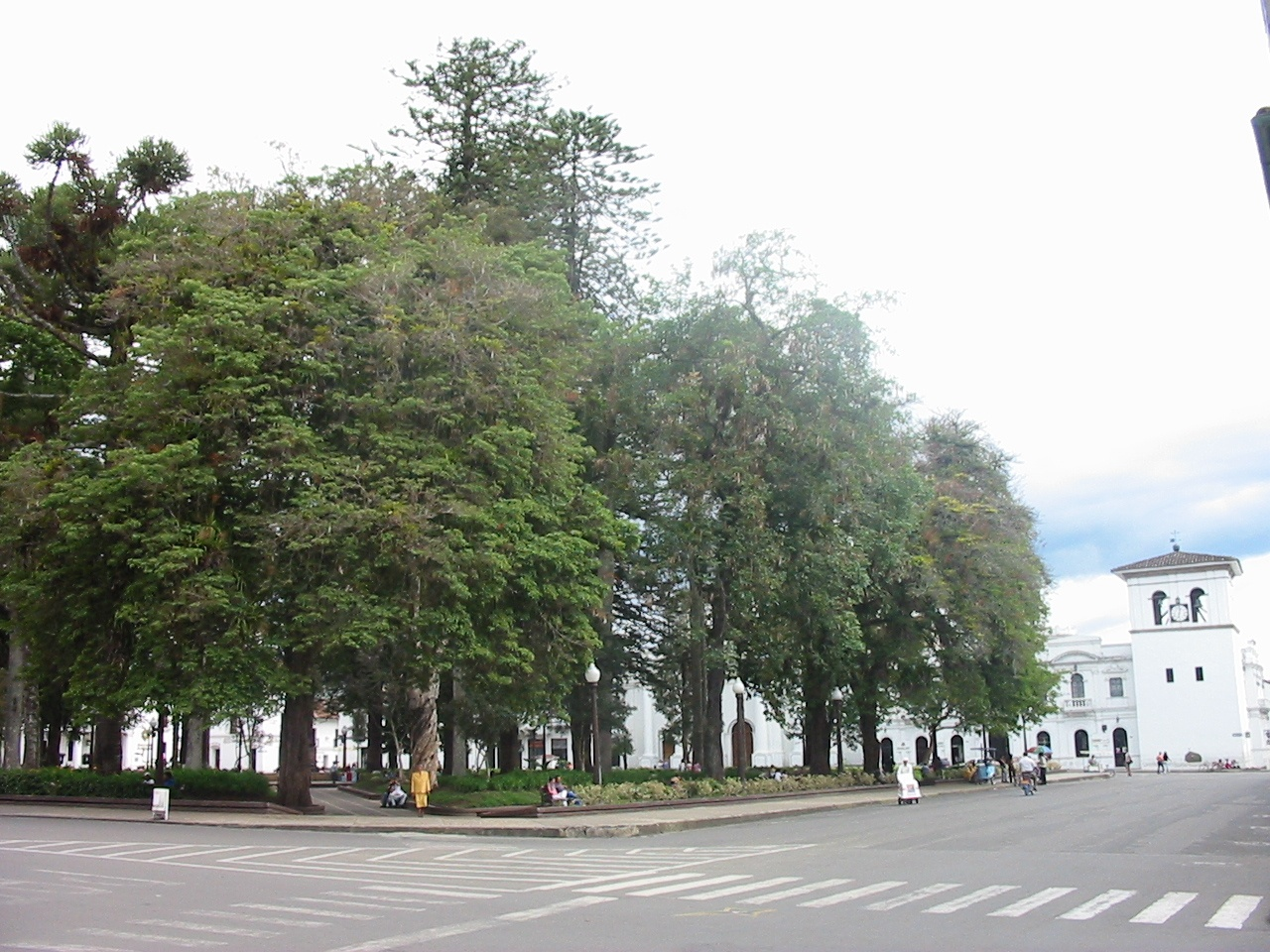
Caldas Park

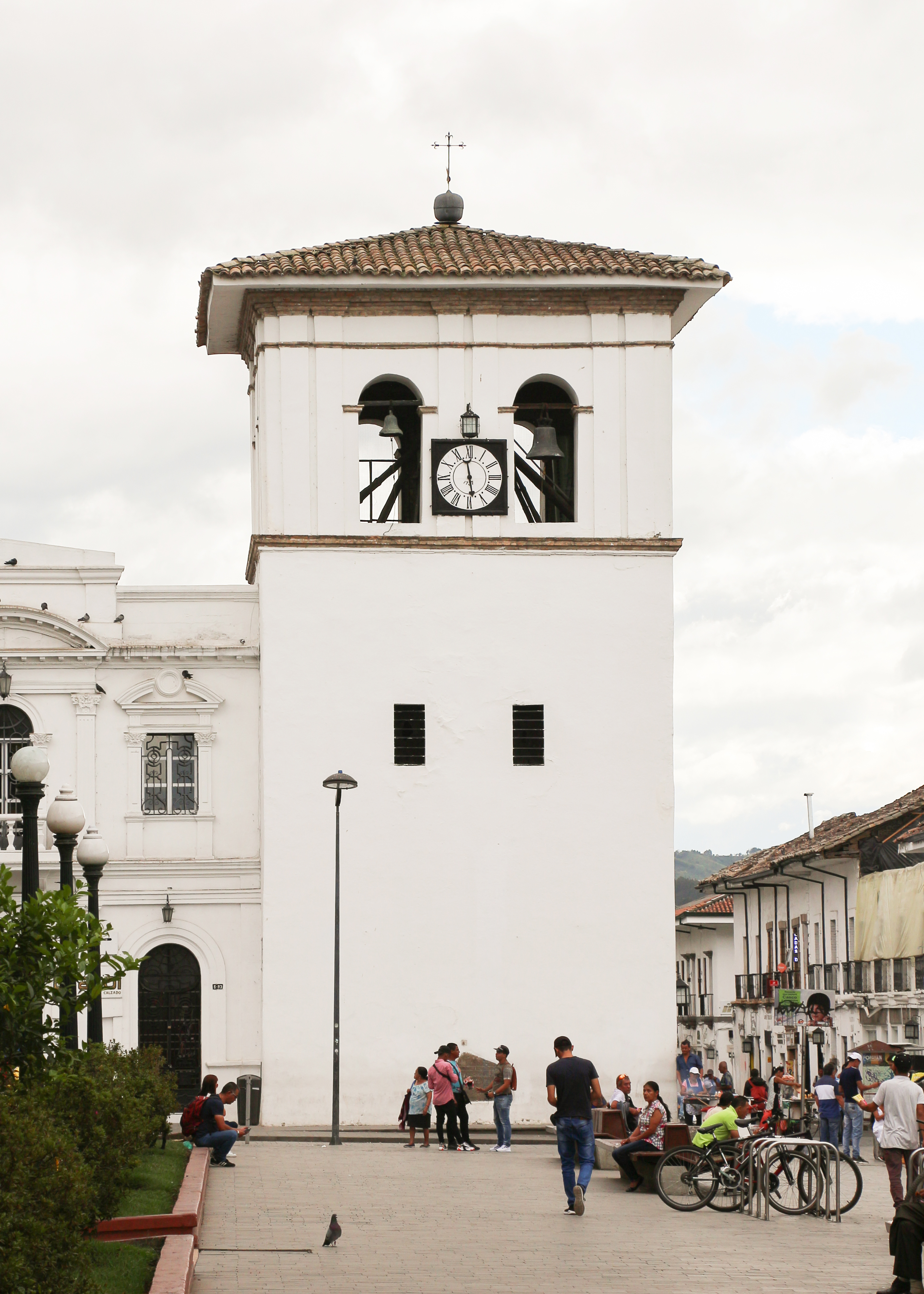
Clock Tower

=== El Morro del tulcán ===
El morro del tulcán is the main archaeological site of Popayán. It consists of a truncated pyramid built between 500 and 1600 A.C., a period known as late chiefdom societies. To commemorate the 400th anniversary of the city's founding, a monument was erected in 1937 in honor of city founder Sebastián de Belalcázar, with an equestrian statue by Spanish artist Victorio Macho.

=== Francisco José de Caldas Auditorium ===
Better known as the Paraninfo, this imposing mid-18th-century building was part of the Dominican order monastery until 1826. It was first built with a mud and straw roof, then reinforced over the years with rammed earth and tile. In 1827 Simón Bolivar declared it a property with historic heritage value, when it was already a two steps hose in front of the Santo Domingo plaza. The last great governor of Cauca, Don Miguel de Arroyo Hurtado, made more renovations and reforms that gave it the most current look. When the building was given to the University of Cauca in the early twentieth century, several changes and additional extensions were made, which recovered all the original spaces.

=== Caldas Park ===
This park was born at the same time as Popayán in 1537, when the track in grid generated around religious, governmental, and founders buildings. Initially it was a marketplace. In 1538 a trap was placed in the center of the park, where Jorge Robledo and Álvaro Oyón were beheaded. The trap lasted until 1766 when it was replaced by a water faucet, which remained until 1805 when a stone pile was put in its place, but it was removed too in 1910 after the inauguration of the monument to Sabio Caldas, a piece by the French sculptor Raoul Verlet, which has stood there since. A replica of it exists in the Plazoleta de las Nieves in Bogotá. Leafy trees were planted at this time. In May 2007 a proposal by architect Lorenzo Castro aimed to expand the pedestrian zone around the park, and in April 2009 the first phase of the work began.

=== University of Cauca ===
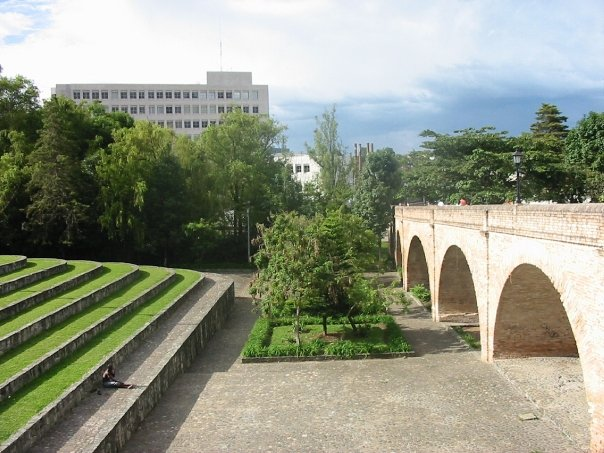
Humilladero Bridge

The university gathers students from around the country. It was founded in 1827 by decree of General Francisco de Paula Santander. Its motto is Posteris Lumen Moriturus Edat. Since the beginning of the twentieth century, the main headquarters have been in the Dominican Order cloister, one of the best examples of religious architecture in the city.

=== Clock tower ===
Called "the nose of Popayán" by Guillermo Valencia, the clock tower is a well-known symbol of the city. It was built next to the cathedral between 1673 and 1682 with 96,000 bricks. The clock, made in England, was placed in 1737. Its mechanism operated by the action of two lead weights which were changed by Antonio Nariño in the Colombia independence dispute in 1814, when metal was required to manufacture ammunition.

After the earthquake of 1983, the clock was restored and put back in operation by the same English company that had manufactured it, but it has since stopped working.

=== Humilladero Bridge ===
This bridge connects the central and northern zones of the city. It was built in 1873 on arches of brick and masonry. The designs were prepared by the Italian friar Fray Serafin Barbetti and a German engineer whose mummified remains are preserved in the Archdiocesan Museum of Religious Art. The bridge crosses a fault between the city center and the El Callejón (now Bolivar) neighborhood which was previously extremely difficult to cross, requiring pedestrians to almost crawl on their knees. Accordingly, the new bridge was named Humilladero. For a long time this bridge was one of the main entrances to the city. The liberating armies crossed it to enter Popayán during the early stages of the struggle for Colombia independence. Its well-planned design and strong construction has allowed the bridge to remain intact through many earthquakes.

=== Calibio ===
This country house was built in the 17th century. On its grounds a battle was fought for the independence of Colombia on January 15, 1814.

== Churches ==
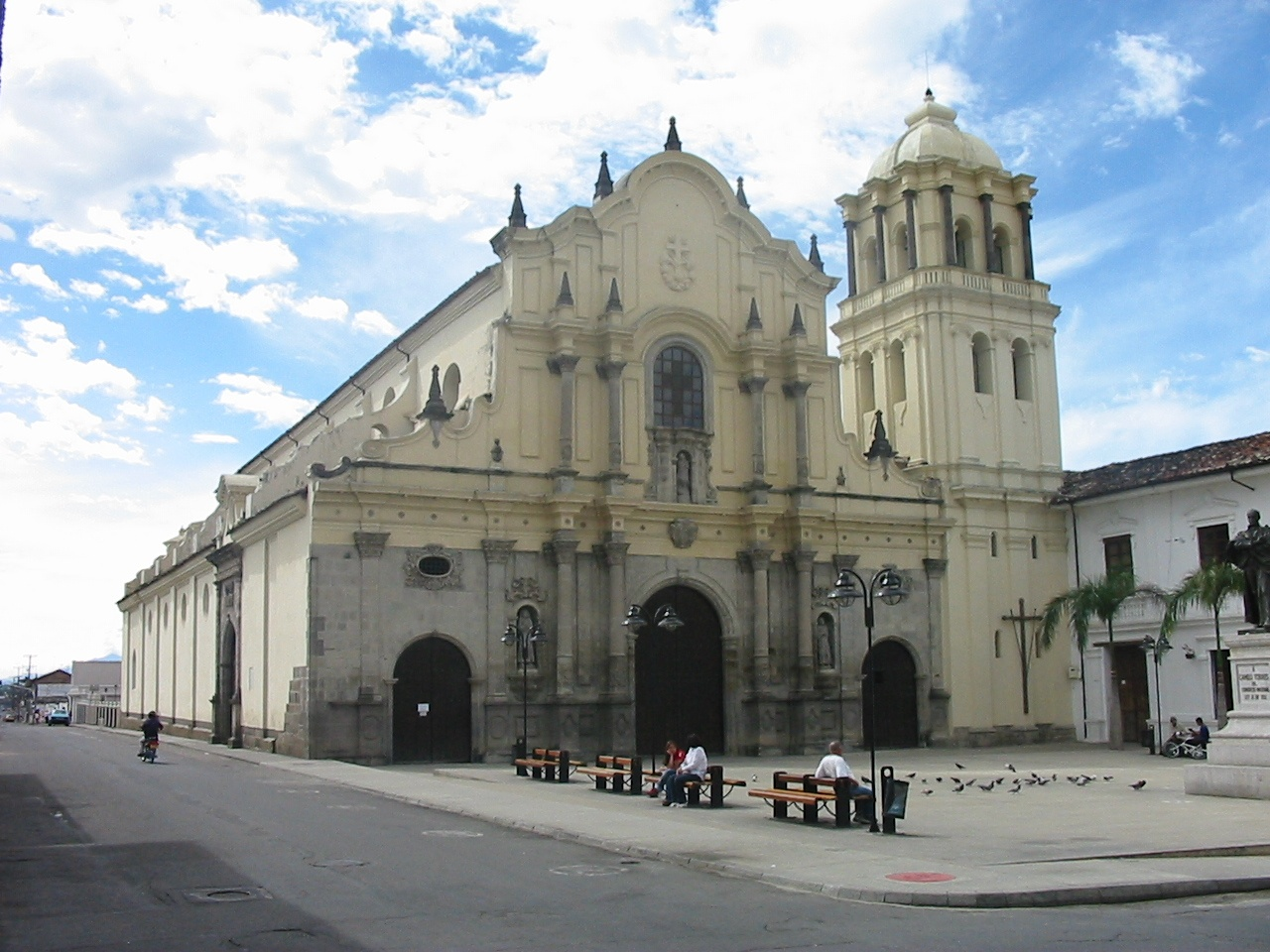
San Francisco Church

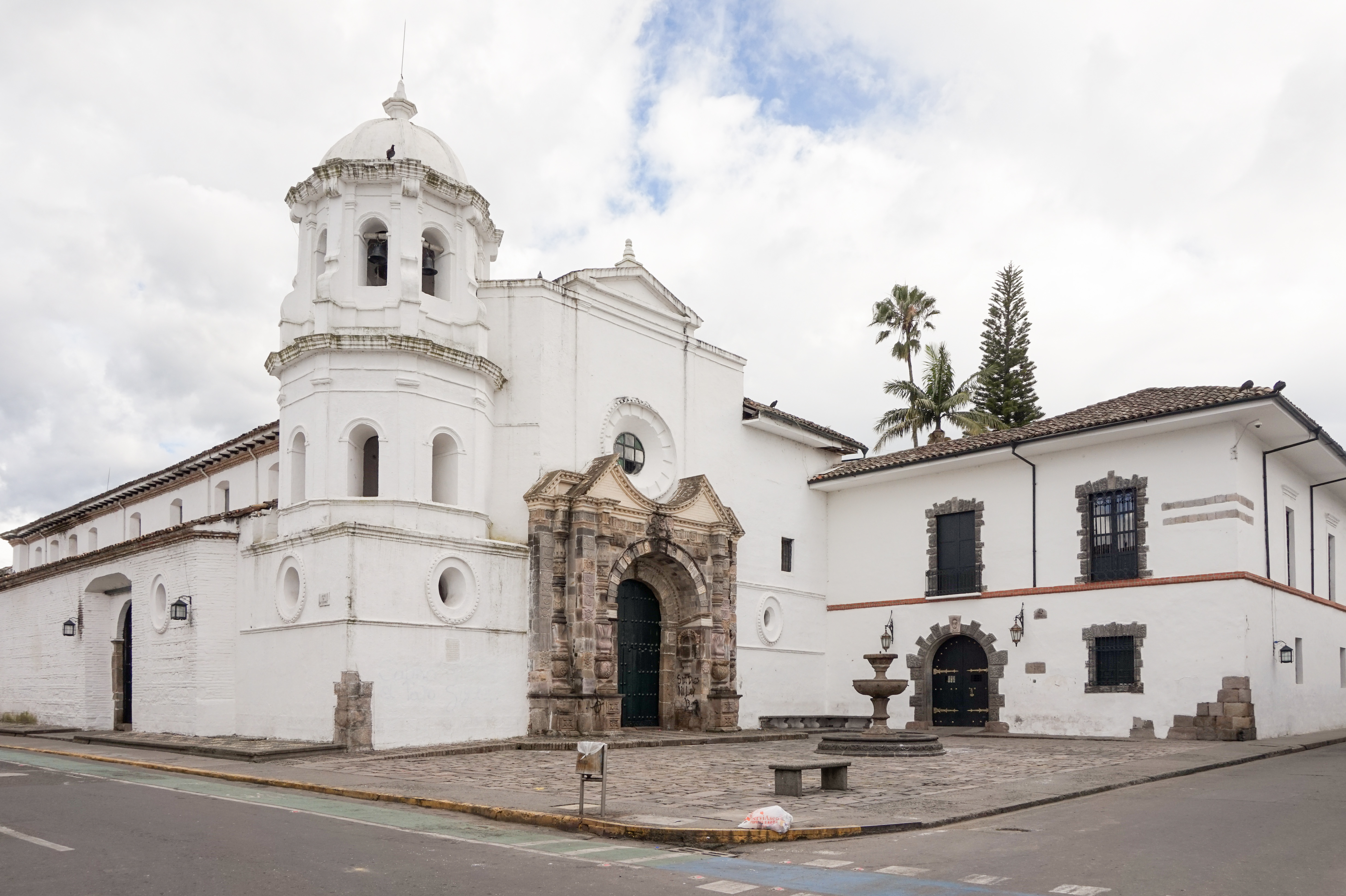
Santo Domingo Church

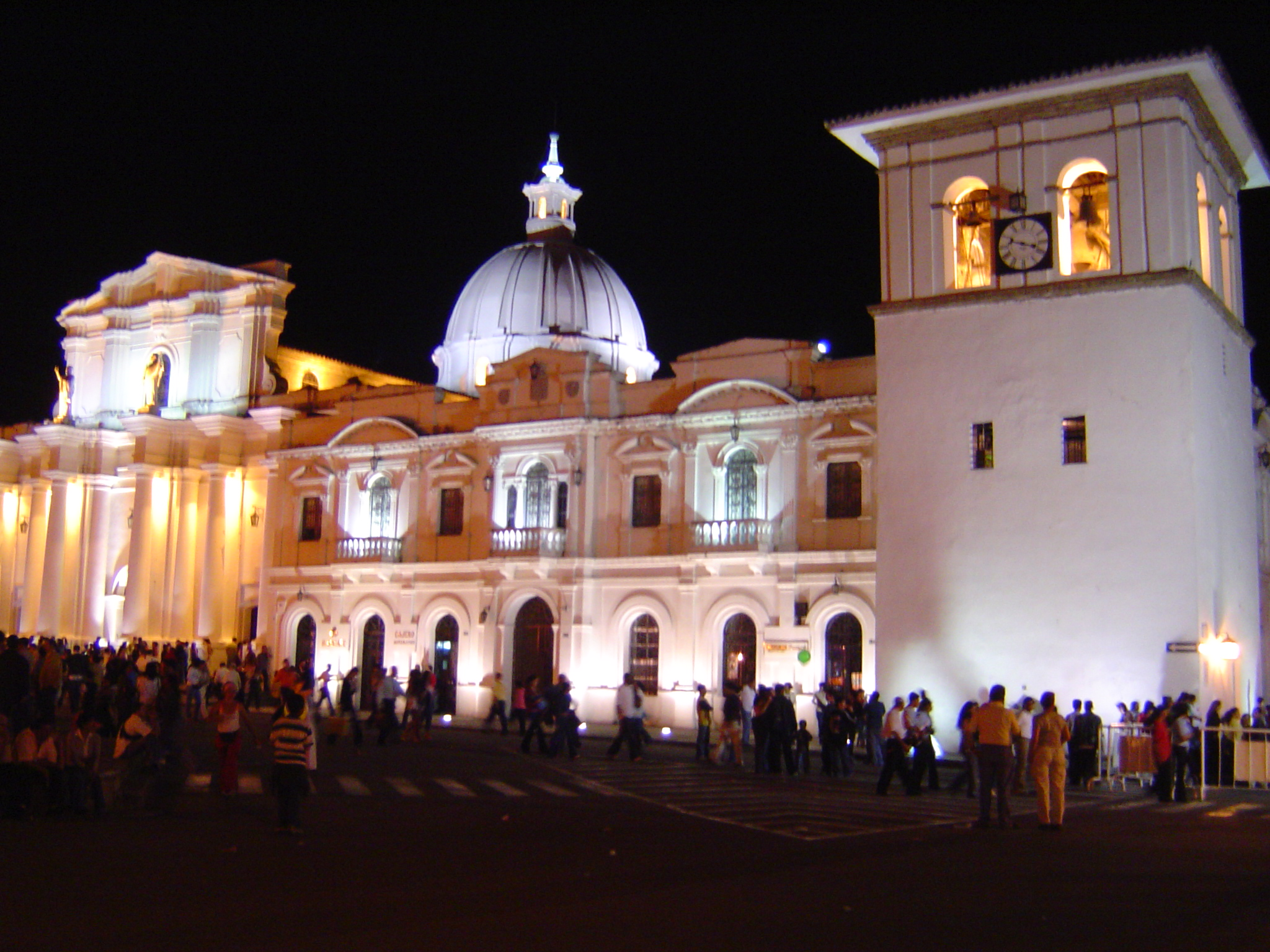
Catedral Basílica Nuestra Señora de la Asunción Church

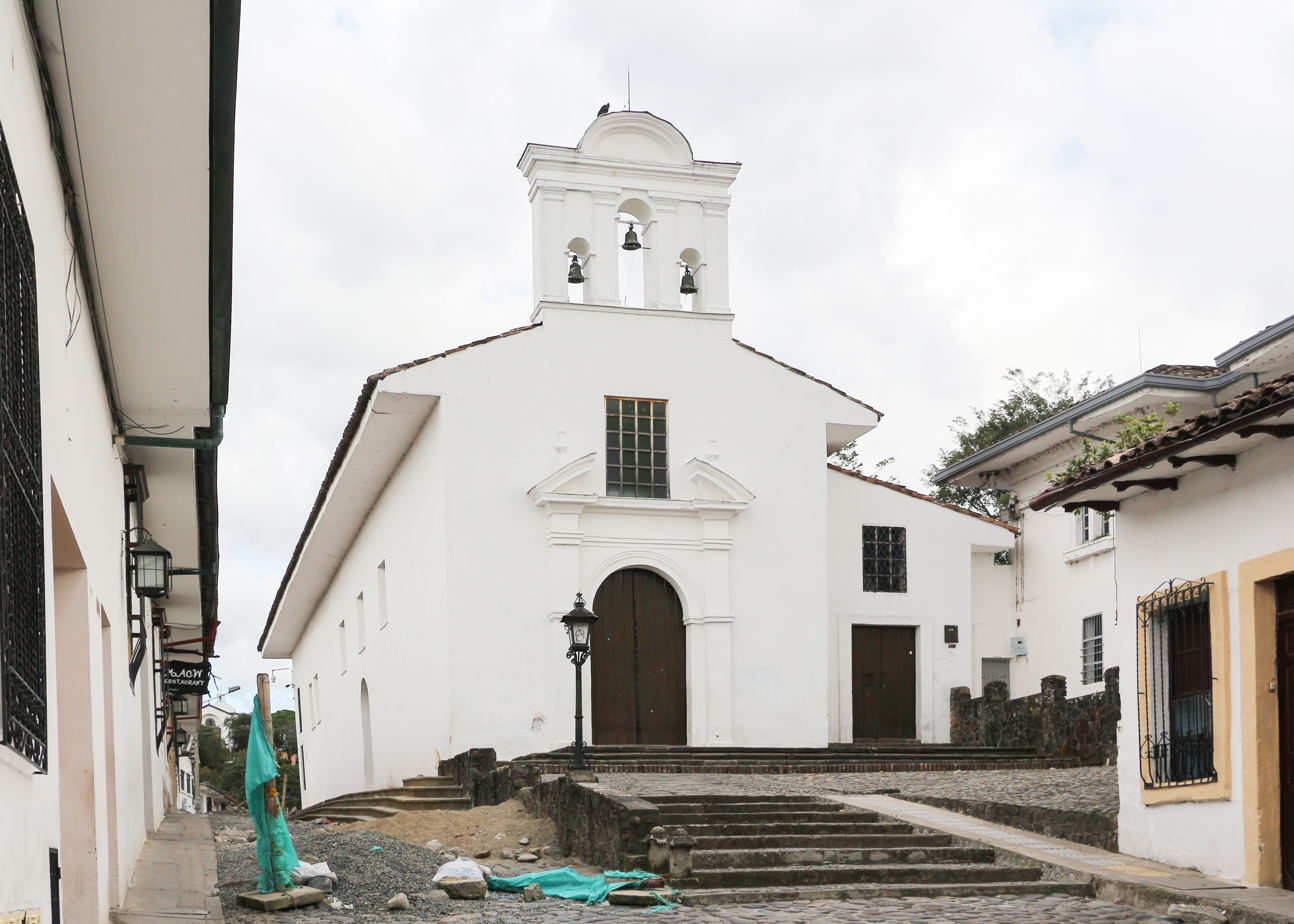
Ermita de Jesús Nazareno Church

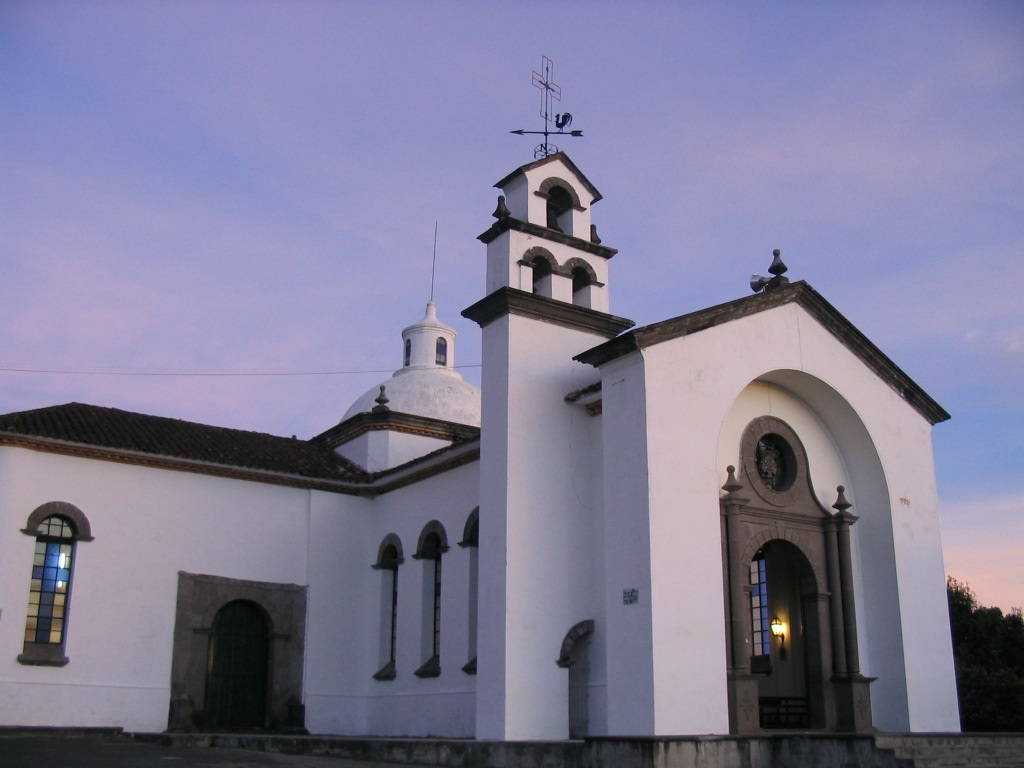
Belén Church

=== San Francisco ===
According to the architect, critic and historian Germain Téllez, the facade of this church is the best example of baroque style in Colombia. In its tower is a bell donated by Don Pedro Agustín de Valencia. This temple is remarkable because of its altar decorations and the proportions of its naves and apse. In San Francisco's square stands a monument to local hero Camilo Torres, whose replica is located in the square of the Colegio Mayor de San Bartolomé in Bogotá.

=== Santo Domingo ===
Late Neogranadino Baroque work, designed by the Spanish architect Antonio Garcia. It has excellent examples of architectures, metal works, and furniture from Quito and Spain schools. His pulpit was designed in the first half of the nineteenth century by an illustrious son of the city, Francisco José de Caldas. Next to this church is the faculty of Law and Political and Social Sciences of the University of Cauca, also in colonial style.

=== San Agustín, church and convent ===
Fray Jeronimo Escobar founded the convent of the Augustinians in the late seventeenth century, whose temple was destroyed in the earthquake in 1736. Then, it was reconstructed thanks to contributions from notable people of the city, but it was necessary to restore it again after the earthquake of 1983. In particular it stands out its altar carved in wood and covered in gold, its expository baroque made in silver and an image of the Lady of Sorrows.

=== La Ermita ===
It is the oldest church in the city and sometimes it served as "Pro Tempore" Cathedral. It dates from 1546 and contains a fine altar discovered after the earthquake of 1983. The principal attraction of this church is the street because its road is made of stones, like old roads in Popayán.

=== Catedral Basílica Nuestra Señora de la Asunción ===
Originally it was a straw hut, but in 1609 it was opened a second cathedral of mud and masonry. The current construction was consecrated in 1906 by Archbishop Manuel Antonio Arboleda, who brings it a magnificent European pipe organ. Its style is the neoclassical, and much of the building was restored because of the earthquake of 1983, including the great dome of 40 meters high, whose restoration was made according to guidelines of the original structure designed by the local artist Adolfo Dueñas.

=== San José ===
It was built in 1702 according to the architectural guidelines of the Jesuits in the American Baroque. It has put up with some changes, for example, the most recent occurred in 1983, when much of the facade which had been covered with paint and lime for at least two centuries, was left on view.

=== Belén Chapel ===
It is located on the hill of Belén, and from the chapel you can see a panoramic view of the city. To arrive to this church, it is necessary to pass through the "quingos", a road of stone steps that allow a nice climb to one of the viewpoints of the city.

Since 1717 this chapel is in charge of the image of Santo Ecce Homo, patron saint of the city. Next to the church there is a cross of quarry stone of 1789, which are attributed to many legends. The original church was completely replaced by a new structure after the earthquake of 1983.

== Museums ==
=== House-Museum Mosquera ===
This house displays a very interesting collection of colonial art and precious memories of the Mosquera family. This house is administrated by Universidad del Cauca. It works in the house that belonged to the Mosquera Arboleda family, a recognized family in the history of Colombia, whose members occupied the highest positions of political power, ecclesiastical, military and diplomatic, simultaneously during much of the nineteenth century. The most important were: Joaquín Mosquera, Tomás Cipriano de Mosquera, Manuel José Mosquera and Manuel Maria Mosquera. The father of them all, Jose Maria Mosquera y Figueroa, was considered by the Liberator Simón Bolívar as the only person he would choose as a second parent.

=== Archdiocesan Museum of Religious Art ===
The old residence of the Arboleda family, was built in the eighteenth century based on plans of the priest Andres Perez Marcelino Arroyo, and it was acquired by the city in 1974 and renovated for its current use in 1979. Their collections are extraordinary examples of religious art, silverware, pictures of the so-called Quito School and paintings of the colonial period. Monstrances of the collection have such value that they are only exposed to the public for a few days during Easter.

=== National Museum Guillermo Valencia ===
It is located in a mansion on the Próceres street, and it is dedicated to the poet Guillermo Valencia, one of the most prominent members of Modernism in Spanish literature. Its numerous rooms are decorated with valuable works of art and artistic pieces, as well as a collection of hundred of selected books, diplomas, medals and awards that Master Valencia received for his distinguished political life and for its fine literary and poetic compositions. In the park located across the street it stands the statue of the poet, made by the Spanish sculptor Victorio Macho. It has too a family cemetery where the remains of several generations of Valencia are resting.

=== Natural History Museum ===
The museum depends on the University of Cauca. It offers an exhibition of animals, like insects, butterflies and birds native to the region, and a collection of pre-Columbian pottery.

== Arts and culture ==
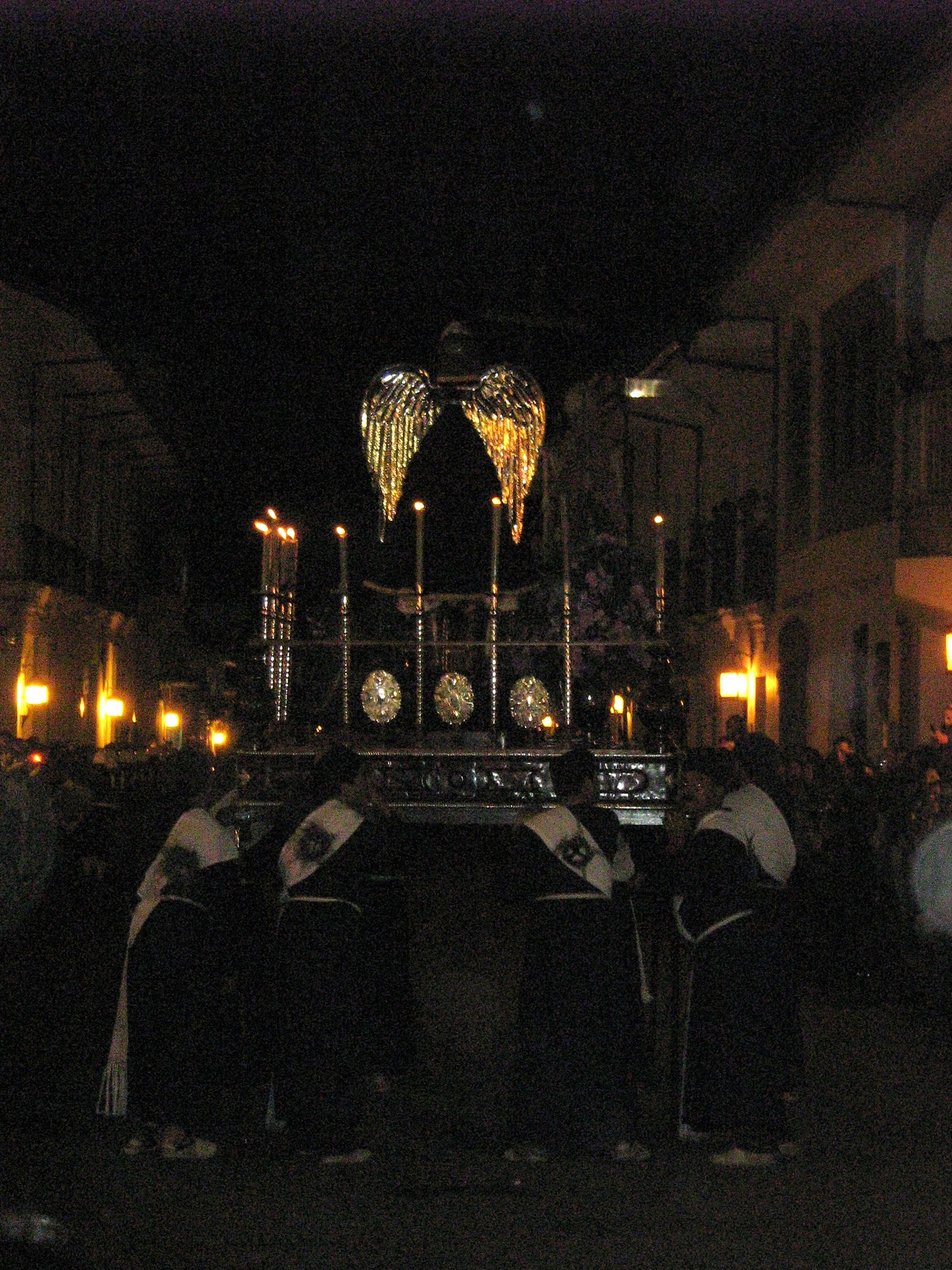
Paso

=== Holy Week ===
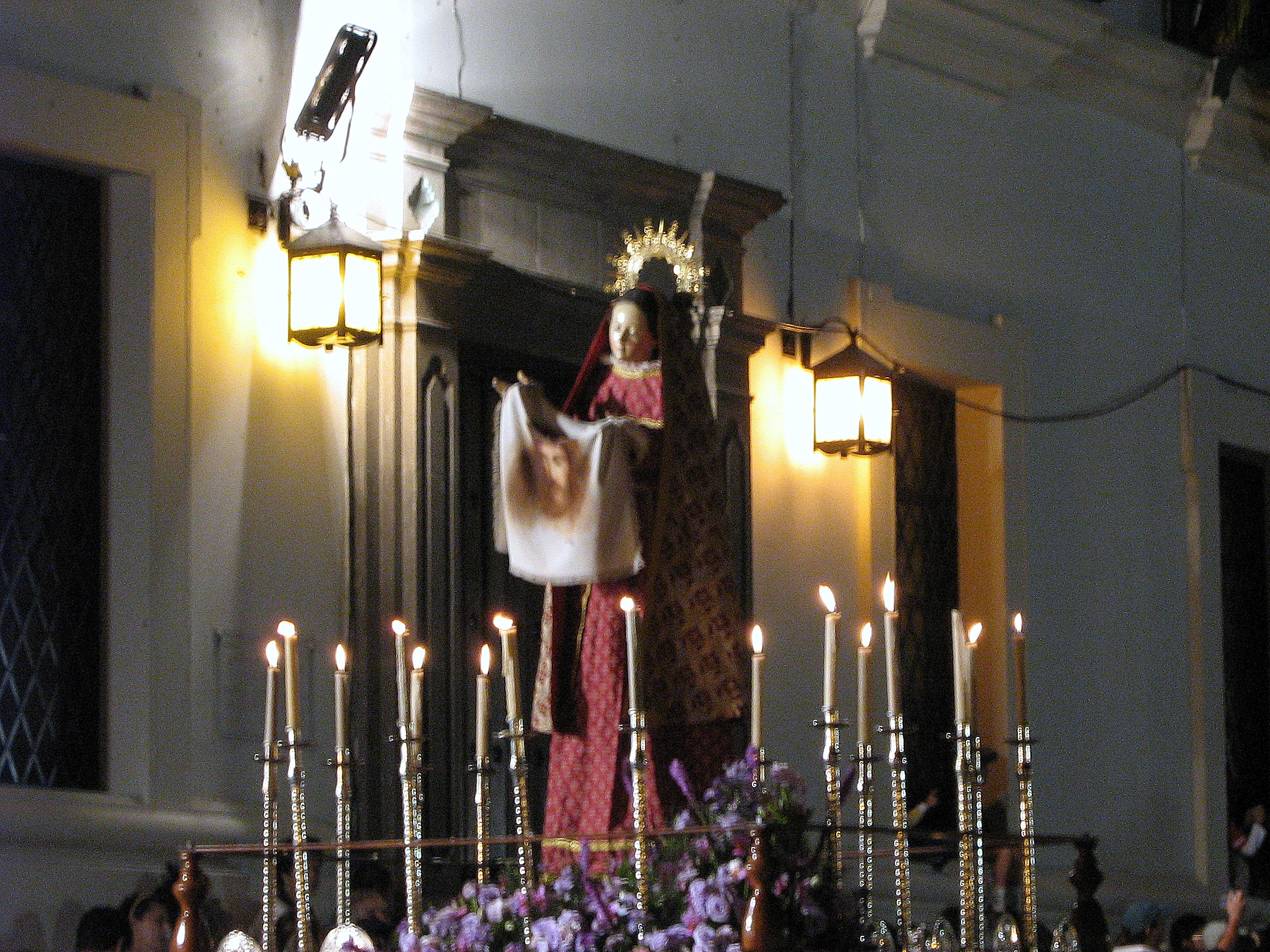
La Verónica

Popayán is widely known for the solemnity of its Holy Week processions, during which it commemorates the passion and death of Jesus Christ. Since roughly the mid-sixteenth century - documents in the historical archives of Popayán mention processions in the year 1558 - sacred processions have taken place each night from Tuesday until Holy Saturday, with ancient religious images paraded through Popayán's historical downtown streets. They are borne on wooden platforms by means of four projecting wooden "bars" at the front and four at the back. These bars rest on the shoulders of the "cargueros", responsible for carrying the platforms.

These processions represent episodes from the Gospels, relating the Passion, crucifixion and death of Jesus Christ. Each representation is called a "Paso". Since the time of the conquest the pasos have been carried through the streets on the shoulders of the traditional 'cargueros' in a route shaped like a cross, which takes in the main churches and temples of the city. Since 2009 the Popayán Holy Week processions have been inscribed in the UNESCO Intangible Cultural Heritage Lists.

During Holy Week, Popayán is also home to the Festival de Música Religiosa (Religious Music Festival), begun in the 1960s by Edmundo Mosquera Troya. This festival presents choirs, soloists and artists from around the world, specialists in sacred music. It is also the tradition at this time of the year to hold art and craft fairs selling handicrafts and commercial products. One of the most important handicrafts samples is Manos de Oro, which displays the works of artists of Colombia.

=== Amo Jesus of Puelenje ===
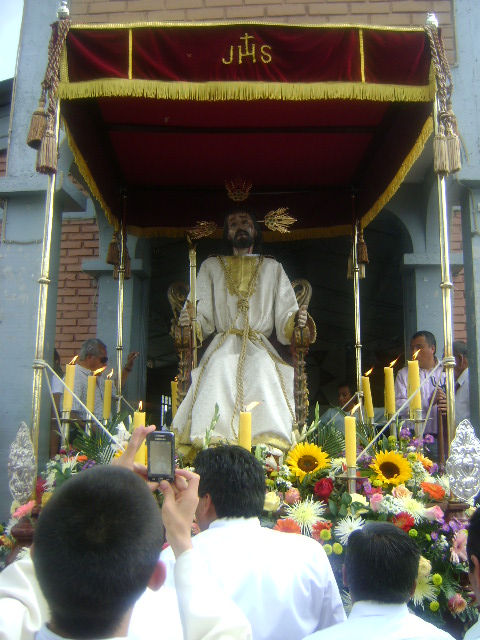
Amo Jesus of Puelenje on the procession

Amo Jesus Nazareno of Puelenje is a Catholic devotional image located in the church of Puelenje, part of the metropolitan area of Popayán, Colombia. Amo Jesus is the patron of the parish of Puelenje. The image is a polychrome baroque wooden sculpture of Jesus Christ carved in the eighteenth century in the style of the Quito school. The image is processed on the Wednesday as part of the expression of popular piety celebrated in Popayán during Holy Week (see above). A festival in honour of Amo Jesus as patron of the parish is celebrated with fireworks, processions, religious ceremonies and cultural events beginning on the 15th day before the last Sunday in August each year.

=== Fiestas de Pubenza ===
Popayán celebrates these festivities at the beginning of the year, from January 5 to 13. These fiestas celebrate the spirit of racial diversity in the country, in the same way as the Carnival of Blacks and Whites, which takes place in the same week, in Pasto, which originally initiated in Popayán during the slavery period as a way of escaping the racial discrimination prevailing at the time.

=== Music ===
It is said that among the original performers there were good music interpreters, excelling in playing the chirimía, that is made up of flutes (transverse cane), guacharacas, drums, castrueras and triángulos, making its appearance in the traditional celebrations of Popayán, especially at Christmas time and at the end of the year.

On the plateau of Popayán, groups of farmers play stringed instruments, composed of three guitars and maracas which have incorporated into their repertoire paseos, merengues, pasillos and boleros in vocal and instrumental form.

=== Gastronomy ===
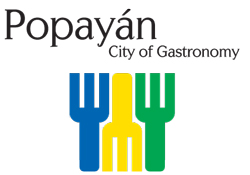
Creative cities network Popayan of the UNESCO

Popayán has been declared a City of Gastronomy by UNESCO, in tribute to its significant tradition of regional cooking. Typical dishes of the city are a legacy of both Spanish and indigenous cultural interaction, integrating components of local origin with fruits brought from Spain.

The National Gastronomy Congress of Popayán has been held each September since 2003, and in 2005 was recognized by UNESCO as a cultural heritage event of the United Nations creative network. The Congress is organized by the Gastronomic Corporation of Popayán, which has presented seven events which have also featured the participation of various countries as special guests: Peru, Brazil, Spain, Chile, Mexico, Italy and France.

Typical dishes

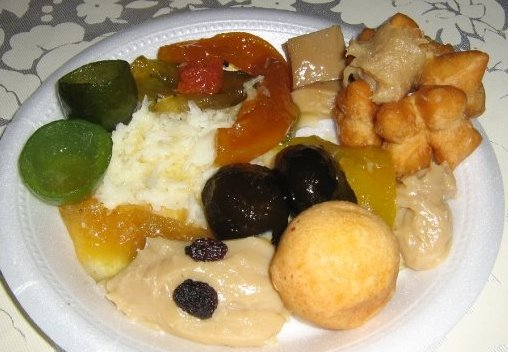
Christmas Eve Dish

- Carantanta: a type of fried corn snack placed in the pot where corn dough has been made.
- Soups: Shaked Broth, Sancocho, tortilla soup, Sango, carantanta soup, wrapped soup, vegetable and pastries soup.
- Dishes: pipián tamales, empanadas de pipián, veal.
- Vegetables: ullucos, corn wraps.
- Sauces and seasonings: pique chile, peanut chile, pineapple chile.
- Cakes: tortilla pie, arracacha cake, white cake, banana cake.
- Breads and cookies: cucas, molletes, pambazos, rosquillas.
- Drinks: toley water.

Christmas Eve plate or dish is very special. Its content is the most complete of Colombia and consists of hojaldra, rosquillas, manjar blanco, dulce cortado, natillas and fig syrups, among others.

=== Film ===
Traditional cinema is represented in the city by the Bolivar Cultural Center, which shows independent films. There is also a theater, the Royal Films multiplex in the Campanario Mall, which has four modern 3D digital cinema screens, and a new theater, Cine Colombia multiplex in the Terra plaza Mall (the newest in the city)

In addition there are several film clubs, many of them located within the University of Cauca. The Cineclub La Tuátara runs every Wednesday in the Comfacauca Institute of Technology auditorium (opened 2001), which has established itself as a cultural space for the city.

A very important innovation is the program of the Radio Universidad del Cauca station 104.1 fm, 'Cinema Radio', on air Saturdays at noon, in which are created thematic cycles. They present news about cinema, 'the seventh art', and also discuss the history of film and audiovisual language. Talking about cinematographic production, there are some people who are working to strengthen the seventh art in the municipality.

=== Born in Popayán ===
- Francisco José de Caldas
- Camilo Torres Tenorio
- Guillermo Valencia
- Guillermo León Valencia
- Manolo Cardona, also known as Manuel Julian Cardona Molano
- Alejandro Falla
- Joaquín Mosquera
- Tomás Cipriano de Mosquera
- José Hilario López
- José María Obando
- Julio Arboleda
- Julián Trujillo Lagarcha
- Ezequiel Hurtado
- Carlos Lemos Simmonds
- Froilan Largacha
- Carlos Albán
- Josefina Valencia de Hubach
- Rafael Maya
- Sergio Arboleda
- Francisco Antonio Ulloa

== Transport ==
Popayan has one commercial airport, Guillermo León Valencia Airport, served by Avianca and by Easyfly.

== Climate ==
The average temperature of 17.8 °C places the city in the warm-temperate zone. Popayán has a subtropical highland climate but as precipitation is high even in the driest month, Köppen defines it as Cfb (in the bordeline of the Af - equatorial climate), without direct relation to the term used. Being in the northern hemisphere, some Mediterranean characteristics are observed such as a much less precipitation during the dry season (locally known as "summer") compared to the wet season (locally known as "winter"), although it still remains quite humid throughout the year.

Climate data for Popayán (Guillermo León Valencia Airport), elevation 1,749 m (5,738 ft), (1991–2020)
Month	Jan	Feb	Mar	Apr	May	Jun	Jul	Aug	Sep	Oct	Nov	Dec	Year
Record high °C (°F)	29.0 (84.2)	29.0 (84.2)	29.4 (84.9)	29.0 (84.2)	29.3 (84.7)	29.2 (84.6)	29.0 (84.2)	30.1 (86.2)	29.6 (85.3)	29.0 (84.2)	28.4 (83.1)	29.2 (84.6)	30.1 (86.2)
Mean daily maximum °C (°F)	25.2 (77.4)	25.3 (77.5)	25.0 (77.0)	25.1 (77.2)	24.9 (76.8)	25.5 (77.9)	25.8 (78.4)	26.4 (79.5)	26.2 (79.2)	25.1 (77.2)	24.4 (75.9)	24.7 (76.5)	25.3 (77.5)
Daily mean °C (°F)	19.6 (67.3)	19.8 (67.6)	19.5 (67.1)	19.5 (67.1)	19.5 (67.1)	19.7 (67.5)	19.9 (67.8)	20.1 (68.2)	19.8 (67.6)	19.2 (66.6)	18.8 (65.8)	19.2 (66.6)	19.6 (67.3)
Mean daily minimum °C (°F)	13.9 (57.0)	14.0 (57.2)	14.3 (57.7)	14.5 (58.1)	14.3 (57.7)	13.5 (56.3)	12.9 (55.2)	12.5 (54.5)	12.9 (55.2)	14.0 (57.2)	14.5 (58.1)	14.4 (57.9)	13.8 (56.8)
Record low °C (°F)	8.2 (46.8)	7.4 (45.3)	6.4 (43.5)	8.8 (47.8)	8.8 (47.8)	6.8 (44.2)	6.8 (44.2)	6.1 (43.0)	6.1 (43.0)	8.8 (47.8)	8.0 (46.4)	8.0 (46.4)	6.1 (43.0)
Average precipitation mm (inches)	210.5 (8.29)	162.6 (6.40)	212.0 (8.35)	205.8 (8.10)	164.3 (6.47)	82.8 (3.26)	53.8 (2.12)	51.4 (2.02)	110.7 (4.36)	264.6 (10.42)	328.6 (12.94)	263.8 (10.39)	2,110.8 (83.10)
Average precipitation days	18	16	20	21	21	14	11	10	15	24	24	23	214
Average relative humidity (%)	79	79	79	81	80	77	72	69	73	79	82	83	78
Mean monthly sunshine hours	155.0	129.9	120.9	108.0	117.8	144.0	173.6	167.4	135.0	114.7	117.0	136.4	1,619.7
Mean daily sunshine hours	5.0	4.6	3.9	3.6	3.8	4.8	5.6	5.4	4.5	3.7	3.9	4.4	4.4
Source: Instituto de Hidrologia Meteorologia y Estudios Ambientales (precipitation, humidity, sun 1981-2010)

== Twin towns – sister cities ==
Popayán is twinned with:

- Caltanissetta, Italy
- Cuenca, Ecuador
- Ibarra, Ecuador
- Loja, Ecuador
- Málaga, Spain
- Santiago de Compostela, Spain

== Gallery ==
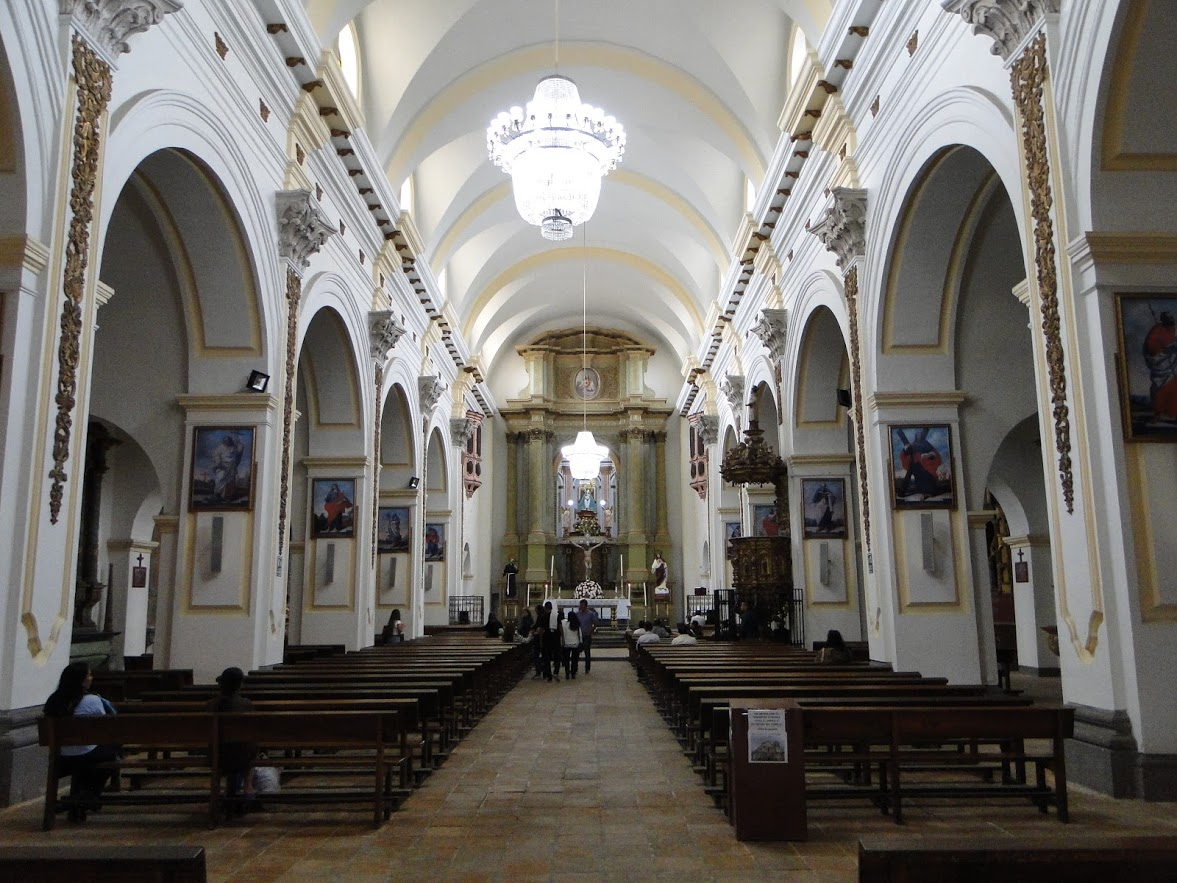
Iglesia de San Francisco (inner view)

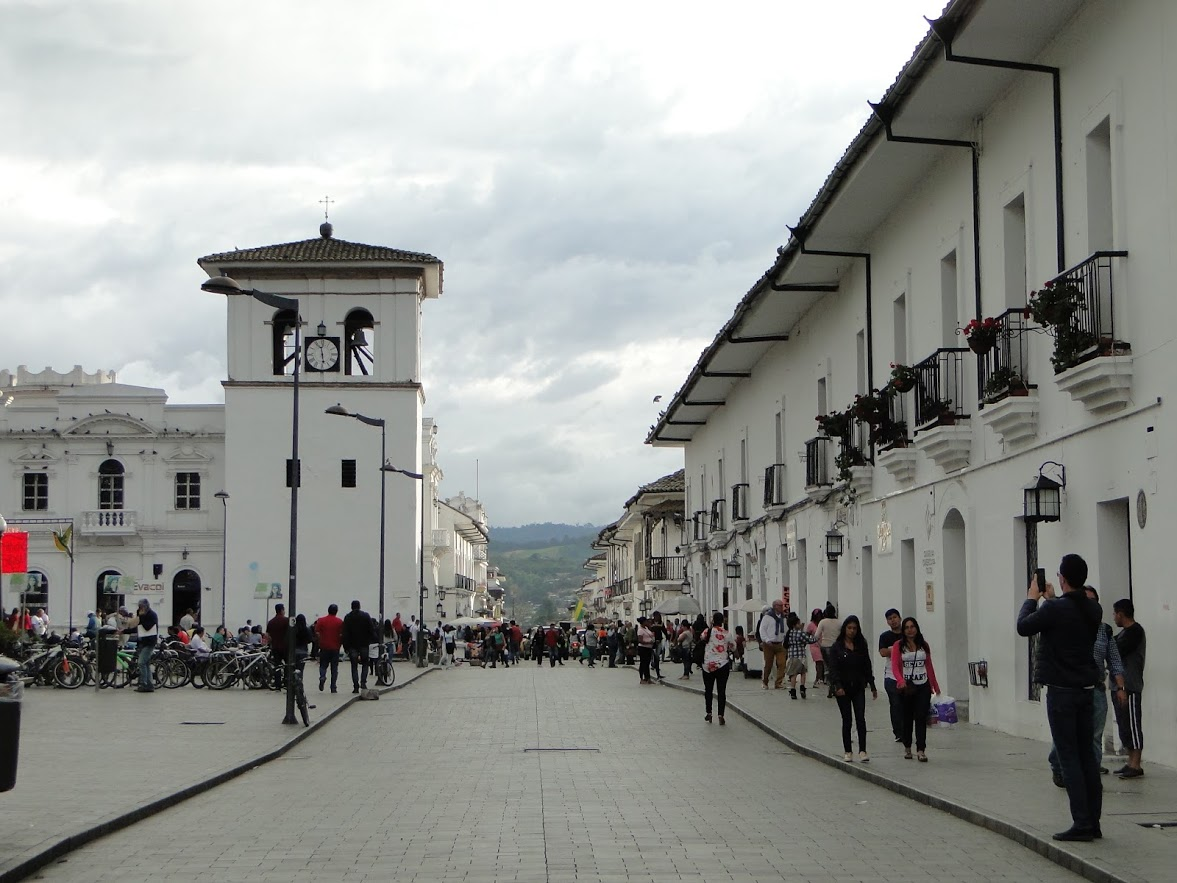
The clock tower

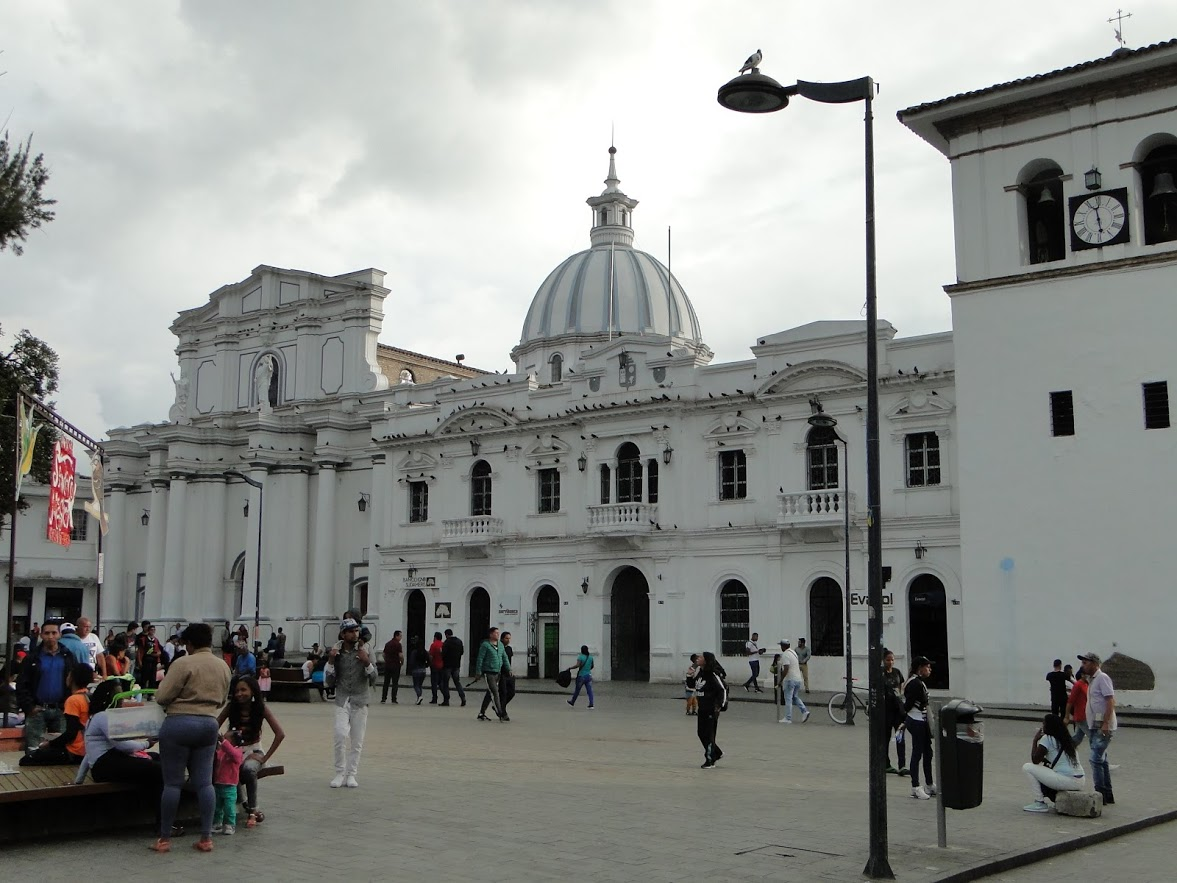
The cathedral

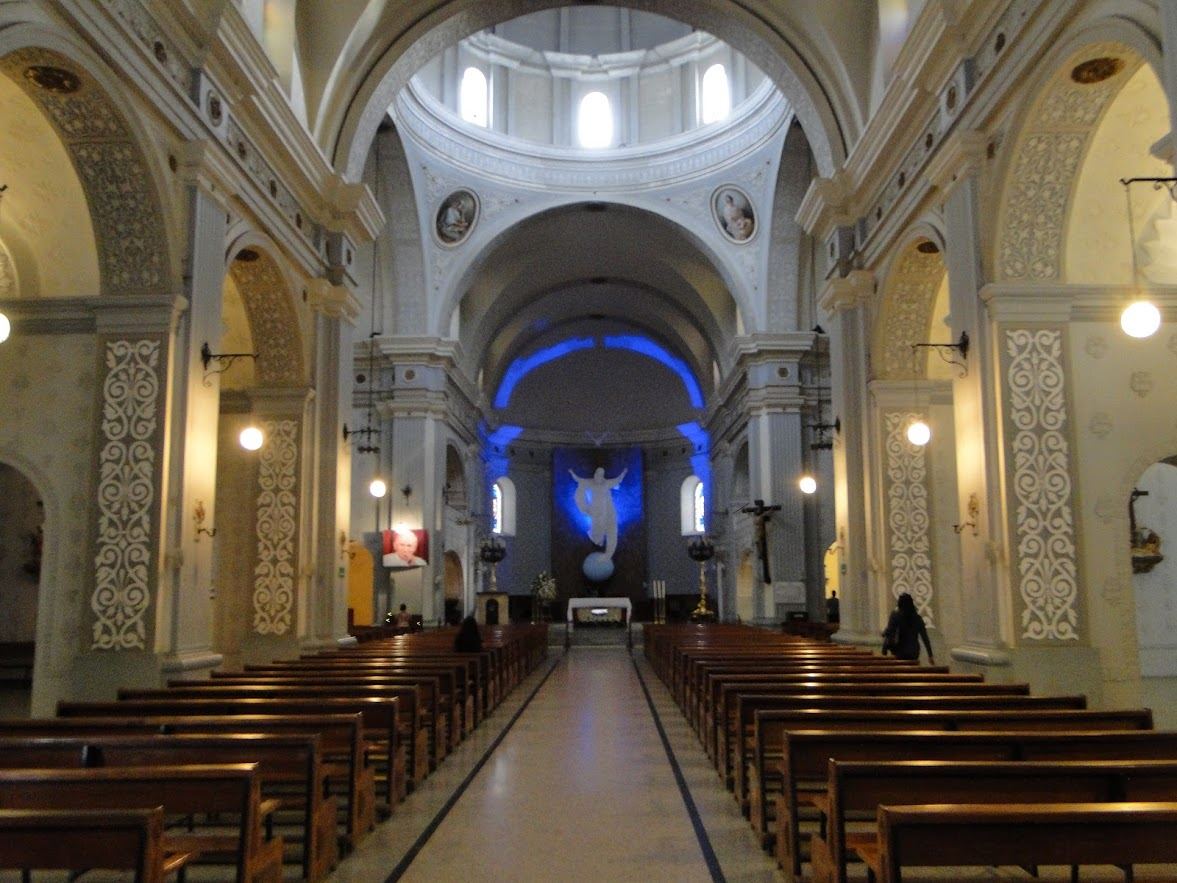
The cathedral (inner view)

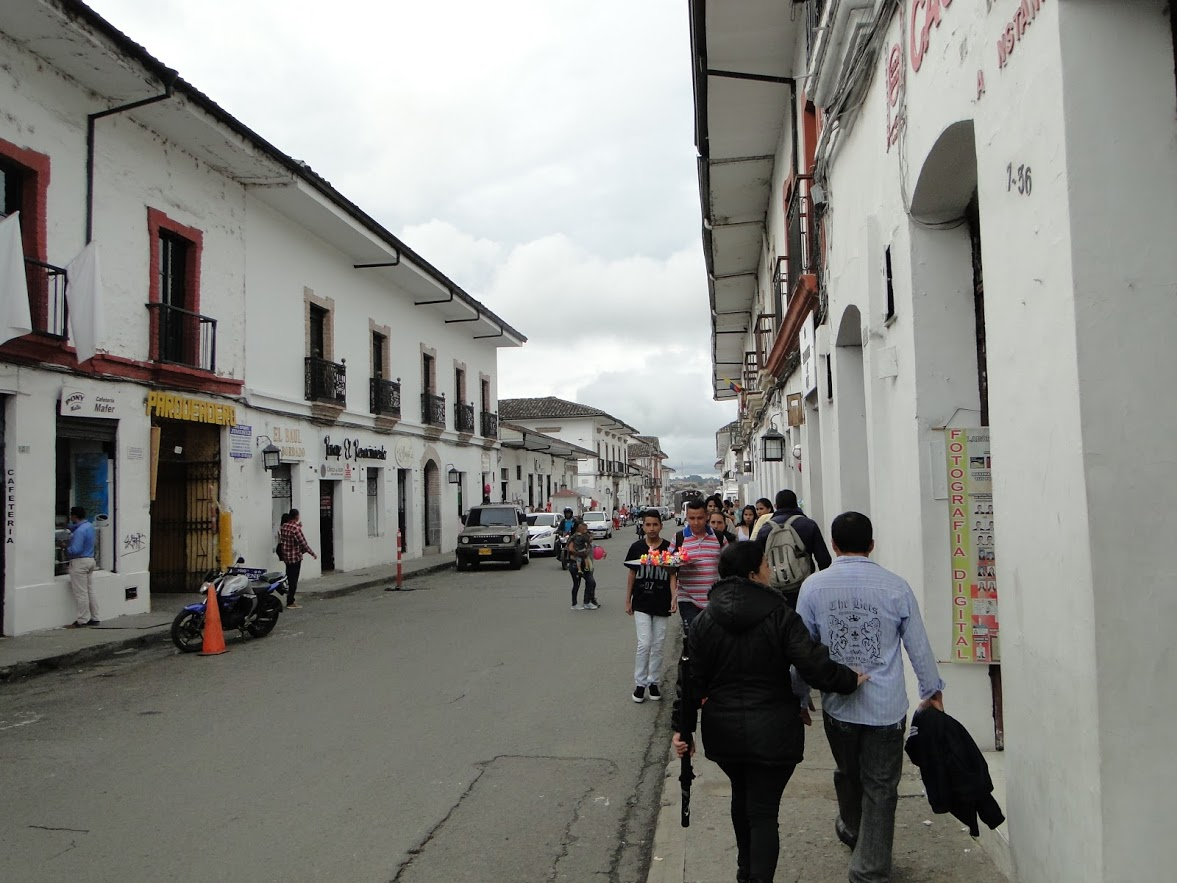
Street view

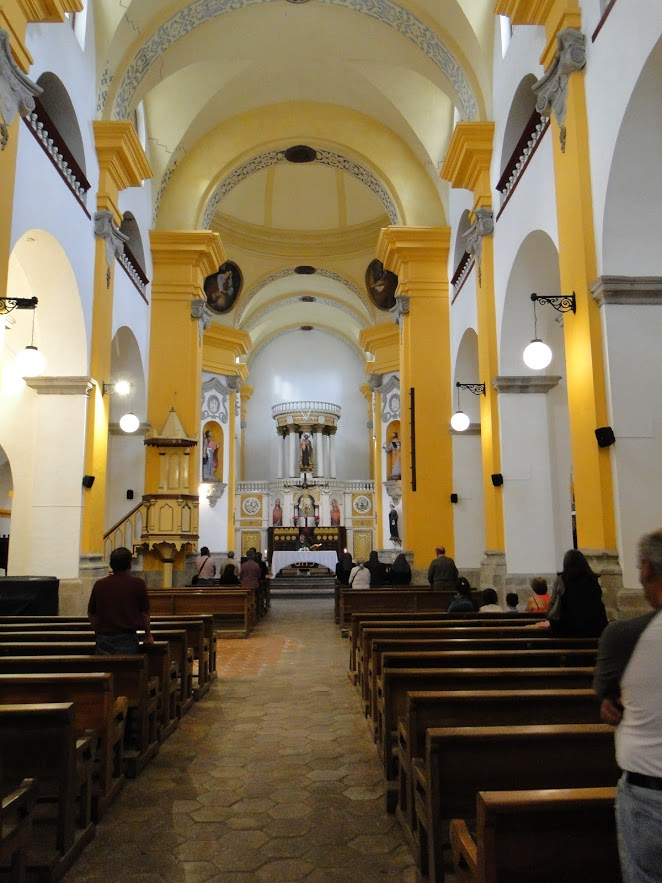
The San Jose church (inner view)

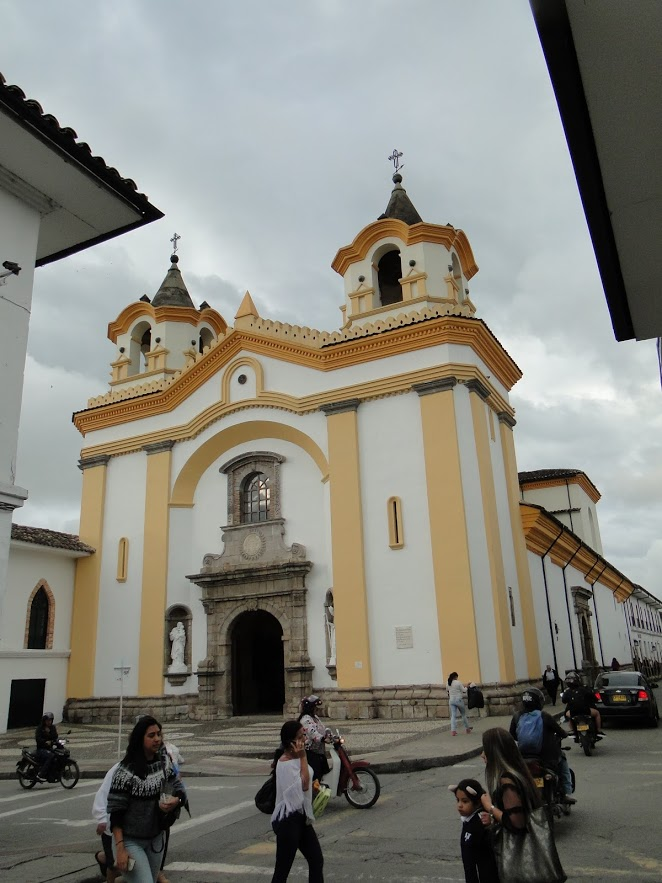
The San Jose church

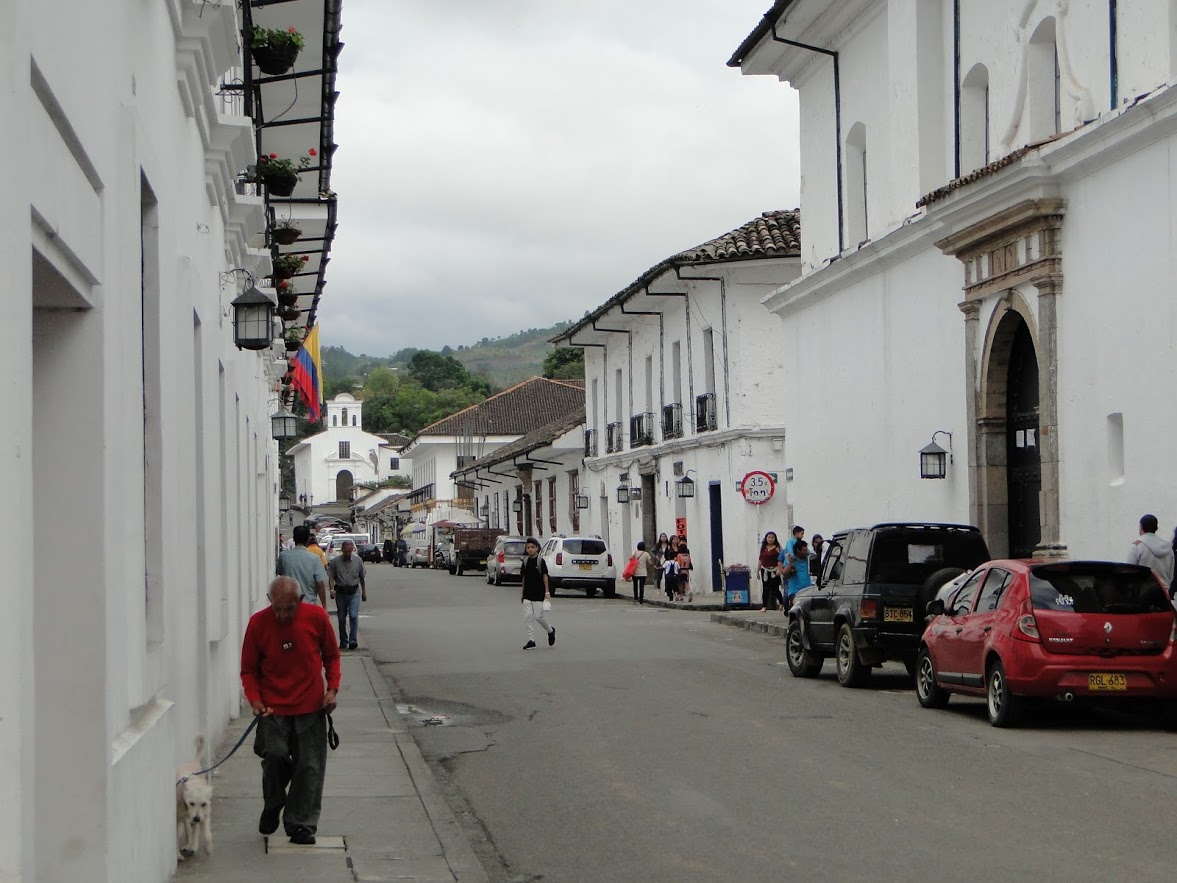
In the city

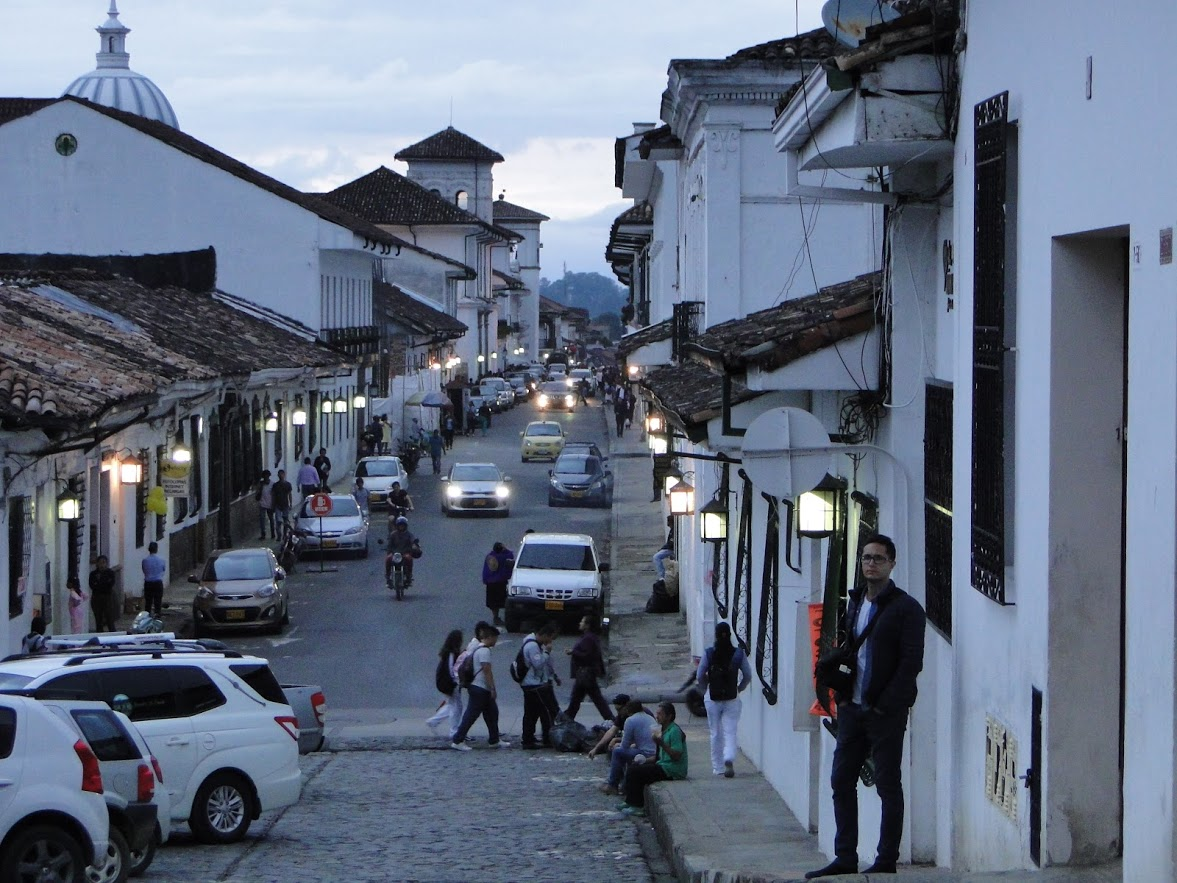
City in the evening

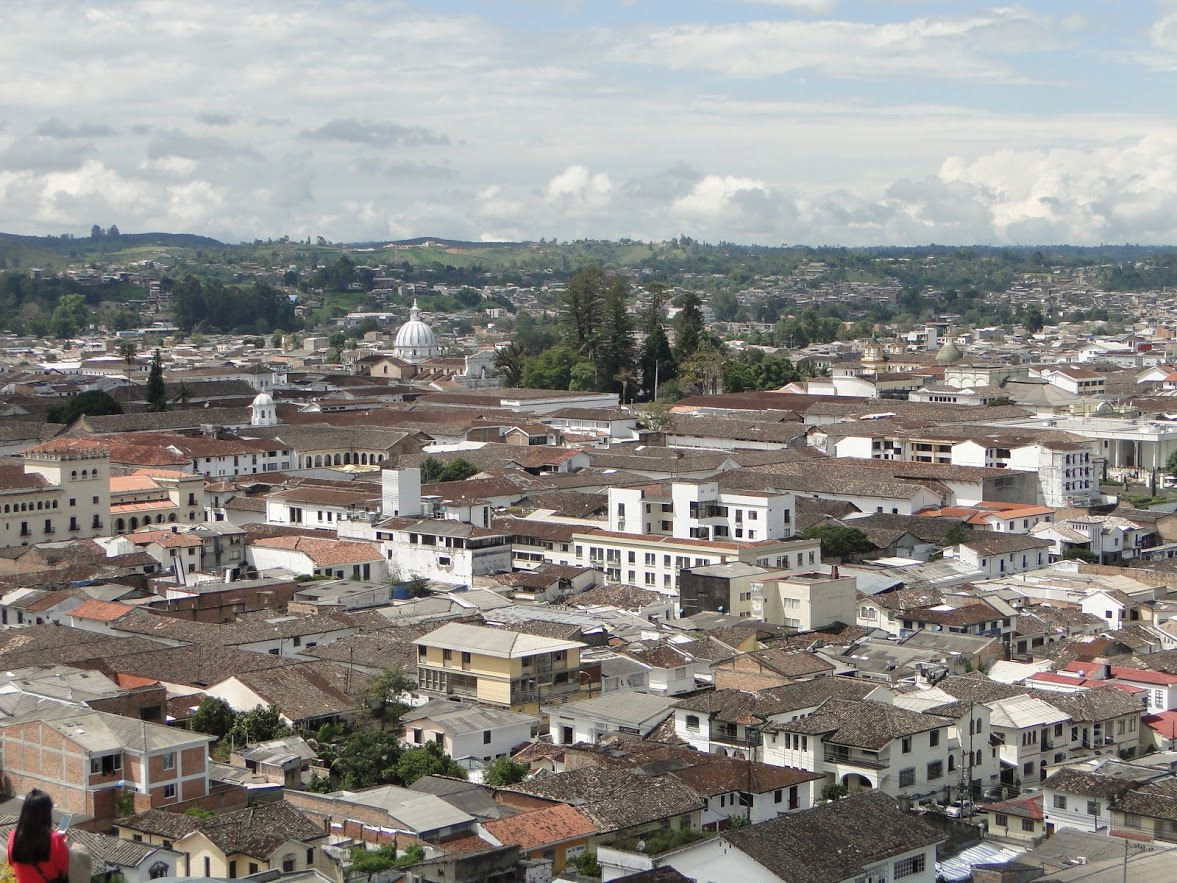
White city

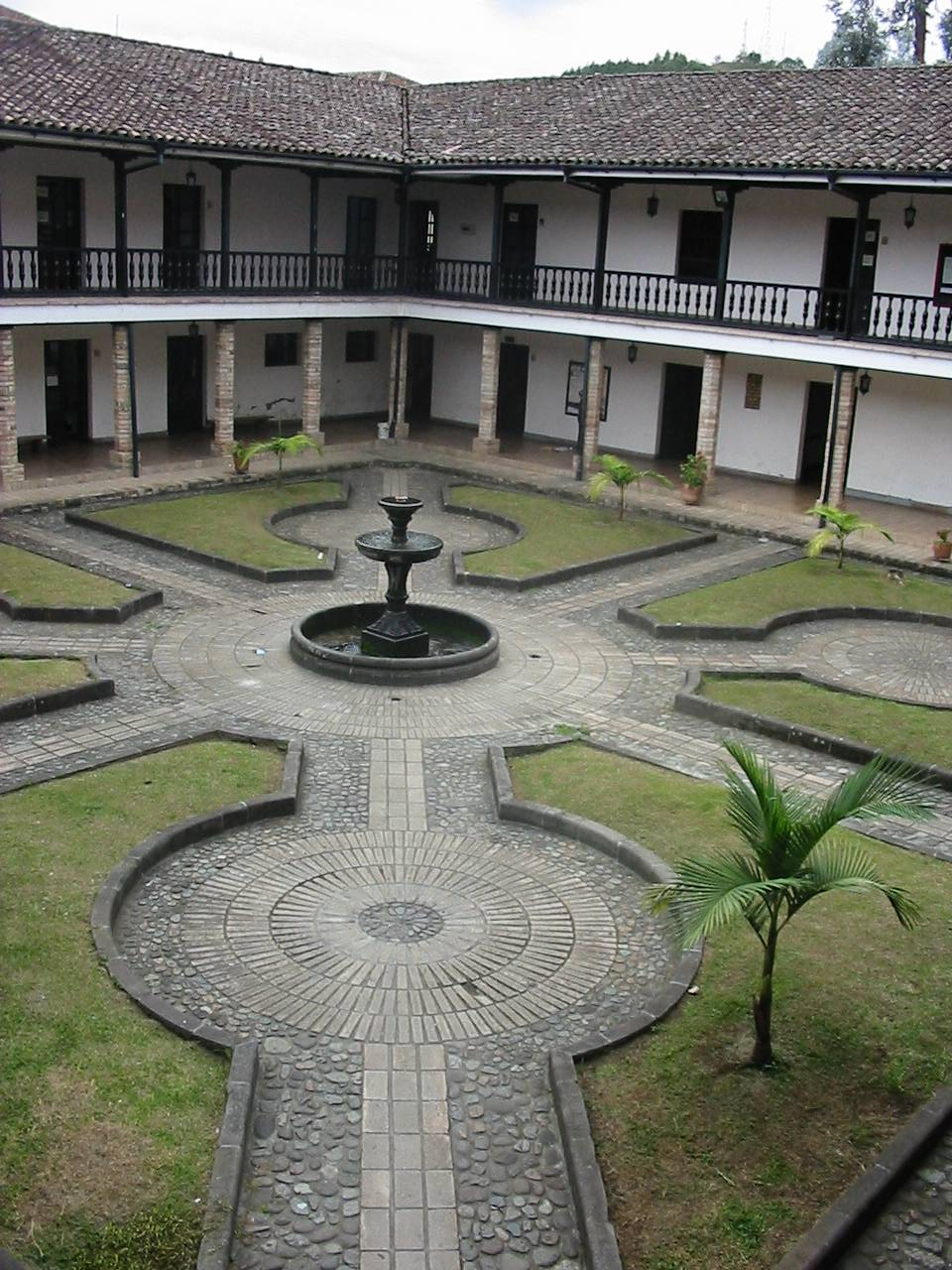
Humanities Faculty of University of Cauca

== See also ==
- Crown
