= Guillermo Valencia =

Colombian poet

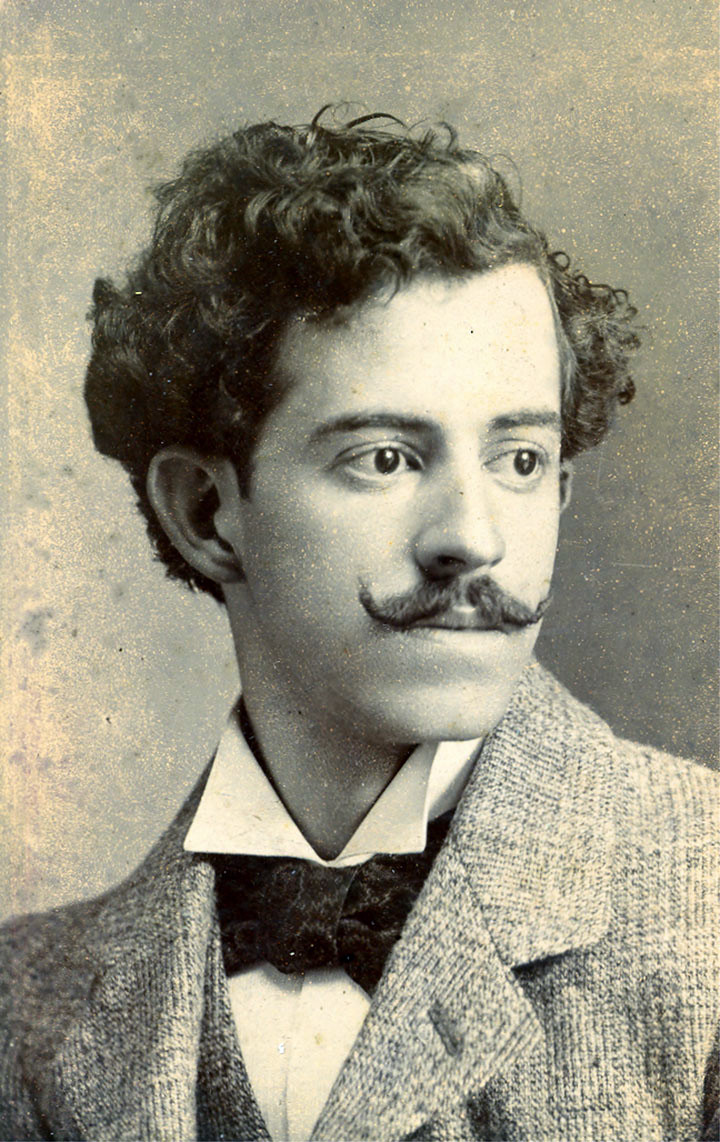
- Born: Guillermo Valencia Castillo; October 29, 1873; Popayán, Cauca, Colombia
- Died: July 8, 1943 (aged 69); Popayán, Colombia
- Occupations: Poet, translator
- Spouse: Josefina Muñoz Muñoz
- Children: Guillermo León Valencia; Josefina Valencia Muñoz
- Parent(s): Joaquín Valencia Quijano; Adelaida Castillo Silva

Signature
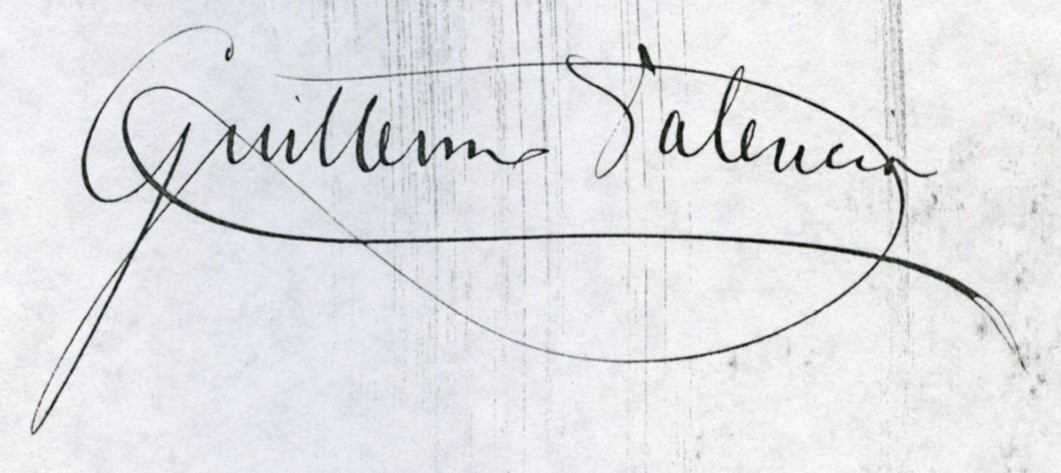

Guillermo Valencia Castillo (October 29, 1873 in Popayán, Colombia – July 8, 1943 in Popayán) was a Colombian poet, translator, and politician. Valencia was a pioneer of Modernism in Colombia and a member of the Colombian Conservative Party. He was the father of five children, including Guillermo León Valencia (1909–1971), Colombian president during 1962–1966, and Josefina Valencia Muñoz, Governor of Cauca.

== Biography ==
Valencia was the son of Joaquín Valencia Quijano and Adelaida Castillo Silva. He became an orphan at eight years old. He studied in Medellín.

=== Literary career ===
His first volume of poetry, Ritos (1899, rev. ed. 1914; "Rites"), containing original poems and free translations from French, Italian, and Portuguese, established his literary reputation at home and abroad as a leader of the experimental Modernist movement with its exotic imagery.

He had the poetry magazine Paginas de Anarkos, considered a major journal associated with many Colombian literary figures of the time. It had illustrations by masters like Santiago Martinez Delgado.

He was never a prolific poet; in later years, he abandoned original poetry almost entirely, concentrating on translations. One of these was Catay (1928; "Cathay"), which he translated from Franz Toussaint's La Flute de Jade ("The Jade Flute"), a French translation of an anthology of Chinese poems. He translated La balada de la cárcel de Reading (1932; "The Ballad of Reading Gaol") from the English poem by the 19th-century writer Oscar Wilde. He also turned more frequently to writing essays, many of which are collected in Panegíricos, discursos y artículos (1933; "Panegyrics, Speeches, and Articles").

=== Political career ===
He led an active career as a statesman and a diplomat and was twice a candidate for the presidency of Colombia, in 1918 and 1930. In 1918, he lost to Marco Fidel Suárez. In 1930, he lost the presidential election to liberal Enrique Olaya Herrera.

== Personal life ==
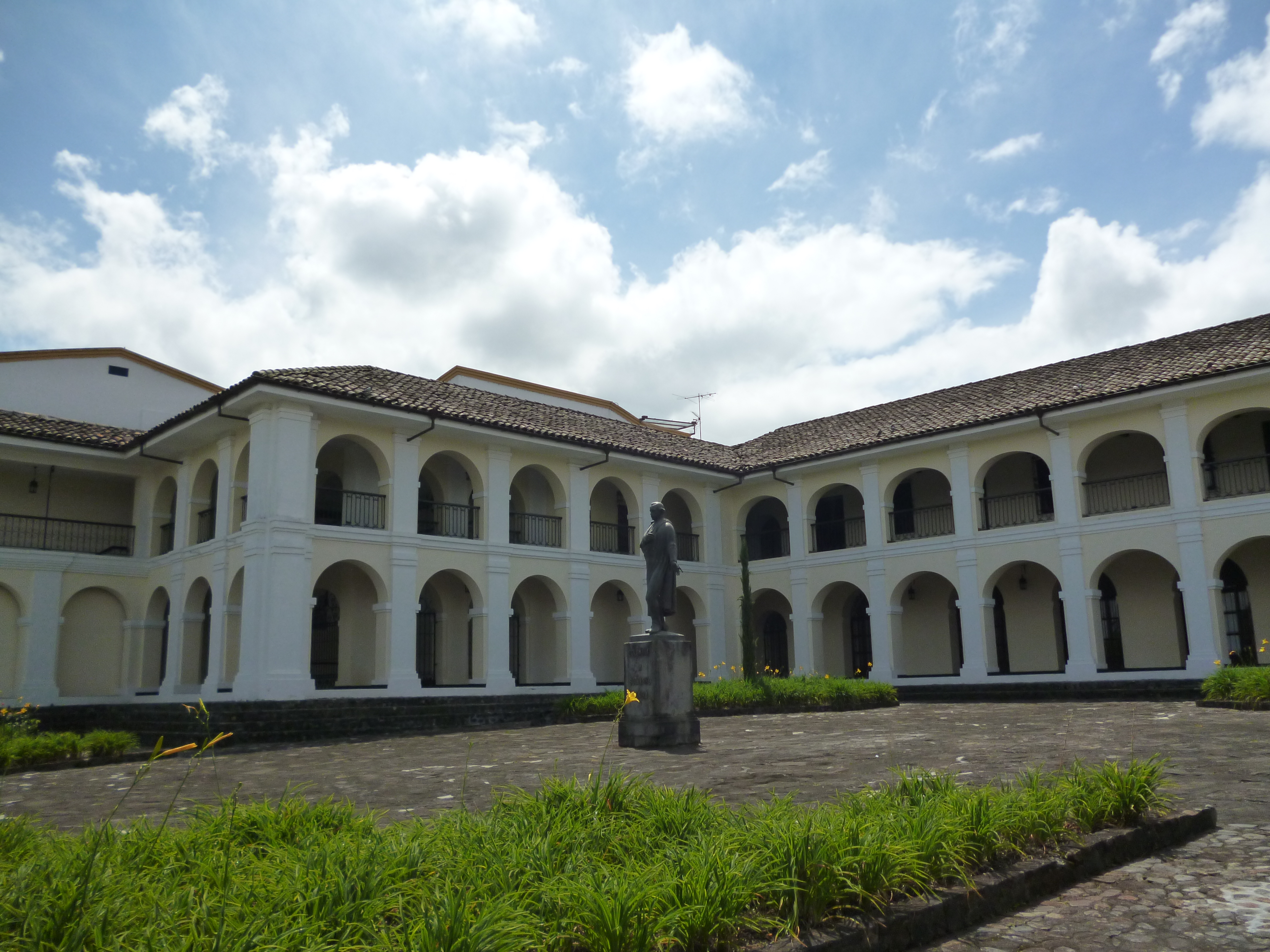
Guillermo Valencia National Museum

Valencia married Josefina Muñoz Muñoz in 1908. Together, they had five children.

He was the grandfather of Pedro Felipe Valencia López, a Colombian politician.

== Honors and awards ==
The house where he lived and died was turned into a museum. A municipal theater in Popayán, Colombia was also named after him were roads at across different cities and several status in Popayan. The national poetry prize in Colombia is named in his honor.

== Bibliography ==
=== Poetry ===
- Poesías (1898)
- Ritos (1899)
- Sus mejores poemas (1926)
- Catay (1929)

== See also ==
- José Asunción Silva
