= Family of Francia Márquez =

Colombian second family from 2022 to 2026

Márquez family
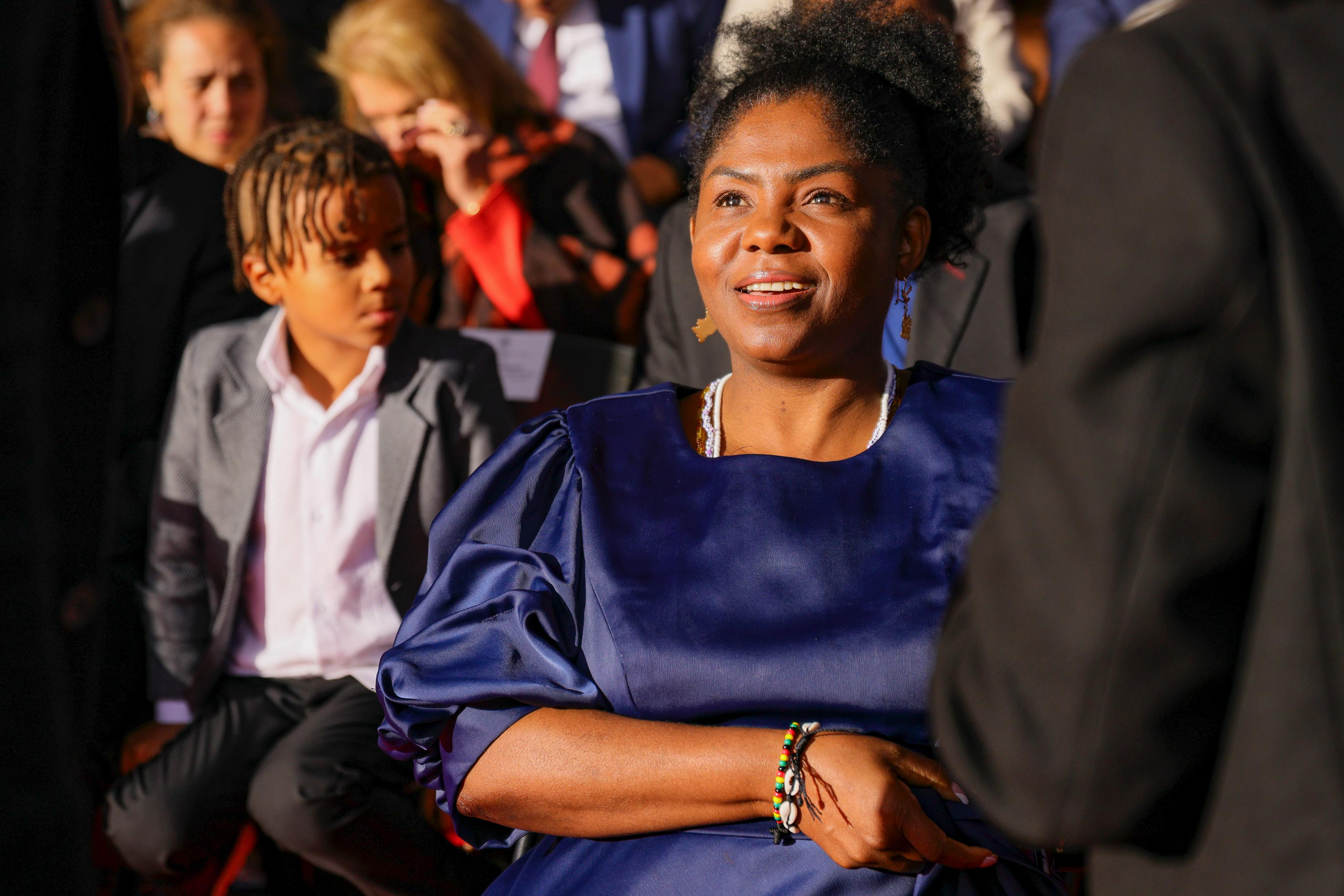
- Márquez family on August 14, 2025
- Current region: Suárez, Cauca, Colombia
- Origin: Suárez, Cauca, Colombia; Buenaventura, Cauca Valley, Colombia
- Members: Francia Márquez; Yerney Pinillo; Carlos Adrián Márquez; Kevin Márquez
- Distinctions: Vice President of Colombia; Second Gentleman of Colombia

Francia Márquez, the 13th and current vice president of Colombia has family members who are prominent in medicine, activism and politics. Immediate family became the second family of Colombia on her inauguration on August 7, 2022. Márquez's family descends primarily from Senegal and Spain.

== Immediate family ==
=== Yerney Pinillo ===
Yerney Pinillo has been Francia Márquez's partner since 2020. He was born in Buenaventura, Cauca Valley. He worked as a messenger before meeting Márquez.

In 2023, he became a member of the active reserve of the National Police of Colombia. Following Márquez's announcement as Petro's running mate in the 2022 Colombian presidential election, he became her closest ally. After the Petro-Márquez ticket won, he moved into the Vice Presidential House with her, making history as the first afrocolombian spouse, the second man, and the first to live in a common-law union with a vice president of Colombia.

=== Carlos Adrián Márquez ===
Carlos Adrián Márquez is the eldest son of Francia Márquez and her first partner. He was born when his mother was 16. He is a medical student in Havana, Cuba.

=== Kevin Márquez ===
He is the Francia Márquez's youngest son. He graduated from high school in 2018 following the victory of the Petro-Márquez ticket in the 2022 Colombian presidential election and moved to the United States to expand his English skills.

== Parents ==
=== Sigifredo Márquez ===
Sigifredo Márquez Trujillo (born September 13, 1959) is a farmer, a member of a family of 11 siblings. He separated from Francia Márquez's mother when she was 12 years old. In June 2024, Márquez was the victim of an attack on his farm located in the town of Robles, a rural area of Jamundí, Cauca Valley, from which he emerged unharmed. Attacks later condemned by President Gustavo Petro and Vice President Francia Márquez.

=== Gloria Mina ===
Gloria María Mina López is Franzia Marquezes mum

== See also ==
- Family of Gustavo Petro
- List of women's firsts
