= Second Lady or Second Gentleman of Colombia =

Spouse or partner of the vice president of Colombia

Second Lady of Colombia
- Current; Tatiana Cespedes since August 7, 2026
- Style: Mrs. Cespedes; Madam Second Lady
- Abbreviation: SLOC (for second lady)
- Residence: Vice Presidential House, Bogotá, D.C.
- Inaugural holder: Felipa Meilhon (as second lady); Álvaro Rincón (as second gentleman)
- Formation: November 17, 1819 (206 years ago)
- Website: Official website

Second Lady of Colombia or Second Gentleman (Second Lady of the Nation) it is the informal and unofficial title held by the spouse of the Vice President of Colombia, simultaneously with the Vice President's term of office. The second lady since August 7, 2026, is Tatiana Cespedes, wife of Vice President José Manuel Restrepo.

Coined in contrast to "first lady"—though less frequently used—the "second lady" term's origin is not clearly documented, but María Victoria García de Santos (wife of Francisco Santos Calderón, vice president from 2002 to 2010) is generally considered the title's originator, given her prominent role during Álvaro Uribe's presidency. The first second gentleman of Colombia was Álvaro Rincón, husband of Marta Lucía Ramírez, vice president from 2018 to 2022.

Three second ladies became first ladies during their husbands' presidential terms. The first was Ana de Narváez de Caro, wife of Miguel Antonio Caro, second vice president (1892-1894) and sixth president (1894-1898). The most recent was Antonia Ferrero de González, wife of Ramón González Valencia, fourth vice president (1904-1905) and eleventh president (1909-1910).

Since the 1990s, the vice presidential official residence is the Vice Presidential House in Bogotá, D.C.

== History ==
The second spouse's visibility in the public sphere is a recent development. While the role of the first lady as hostess of the Casa de Nariño dates back to the early days of the republic (and was usually filled by another member of the president's family if he was single or widowed), it wasn't until the late 21st century that vice presidents' wives assumed visible public roles.

The role of the second lady or gentleman is unpaid and not formally defined. Traditionally, the wife of the Vice President of Colombia was expected to act as hostess and appear at social events. The issue of the status of the second spouse became a topic of debate in 2023 when Yerney Pinillo, partner of Vice President Francia Márquez (2022-2026), assumed the role of escort during her official and state visits, since they were not married.

Luz María Zapata, wife of Vice President Germán Vargas Lleras, was the first second lady to significantly enhance the role of vice president's spouse. When Santos assumed office in 2010, the second lady's only official function was to accompany the vice president on official visits. However, Zapata promoted her own initiatives, without overshadowing those of first lady María Clemencia de Santos, and provided support during natural disasters, in addition to distinguishing herself through her personal achievements.

== List ==
In the Great Colombia; Spouse of the vice president (1819–1831)
| Vice President | Spouse | Ternure |
|---|---|---|
| Francisco Antonio Zea | Felipa Meilhon Montemayor de Zea | December 17, 1819 - March 21, 1820 |
| Juan Germán Roscio | María Dolores Cuevas | March 21, 1820 – March 10, 1821 |
| Antonio Nariño | Magdalena Ortega de Nariño | April 4, 1821 – June 6, 1821 |
| José María del Castillo | Teresa de Rivas del Castillo | June 6, 1821 – October 3, 1821 |
| Francisco de Paula Santander | Sixta Pontón de Santander | November 3, 1821 – September 19, 1827 |
| Domingo Caycedo | Juana Jurado de Caycedo | May 3, 1830 – November 21, 1831 |
In the Republic of New Granada; Spouse of the vice president (1831–1858)
| Vice President | Spouse | Ternure |
| José María Obando | Dolores Espinosa de los Monteros Mesa | November 23, 1831 – March 10, 1832 |
| José Ignacio de Márquez | María Antonia del Castillo | March 10, 1832 – October 7, 1832 |
| Joaquín Mosquera | María Josefa Mosquera Hurtado | May 12, 1833 - April 1, 1835 |
| José Ignacio de Márquez | María Antonia del Castillo | April 1, 1835 – April 1, 1837 |
| Domingo Caycedo | Juana Jurado de Caycedo | April 1, 1837 – April 1, 1843 |
| Joaquín Gori was a widower. | | April 1, 1843 – April 1, 1845 |
| Rufino Cuervo | María Francisca de Urisarri | April 1, 1845 - April 1, 1851 |
| José de Obaldía | Ana María Gallegos Candanedo | April 1, 1851 - April 1, 1855 |
| Manuel María Mallarino | María Mercedes Cabal | August 5, 1854 - April 1, 1855 |
Colombia; Second lady or second gentleman (1886–1905; 1994-present)
| Eliseo Payán | Carmen Ospina Lenis de Payán | December 13, 1887 – February 8, 1888 |
| Miguel Antonio Caro | Ana de Narváez de Caro | August 7, 1892 – September 18, 1894 |
| José Manuel Marroquín | Matilde Osorio de Marroquín | August 7, 1898 – July 31, 1900 |
| Ramón González Valencia | Antonia Ferrero de González | August 7, 1904 – March 10, 1905 |
| Humberto De la Calle | Rosalba Restrepo de la Calle | 7 August 1994 – 10 September 1996 |
| Carlos Lemos Simmonds | Marta Blanco de Lemos | September 19, 1996 – August 7, 1998 |
| Gustavo Bell | María Mercedes de la Espriella | August 7, 1998 – August 7, 2002 |
| Francisco Santos Calderón | María Victoria García de Santos | August 7, 2002 – August 7, 2010 |
| Angelino Garzón | Monserrat Muñoz de Garzón | August 7, 2010 – August 7, 2014 |
| Germán Vargas Lleras | Luz María Zapata | August 7, 2014 – March 21, 2017 |
| Óscar Naranjo | Claudia Luque | March 29, 2017 – August 7, 2018 |
| Marta Lucía Ramírez | Álvaro Rincón | August 7, 2018 – August 7, 2022 |
| Francia Márquez | Yerney Pinillo | August 7, 2022 – August 7, 2026 |
| José Manuel Restrepo | Tatiana Cespedes | August 7, 2026 – present |

== See also ==
- First Lady of Colombia (list)
- Vice President of Colombia (list)
- Colombian order of precedence
