= Yerney Pinillo =

Second Gentleman of Colombia from 2022 to 2026

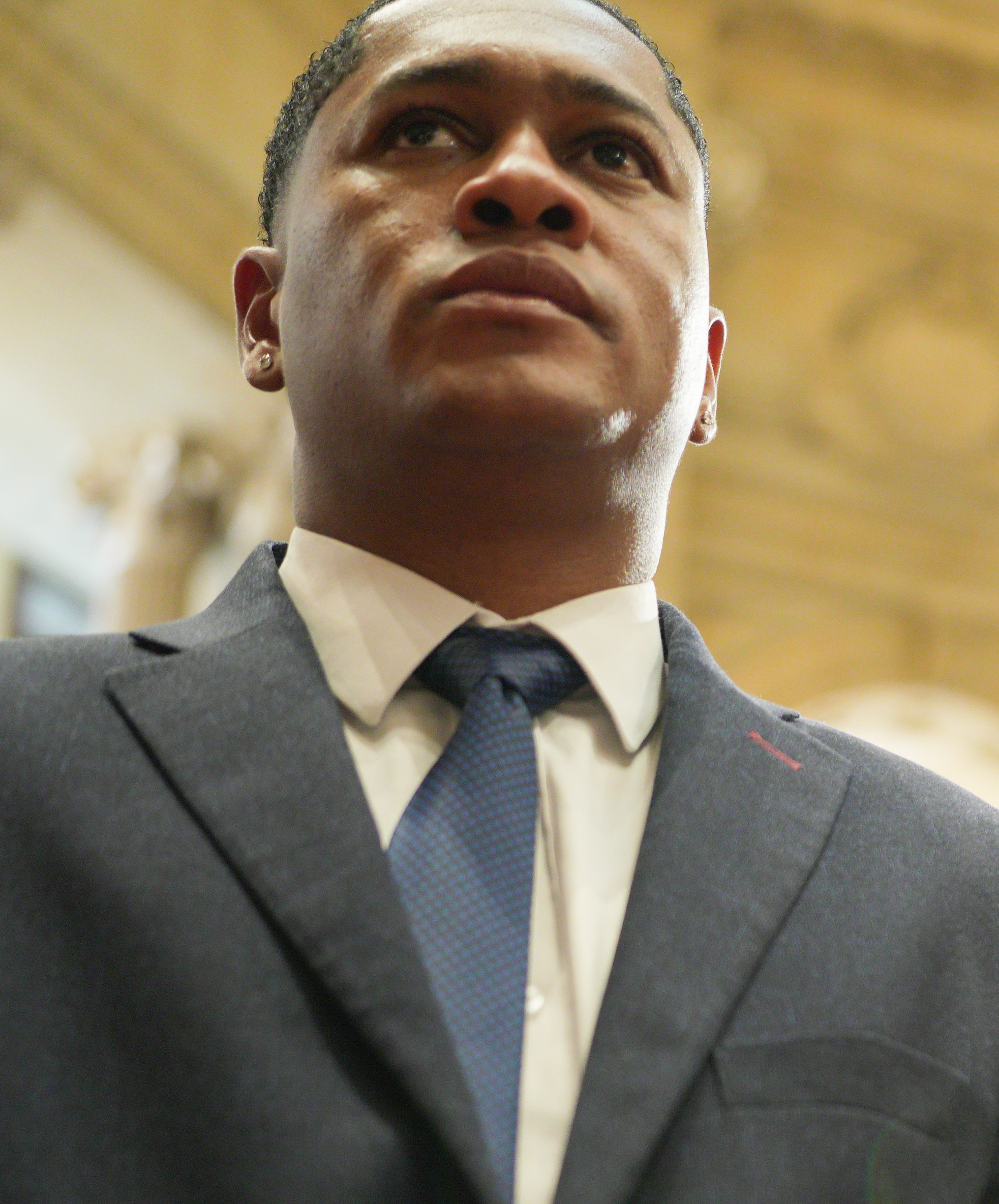
- Pinillo in 2024

Second Gentleman of Colombia
- In role 7 August 2022 – 7 August 2026
- Vice President: Francia Márquez
- Preceded by: Álvaro Rincón
- Succeeded by: Tatiana Cespedes (as second lady)

Personal details
- Born: Rafael Yerney Pinillo Ocoró; 1986 (age 39–40) Buenaventura, Cauca Valley, Colombia
- Party: Historic Pact (2026-present)
- Other political affiliations: Soy Porque Somos (2021-2022)
- Domestic partner: Francia Márquez (2020-present)
- Relatives: Márquez family

Military service
- Allegiance: Colombia
- Branch/service: National Police of Colombia
- Years of service: 2023–2024
- Rank: Lieutenant

Rafael Yerney Pinillo Ocoró (born c. 1986) is a Colombian lieutenant of the National Police of Colombia who served as the second gentleman of Colombia from 2022 to 2026 as the partner of Vice President Francia Márquez, the 13th vice president of Colombia.

Born in Buenaventura, Cauca Valley. Pinillo is the first Afro-Colombian second gentleman in the entire history of Colombia. In 2023 he graduated as a Professional Police Reserve Officer of the Colombian National Police.

== Second Gentleman of Colombia (2022-2026) ==
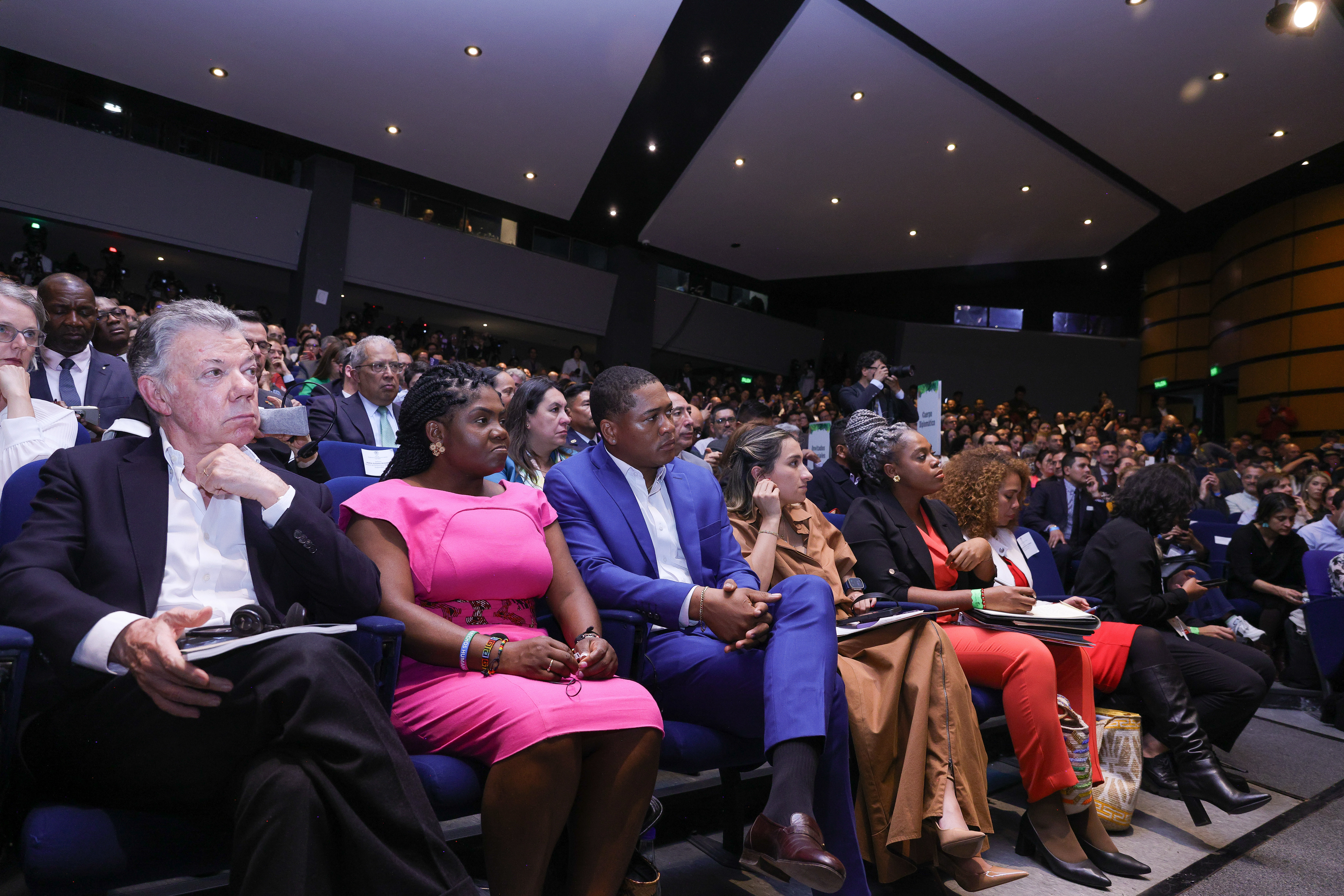
Yerney Pinillo with Vice President Francia Márquez, General Director of DAPRE, Laura Sarabia, Minister of National Education, Aurora Vergara, Minister of Science, Yesenia Olaya and former President Juan Manuel Santos during the Book Fair.

On 7 August 2022, during the 32nd Colombian presidential inauguration, Yerney became the de facto Second Gentleman of Colombia. Being the second man in the role and the first Afro-Colombian. As second gentleman, his role has been much more active than that of his predecessors. In May 2023, he accompanied his partner on his visits to Ghana, South Africa and Kenya.

On 15 August 2023, he and his partner received the Duke and Duchess of Sussex at the Vice Presidential House. And on 18 August 2023, the Vice President, the Mayor of Cali, Alejandro Eder, and the First Lady of Cali, Taliana Vargas, joined in the farewell and gratitude. On 20 July 2025, he accompanied the Vice President for the third consecutive year during the July 20th Parade, being described as the Vice President's unconditional supporter. In September 2025, he accompanied the Vice President to Abuja, Nigeria, where they sought to strengthen diplomacy and economic relations between Nigeria and Colombia.

Honorary titles
Preceded by Álvaro Rincón	Second Gentleman of Colombia; 2022–2026	Succeeded by Tatiana Cespedes as Second Lady
