= Francia Márquez =

Vice President of Colombia from 2022 to 2026

Her Excellency Francia Márquez
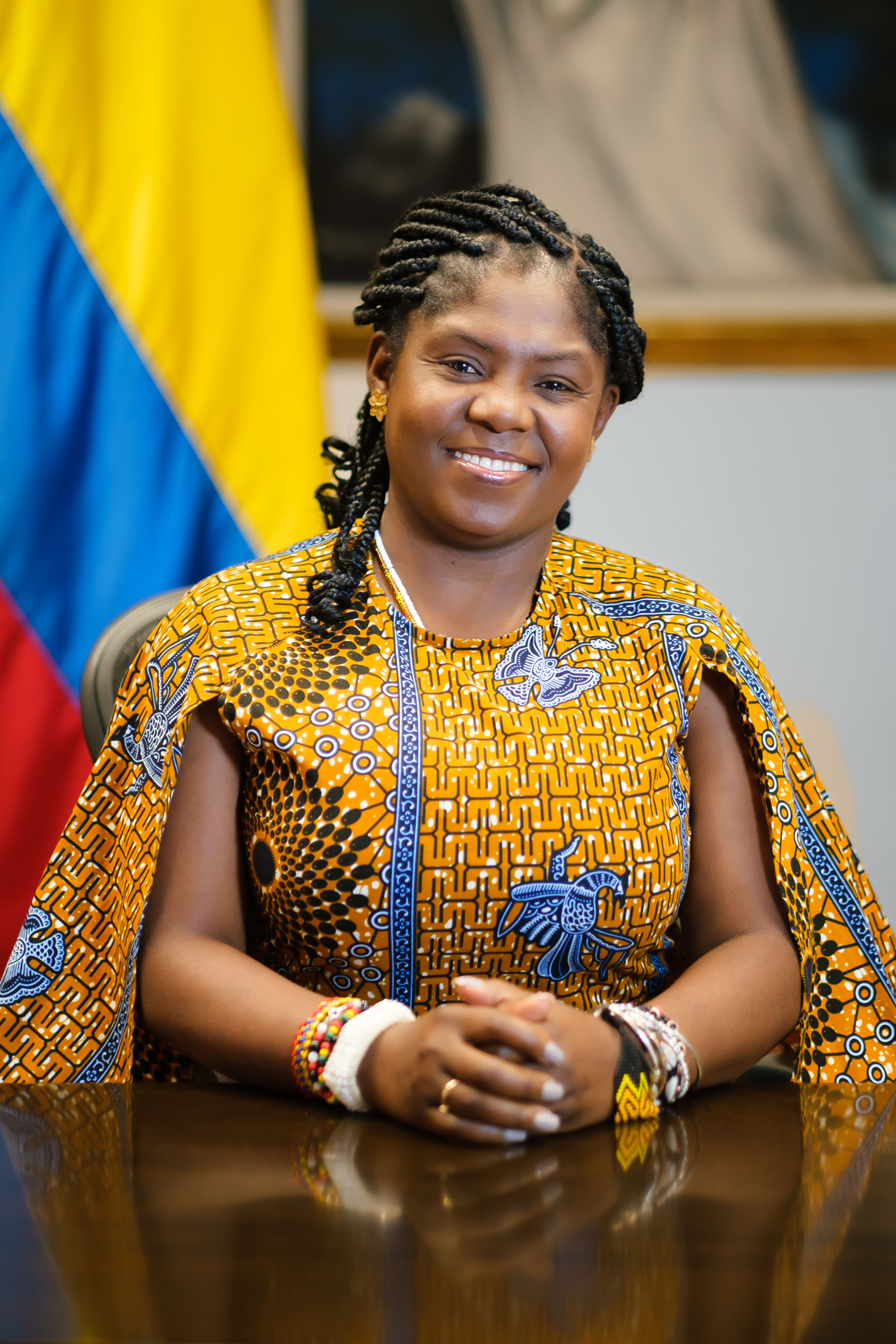
- Official portrait, 2023

13th Vice President of Colombia
- In office 7 August 2022 – 7 August 2026
- President: Gustavo Petro
- Preceded by: Marta Lucía Ramírez
- Succeeded by: José Manuel Restrepo

Minister of Equality and Equity
- In office 1 June 2023 – 27 February 2025
- President: Gustavo Petro
- Preceded by: Office established
- Succeeded by: Carlos Rosero

Personal details
- Born: Francia Elena Márquez Mina; 1 December 1981 (age 44) Yolombó, Cauca, Colombia (Note: Not to be confused with the municipality of Yolombó in the Antioquia department.)
- Party: Historic Pact (2026–present)
- Other political affiliations: Soy Porque Somos (2021–2022); Alternative Democratic Pole (2021–2023); Historic Pact for Colombia (2021–2025)
- Domestic partner: Yerney Pinillo (since 2020)
- Children: 2
- Education: National Learning Service
- Alma mater: Santiago de Cali University (LLB, 2020); National Pedagogic University (EdD, 2023)
- Profession: Lawyer

Francia Elena Márquez Mina (Note: In this Spanish name, the first or paternal surname is Márquez and the second or maternal family name is Mina.) (born 1 December 1981) is a Colombian politician who served as the 13th Vice President of Colombia from 2022 to 2026. She was born in Yolombó, Cauca, a village in the southwest of Colombia. She first became an activist at 13, when construction of a dam threatened her community. On taking office, she became the first Afro-Colombian vice president in the country's history. She is also the second woman to hold the post, after Marta Lucía Ramírez.

In 2018, she was awarded the Goldman Environmental Prize for her work to stop illegal gold mining in her community of La Toma and for her community organising. Márquez led a protest march of 80 women who trekked 560 kilometres (350 miles) to the capital city of Bogotá, and demanded the removal of all illegal miners from their community. In 2019, the BBC listed Francia Márquez on their 100 Women list for that year.

In August 2020, Márquez announced her candidacy in the 2022 Colombian presidential election and sought the nomination for the Historic Pact for Colombia coalition. She was later chosen by the coalition's nominee, Gustavo Petro, to be his running mate. In 2023 she was also appointed as Minister for Equality and Equity.

== Early life ==
Francia Elena Márquez Mina was born on 1 December 1981, in the town of Yolombó, a part of the municipality of Suárez, Cauca.

=== Activism ===
==== Ovejas river defence ====
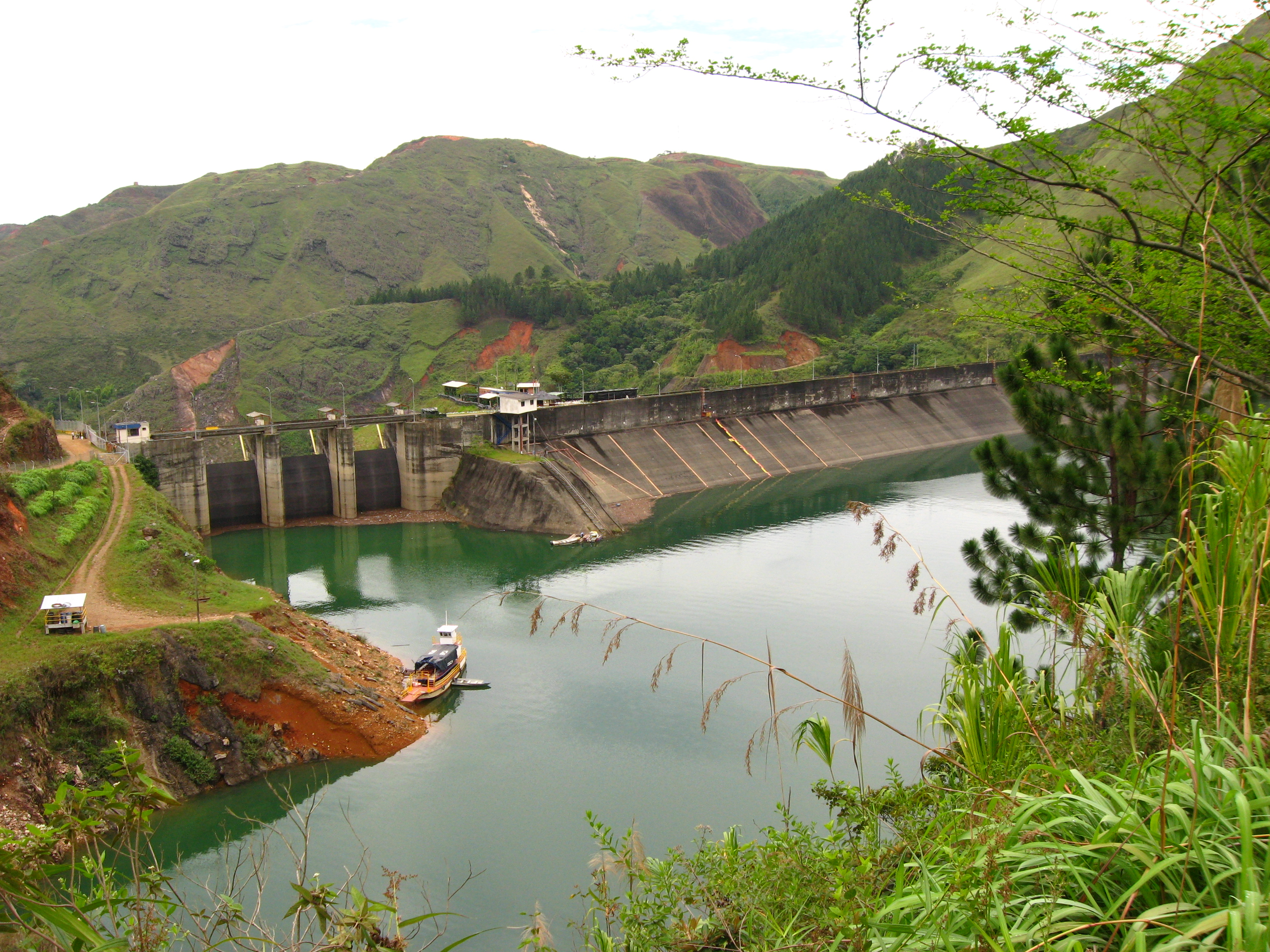
Salvajina hydroelectric dam, Cauca department in 2010

From 1994 when she turned 13, Márquez began participating in the fight against mining exploitation and the protection of the Ovejas River, which was a large and important source of water for her community.

Companies such as Unión Fenosa planned to divert the river towards the Salvajina hydroelectric dam. Her community managed to prevent the project.

Other companies, such as AngloGold Ashanti, which sought to extract gold in the region, threatening the cleanup of the river, began to invest in the community by building roads and donating school supplies. Márquez recalls that while some appreciated the company's generosity, others were distrustful, stating that.

"others among us thought that 'nothing comes for free, they must have an ulterior motive.' And there was already talk of a mining project, so we listened to our elders and said 'no' to AngloGold. The company responded by delivering leaflets to residents' homes, threatening eviction.

==== Opposition to illegal mining ====
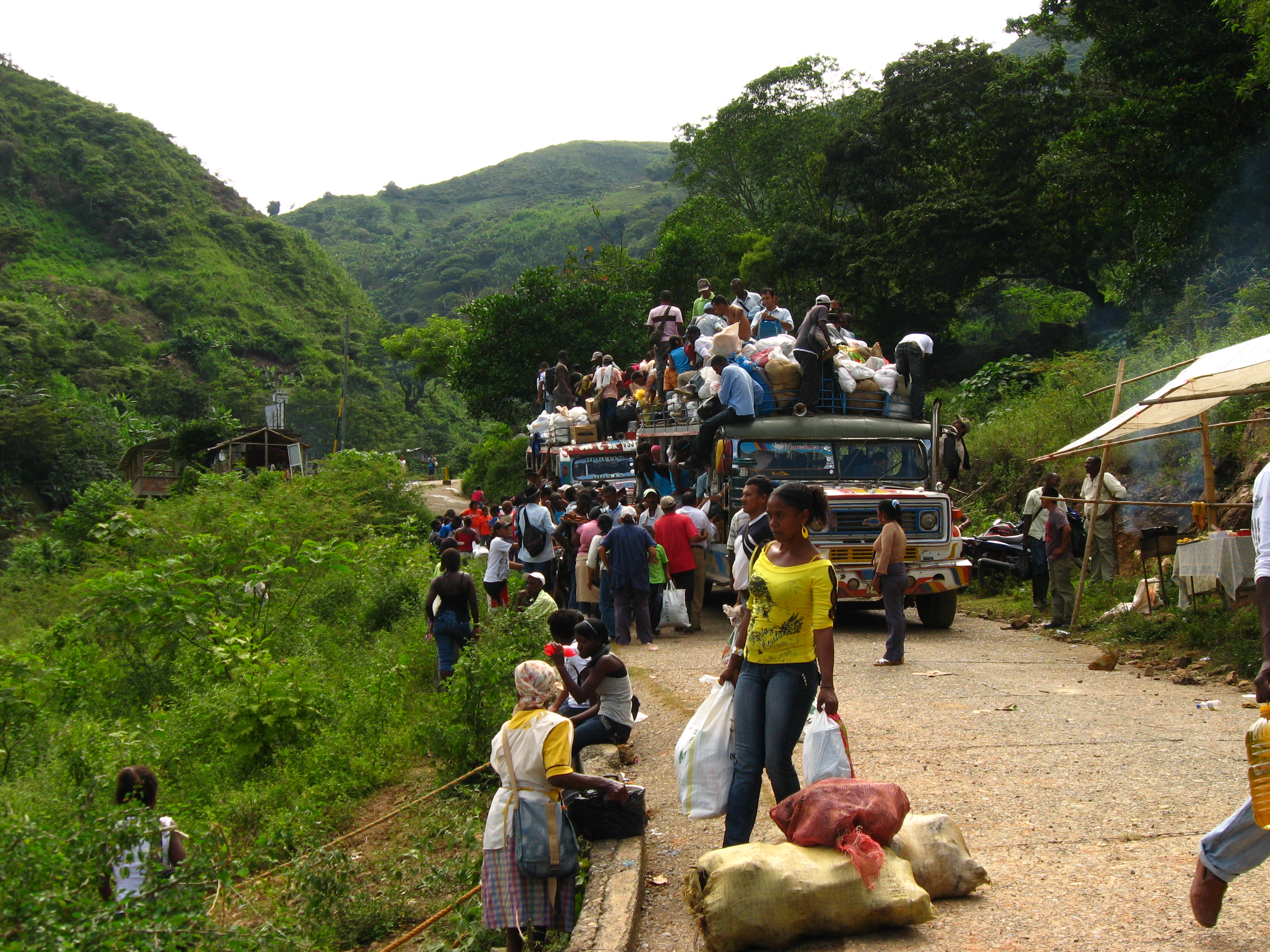
Residents of Yolombó, Cauca

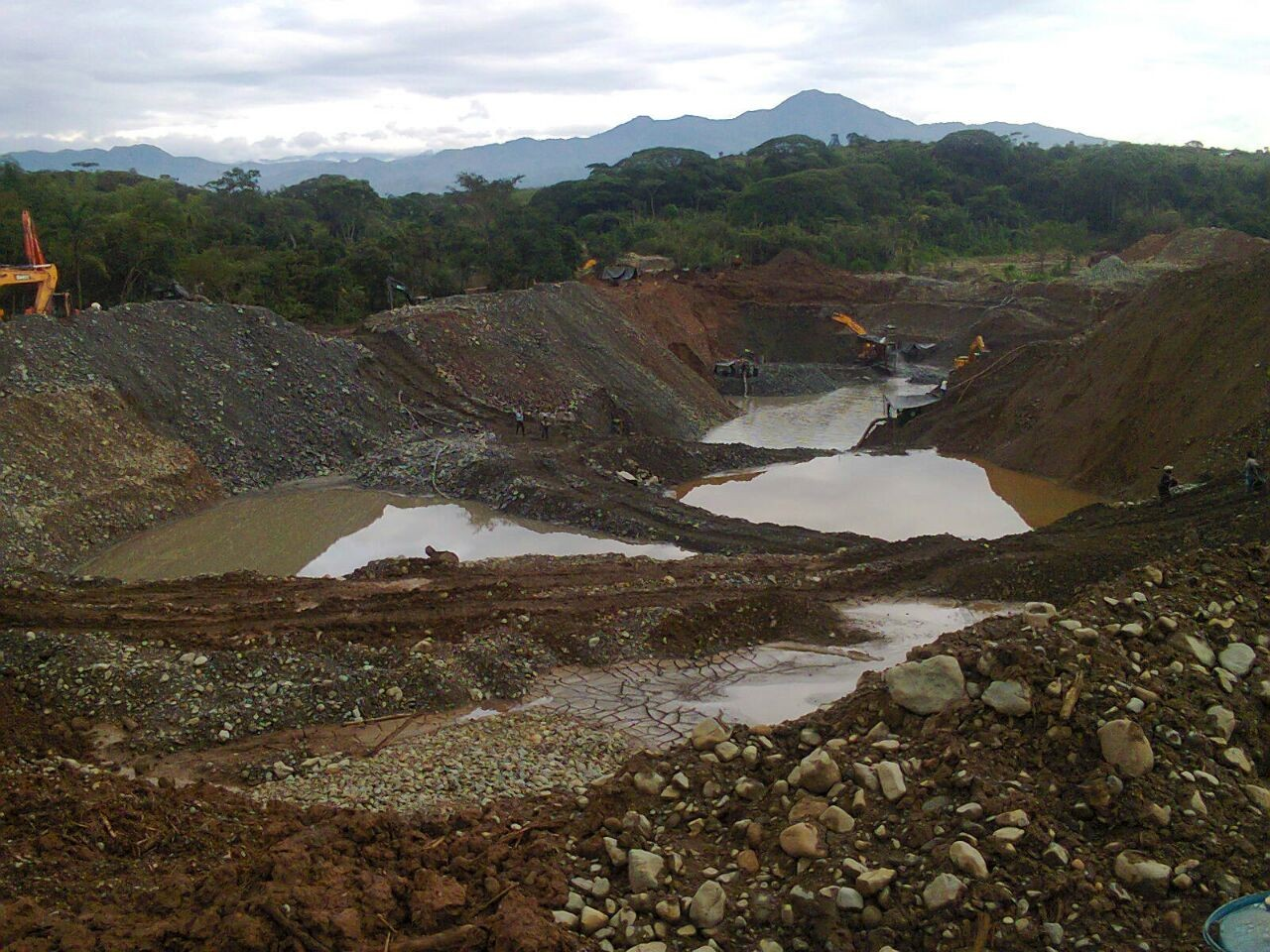
Illegal mining in the Cauca department

During the presidencies of Álvaro Uribe and Juan Manuel Santos, there was an increase in the invitation of international mining companies to extract natural resources in Colombia.

In 2009, Márquez helped lead protests against attempts by the government to evict Afro-Colombians, especially artisanal miners, from ancestral land near the town of La Toma. The ministry of the Interior had granted companies such as AngloGold the right to mine for gold in the area without consulting residents. Márquez, along with members of the community council of La Toma, filed a lawsuit challenging the decision. During this time, several members of the committee received death threats. Paramilitary groups subsequently targeted the community, killing several artisanal miners on the river banks. Márquez prevailed when the constitutional court ruled in her community's favour.

In 2013, Márquez became a legal representative in La Toma. She also took part in the permanent assembly in Cauca, which advocated for the National Land Agency to protect territory. The following year, Márquez's community faced environmental damage from illegal miners drilling boreholes near the Ovejas river, poisoned due to mercury use. Márquez again sought legal action and worked with other community members to combat environmental damage caused by illegal miners. However, in October 2014, Márquez was forced to flee to Cali with her children after receiving threats from paramilitary groups.

== Political career ==
=== March to Bogotá ===
Facing increased threats from illegal mining, Márquez organised a 350-kilometre long march from Cauca to Bogotá in 2014. The March, which consisted of 80 Afro-Colombian women, saw an increase in attention to illegal mining in Cauca, as well as the social and environmental destruction and suffering the illegal mining had caused in the community. The party arrived in Bogotá ten days later and began to protest, demanding an end to the illegal mining.

After protesting for 22 days, Márquez, along with other representatives of La Toma, reached an agreement with the Colombian government. Government officials decided to take action against illegal mining and established a task force in 2015 to deal with the issue, a first in Colombian history. The Colombian security forces then began to remove and disassemble illegal mining machinery, and by the conclusion of 2016, all illegal mining apparatuses were no longer present in La Toma. Márquez's efforts and later successes earned her praise internationally and helped inspire other communities in the region to combat illegal mining. As a result of her efforts, Márquez was awarded the Goldman Environmental Prize in 2018.

=== Colombian peace process ===
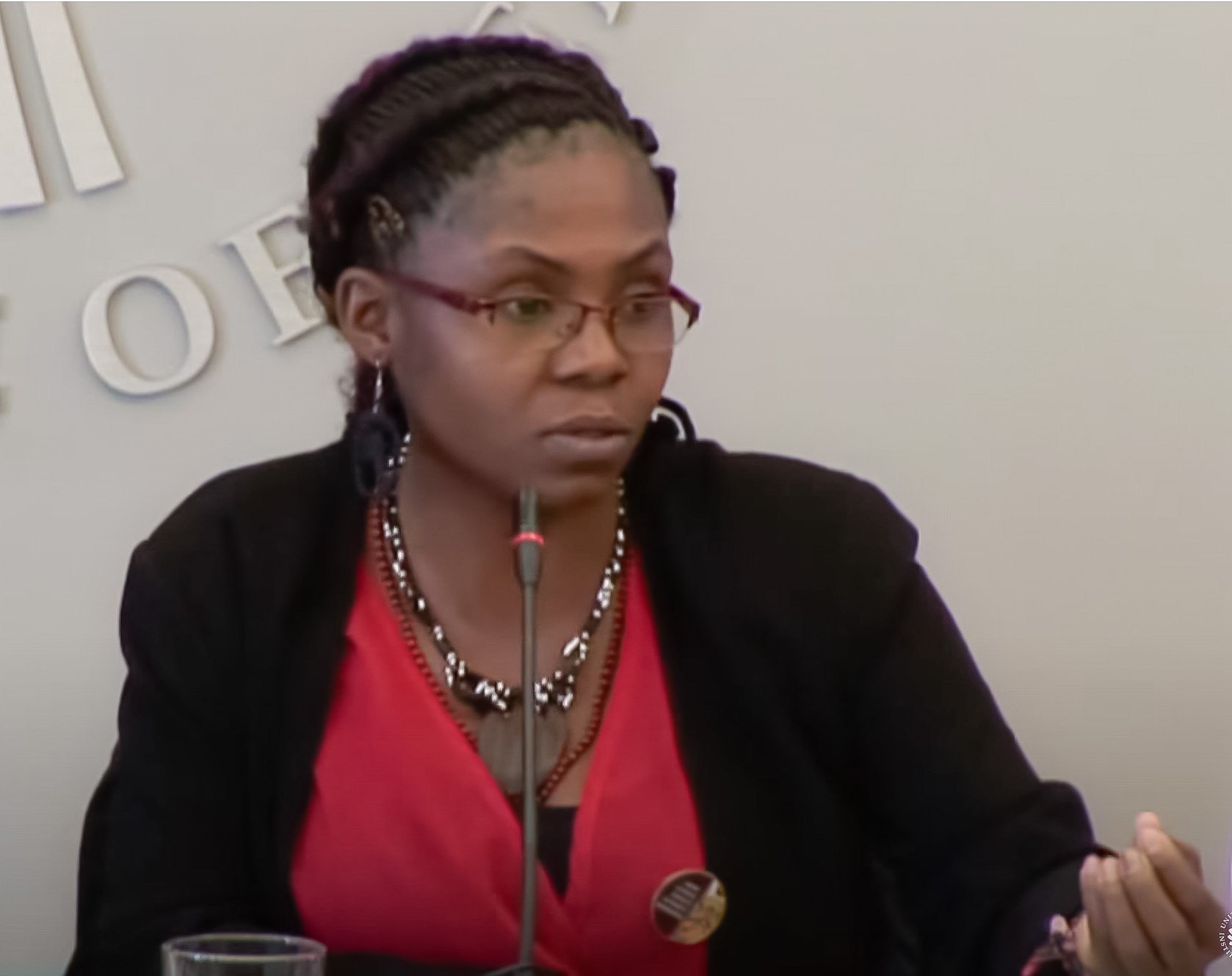
Márquez at the peace negotiations in 2016

In December 2014, Márquez travelled to Havana, Cuba, to participate in the peace negotiations between the administration of president Juan Manuel Santos and the Revolutionary Armed Forces of Colombia. While there, Márquez highlighted how the conflict had disproportionately affected Afro-Colombians and particularly black women. She also emphasised that ethnic minority groups needed to take part in the peace dialogue to ensure the preservation of lasting peace and stability.

In June 2020, Márquez was elected to the National Peace and Co-existence council, established in May 2017, to monitor compliance with the peace agreement. She served as the council's president in 2021.

=== 2022 Presidential campaign ===
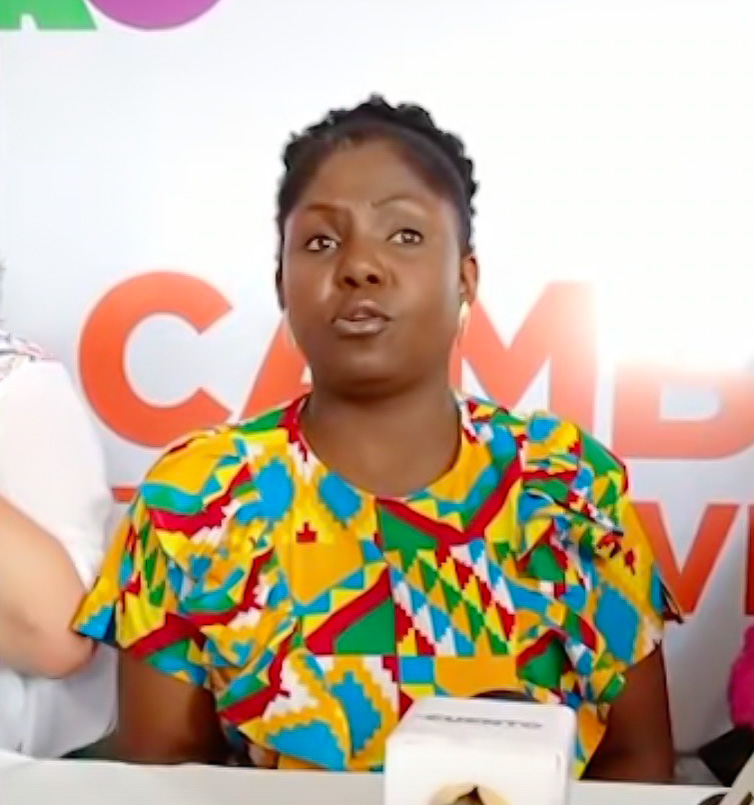
Francia Márquez during her presidential campaign in 2022.

Francia Márquez announced her candidacy for the 2022 presidential election in April 2021, during the National Feminist Convention. The Estamos Listas movement and fellow primary candidate Angelá María Robledo offered their support for Marquez's campaign.

In her campaign, she has advocated for women, Afro-Colombians and indigenous communities; who have been largely excluded from Colombian politics.

In December 2021, after her campaign could not collect the necessary signatures to be an independent candidate, the Alternative Democratic Pole party endorsed Márquez's campaign.

In the March 2022 primary elections for the Historic Pact nomination, Márquez reached a historical result of 783,160 votes. This result placed her in second place after Gustavo Petro – with the second-highest vote total out of all the primary candidates.

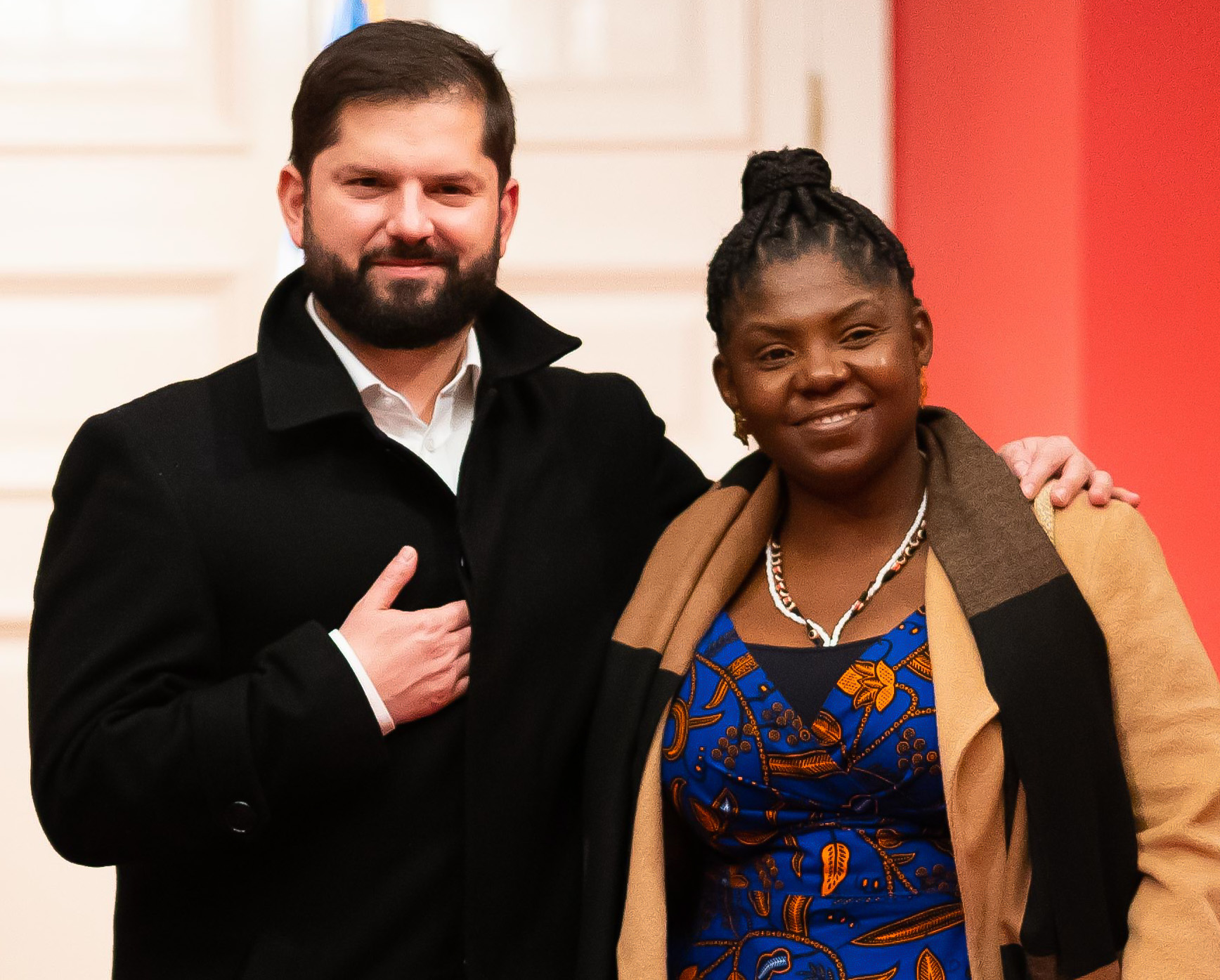
Márquez met with President of Chile Gabriel Boric in 2022

On 23 March 2022, she accepted the nomination for vice president on the ticket for the Historic Pact, joining Gustavo Petro. Márquez subsequently promised that if elected, she would move the vice president's office from Bogotá to Medellín. Petro announced that if victorious, Márquez's role as vice president would include bolstering equality for ethnic groups and regions facing exclusion. Petro pledged to establish the ministry of equality, which Márquez would lead.

In early May 2022, Márquez accused the United States and the U.S. ambassador to Colombia, Philip Goldberg, of attempting to interfere with the elections. Goldberg responded by expressing concern about "the possible intervention of other countries". Márquez's claim arose after Goldberg alleged that Venezuela and Russia would try to interfere in the elections. She further expressed, "Although he (Goldberg) did not mention the Historical Pact or Gustavo Petro, it is obvious that he was referring to our candidacy and our political bet." Despite this, Márquez assured that if victorious, a potential Petro administration would not cut ties with the United States.

During the campaign, Márquez and Gustavo Petro faced numerous death threats. In one instance, while campaigning, Márquez was targeted by laser beams from a nearby building, prompting security guards to shield her from what appeared to be an assassination attempt. In response to this and many other similar situations, 90 elected officials and prominent individuals from over 20 countries signed an open letter expressing concern and condemnation of attempts of political violence against Márquez and Petro. The letter also highlighted the assassination of over 50 social leaders, trade unionists, environmentalists and other community representatives in 2022. Signatories of the letter included former Ecuadorian president Rafael Correa and American linguist and philosopher Noam Chomsky.

On election day, which occurred on 29 May, Márquez's Historic Pact ticket placed first, advancing to the runoff, since no candidate received over 50% of the vote. Márquez and Petro faced Rodolfo Hernández and Marelen Castillo. Shortly after the first round, Márquez and Petro received the endorsement of Luis Gilberto Murillo for the second round. Murillo had been the Vice-Presidential running mate of Sergio Fajardo in the Hope Center Coalition, which did not qualify for the runoff. Márquez and Petro went on to defeat Hernández and Castillo in the second round held on 19 June. Upon her electoral triumph, Márquez proclaimed that the Petro administration would not "expropriate anyone". She said the most significant challenge she faced whilst on the campaign trail was racist attacks. Márquez's inauguration as vice president occurred on 7 August 2022. On the other hand, due to the approval needed by Congress to establish the ministry of equality, Márquez may not assume the leadership of the proposed department until mid-way through her term as vice president.

== Minister of Equality and Equity (2023-2025) ==
In July 2023 Márquez took over as Minister of Equality and Equity. Ministry that had been announced during the 2022 Presidential campaign. On 8 May 2024, the Constitutional Court abolished the Law by which the portfolio was created, establishing that this would disappear in 2026.

On 28 February 2025, she resigned from her position as Minister of Equity and Equality. Márquez alluded to a lack of coherence as well as some corruption scandals on the part of the Petro administration.

== Vice Presidency (2022–2026) ==
Márquez was sworn in as vice president on 7 August 2022. She is also designated to take office as Minister for Women and Equality in the Cabinet of Gustavo Petro.

During a January 2023 speech to the UN Security Council, Márquez pledged to hold a session of the United Nations Security Council in Colombia, saying:

"Our central commitment is to guarantee the life of the entire Colombian population, take care of those who have assumed the defense of human rights as their main cause, protect the communities that are in the middle of the crossfire".

She escaped another assassination attempt in January 2023. An explosive was discovered by her security detail on the road leading to her home.

Márquez was the target of great criticism, from her position as an activist and defender of Afro rights, as well as for the living conditions that her status as vice president entails, she has also been the target of racist attacks.

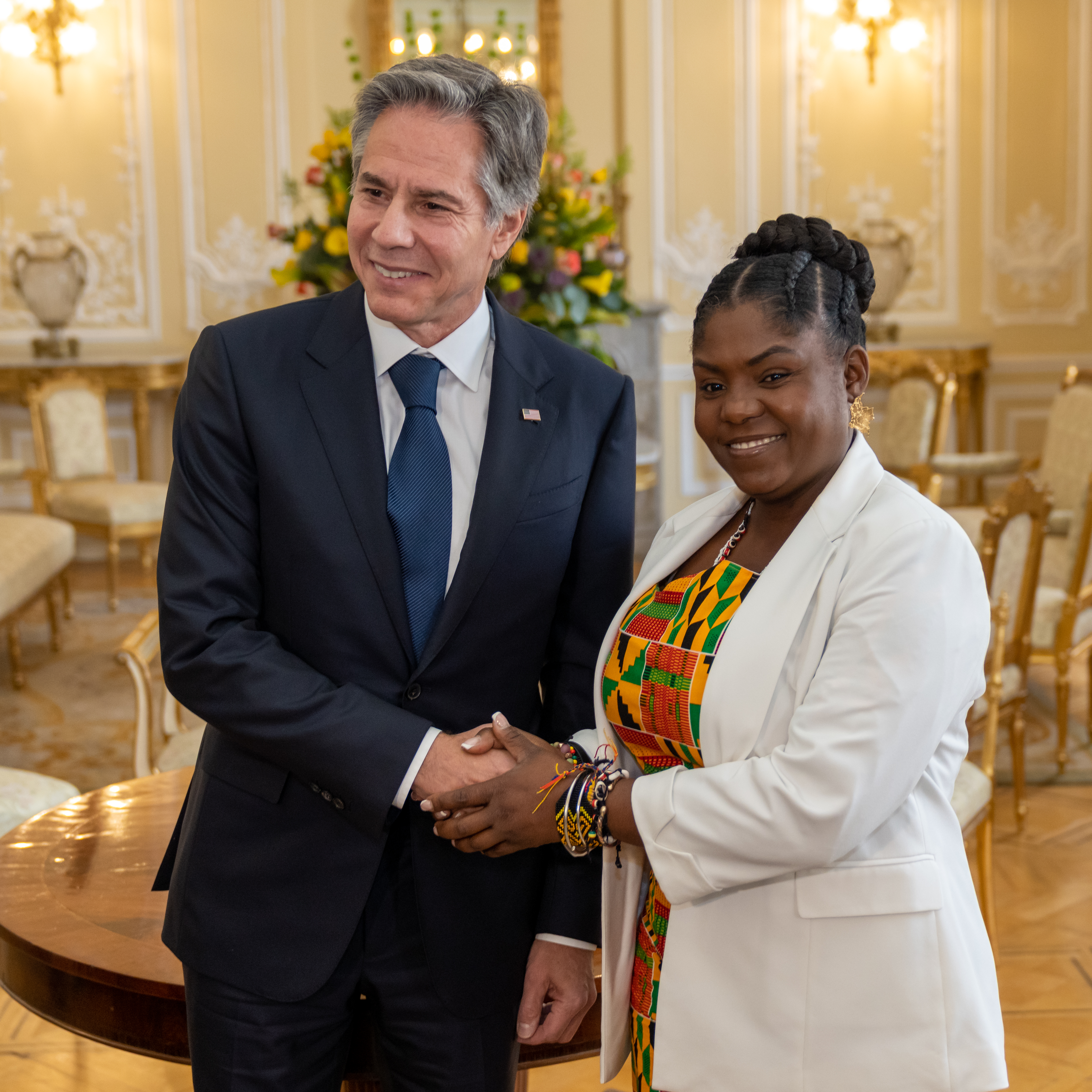
Márquez with US Secretary of State Antony Blinken in 2022

In February 2023, she was criticized for her place of residence, as she preferred to live in a private residence, instead of choosing, as usual in the vice presidents of Colombia since 1999, the vice presidential house, official residence for the vice president of Colombia, In contrast, she received harsh criticism from her detractors for using a helicopter as official means of transportation. A few days later, Márquez responded days later that the president had suggested that she use a helicopter as a means of transportation, because she was very concerned about her safety and that of her family, after she reported that she had been the target of several attacks, from which she had hopefully escaped unharmed.

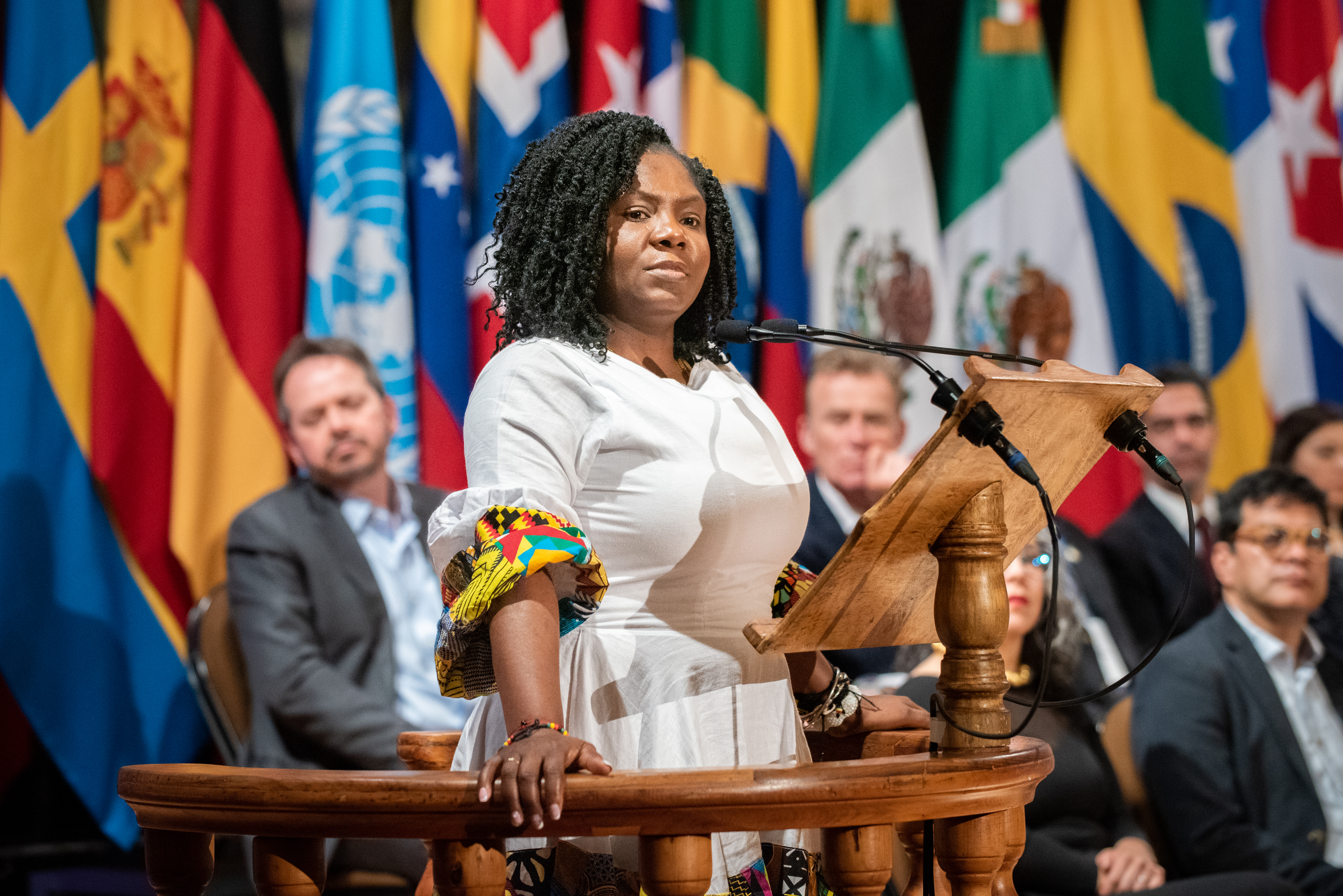
Márquez, during her speech for the closing of the second cycle of dialogues with the ELN in Mexico City.

In May 2023, Márquez announced the start of her tour of Africa as the vice president, in search of connections between Colombia and the African continent.

Among the countries she visited during her tour are South Africa, Kenya and Ethiopia.

On 13 May 2023 Márquez met Cyril Ramaphosa and Paul Mashatile, President and Deputy President of South Africa, whom she invited to be guarantors of the peace processes with the ELN insurgent group, which hours later would be ratified by the government of South Africa, through President Ramphosa, also emphasized the importance of bilateral visa agreements between Colombia and South Africa.

Later on 17 May 2023, she met with the Deputy Prime Minister of Ethiopia, Demeke Mekonnen, who celebrated Colombia's decision to reopen its embassy in Ethiopia after fifty years. and then on 18 May, she held a meeting with President Sahle-Work Zewde who greeted her with the emotional phrase "Welcome to your roots."

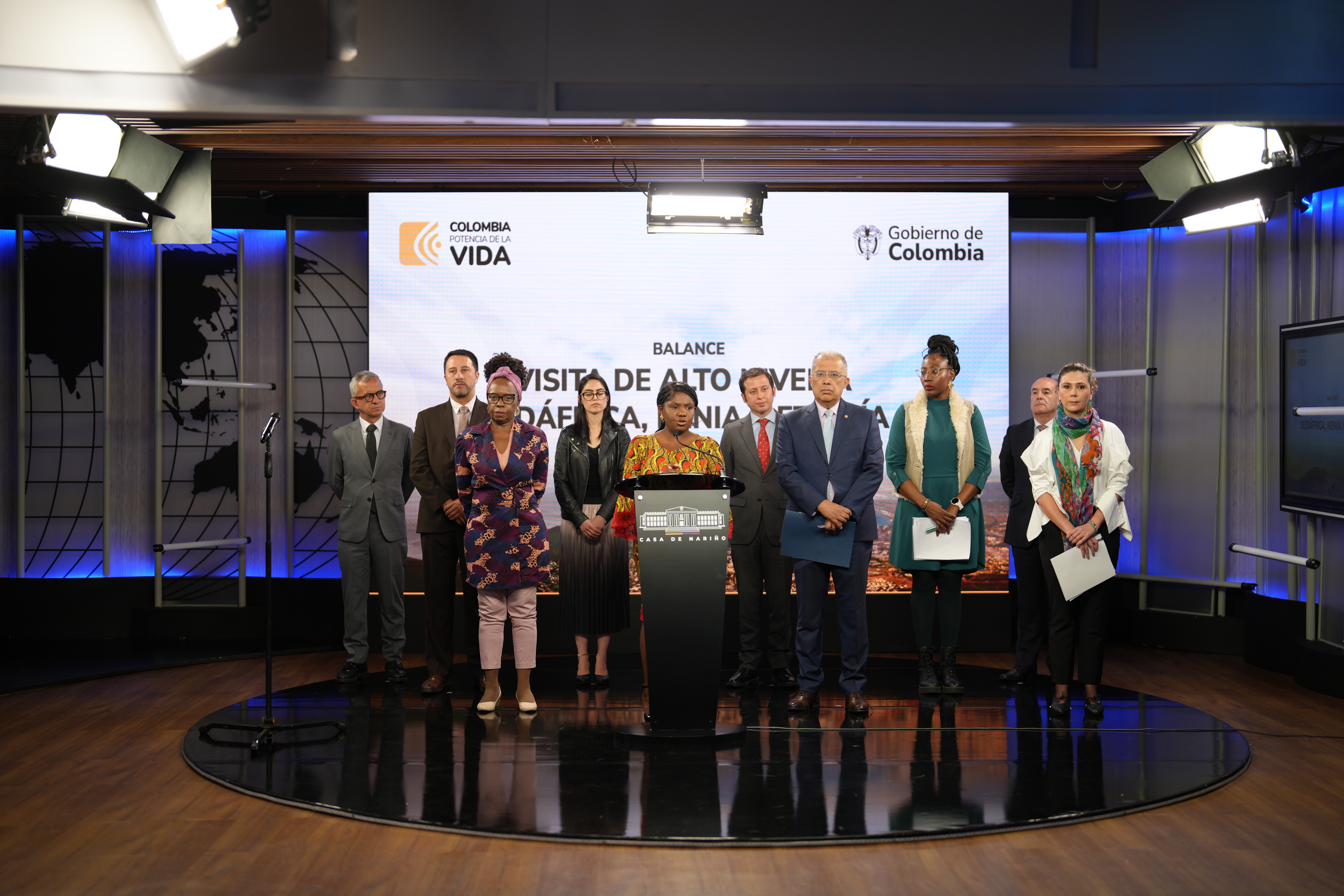
Francia Márquez, during her assessment of her state visits to South Africa, Kenya and Ethiopia.

On Saturday 1 July 2023 Márquez became the 20th member of Gustavo Petro's cabinet, assuming the office of Minister of Equality and Equity.

On Monday, 28 August 2023, Márquez received the Canadian Minister of International Development, Ahmed Hussen, at the Vice Presidential House, who ratified the Canadian government's support for gender equality projects.

Later on Tuesday, 29 August 2023, she attended her first appearance as Minister of Equality. During her first appearance before Congress, Francia Márquez attended a debate on the programs and resources that would be implemented from the National Government to attend to the social programs.

During her intervention in the Seventh Commission of the Senate, she defended the "Youth in Peace" program, used by the Gustavo Petro administration, with the purpose of dismantling the country's criminal organizations.

On Monday, 4 September, Márquez traveled to Kenya for the second time, to participate in the African Climate Summit.

On 6–7 September 2023, Márquez visited Ghana in order to strengthen relations within the framework of the Africa 2022-2026 strategy. Márquez assured that this is the first time in the 30 years of diplomatic relations with Ghana, that a meeting has taken place with leaders from Ghana and Colombia.

Later on Monday, 11 September, Márquez received an official visit from the Deputy President of Kenya, Rigathi Gachagua, who would later participate in the World Forum of Coffee Producers and Roasters.

On Tuesday, 3 October 2023, Márquez traveled to Popayán, Cauca, where she presided over an event called "the government listens" at the Coliseo Covered, of the University of Cauca, where she, and the governor of Cauca Elías Larrahondo Carabalí, received boos from many supporters who alleged incoherence on the part of the government.

On Wednesday, 29 November 2023, Márquez held a meeting with the Duchess of Edinburgh, at the Center for Memory, Peace and Reconciliation with women victims of the conflict to learn more about their reality and needs.

On 14 December 2023, Márquez held a 40-minute meeting with Pope Francis and later stated through his social networks that Pope Francis sends Colombia a message of love and joy and hope to share with the family in these Christmas. Of course, the Holy Father invites us to continue working tirelessly to achieve peace, social justice and dignity for all Colombians.

On Tuesday, 19 February 2024, Márquez held a meeting with the Mayor of Cali, Alejandro Eder and the governor of Valle del Cauca, Dilian Francisca Toro, who during the meeting highlighted the importance of strengthening the shelters that are for when a woman is raped and has the risk of femicide. The vice president expressed her concern about the recent events perpetrated in various areas of the department and provided a balance of the cities that have reported femicides in Valle del Cauca

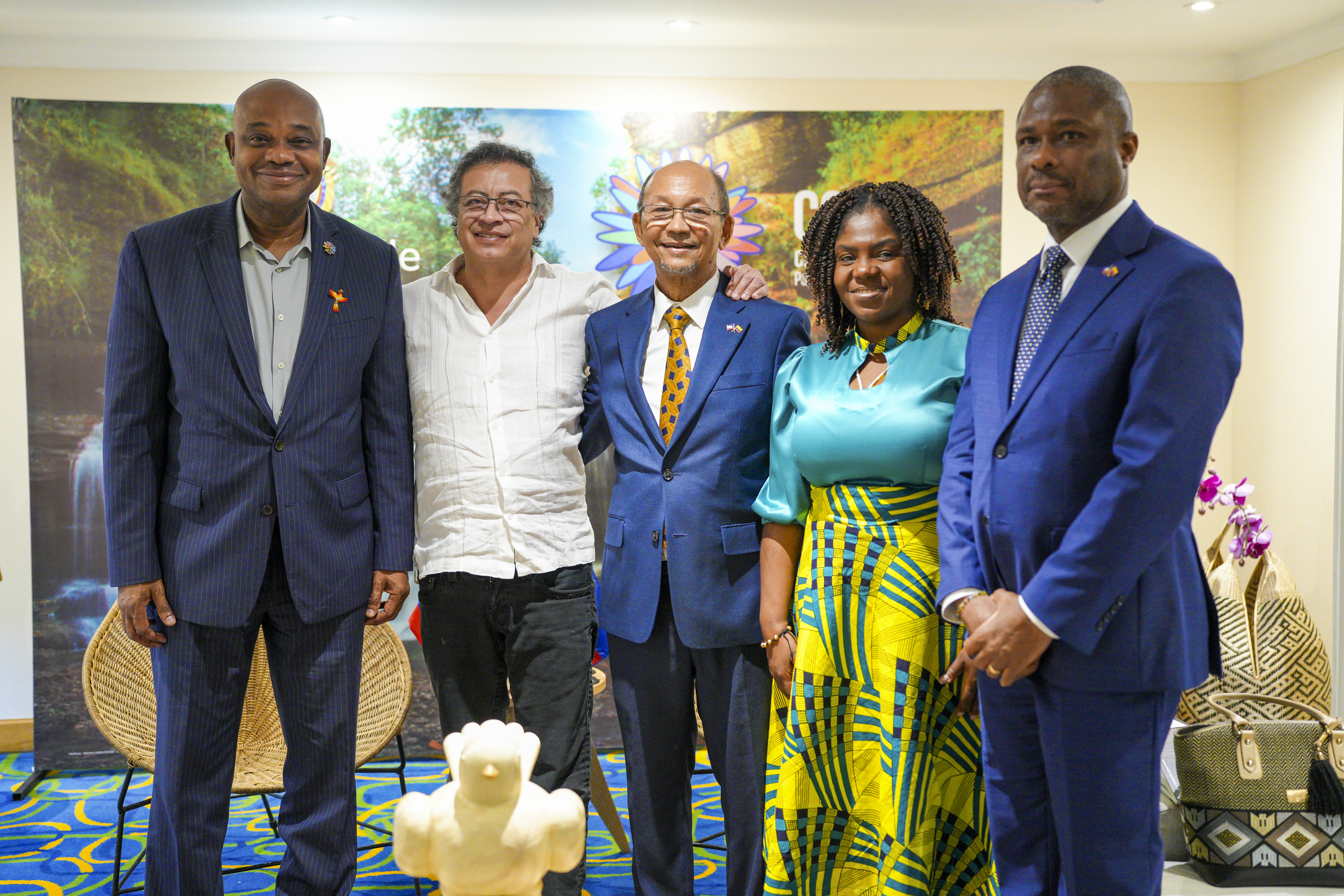
Vice President Francia Márquez with President Gustavo Petro, Minister of Foreign Affairs, Luis Gilberto Murillo and Chair of the Transitional Presidential Council of Haiti Leslie Voltaire during the 2024 United Nations Biodiversity Conference

On Wednesday, 1 May 2024, Márquez participated in the day of marches for pension reform within the framework of the celebrations of International Workers' Day. Where from a platform accompanied by the Minister of the Environment, Susana Muhamad and the General Director of DPN, Alexander López Maya, she made a speech in which she referred to the people, and in which she mentioned the former vice president Francisco Santos, who had expressed that the presence of indigenous peoples in the marches was nothing more than a product of the financing of the Petro administration to which Márquez responded: "To Mr. former Vice President Francisco Santos, the indigenous people are not rented," after he had made a publication in his X account where he said that the indigenous people were rented for the marches.

In August 2024, Márquez received a visit from the Duke and Duchess of Sussex, as part of an invitation made by her to the Duchess.

== Policies and views ==
=== Foreign affairs ===
In February 2023, she will make her first official visit, with Cuba as the selected country. This visit demonstrated the Petro administration's commitment to peace, respect, and the determination of the people. Márquez stated, "Returning to Cuba as Vice President of the Republic of Colombia, after having come a few years ago as a member of the victims' panel in the peace talks between the Colombian State and the FARC, is evidence that in Colombia we are making our desire for complete peace a reality. Of course, Cuba's role in that journey has been fundamental."

After assuming the position of Vice President, Márquez emphasized her commitment to strengthening the relationship between Colombia and Africa, a continent she called the cradle of humanity. In May 2023, she embarked on a tour consisting of three state visits to South Africa, Kenya, and Ethiopia, which would later be known as the Africa Strategy 2022-2026. Her agenda included meetings with the Deputy President of South Africa, the Deputy President of Kenya, and the President of Ethiopia.

== Personal life ==
Márquez is the daughter of a miner father and farmer mother. Márquez described her childhood as "marked by spending time at my maternal grandparents' house, another time with my mother, and the rest with my paternal grandparents."

Márquez is an agricultural technician and graduated from the National Learning Service. Later in 2020 she would obtain a law degree from the Santiago de Cali University. In 2023, she received an honorary doctorate in education (honoris causa) from the National Pedagogical University of Colombia.

== Awards ==
In 2018, she was awarded the Goldman Environmental Prize for her work to stop illegal gold mining in her community of La Toma and for her community organising.

== Notes ==
Party political offices
Preceded by Aída Avella	Democratic Pole nominee for Vice President of Colombia; 2022	Succeeded by Aida Quilcué
New political alliance	Historic Pact nominee for Vice President of Colombia; 2022	Succeeded by Aida Quilcué
Political offices
Preceded by Marta Lucía Ramírez	Vice President of Colombia; 2022–2026	Succeeded by José Manuel Restrepo
New office	Minister of Equality and Equity; 2023–2025	Succeeded by Carlos Rosero
