= Luz María Zapata =

Colombian politician (born 1967)

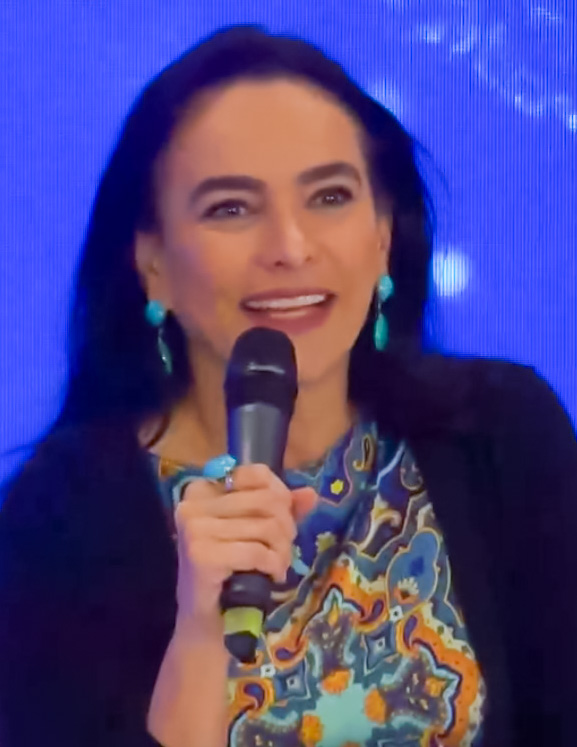
- Zapata in 2024

Second Lady of Colombia
- In role August 7, 2014 – March 11, 2017
- Vice President: Germán Vargas Lleras
- Preceded by: Montserrat Muñoz de Garzón
- Succeeded by: Claudia Luque

Personal details
- Born: Luz María Zapata Zapata; September 2, 1967 (age 58) Pereira, Risaralda, Colombia
- Party: Independent (2022–present)
- Other political affiliations: Radical Change (2010-2022)
- Spouse: Germán Vargas Lleras (m. 2010; div. 2023)
- Education: University of the Andes (BSc)

Luz María Zapata Zapata (born September 2, 1967) is a Colombian politician who served as Second Lady of Colombia from 2014 to 2017, and President of Asocapitales from 2018 to 2025. She was married to the Vice President of Colombia, Germán Vargas Lleras.

Graduate of the University of the Andes with a degree in political science, she holds a Master’s in Emotional Intelligence and Well-being from Universidad del Rosario and completed both the Combating Transnational Threat Networks Course at the National Defense University and The Art and Practice of Leadership Development at Harvard University.

== Early life and marriage ==
Luz María Zapata Zapata was born on September 2, 1967, in Pereira, Risaralda. Her mother, Luz Mary Zapata de Zapata, is the founder of the Green Civic Movement. She studied Political Science at the University of the Andes, where she met Germán Vargas Lleras, whom she married in August 2010.

In 2014, Zapata campaigned alongside Vargas Lleras during the 2014 presidential election. After the Santos-Vargas Lleras ticket won, Zapata assumed the role of social hostess at the Vice Presidential House as second lady. With limited public appearances, she focused more on her role as an advisor to the vice president while simultaneously serving as executive director of the Colombian Association of Liquor Companies, a position she held for 14 years. She is the first second lady of Colombia to hold a job while her husband is vice president. In 2017, after Vargas Lleras resigned to run for president in the 2018 presidential election, Zapata returned to public life, this time with a more active role, even describing Vargas Lleras as "the best prepared of them all."

She worked as a social and political advisor for the Good Governance Foundation. She later served as coordinator of social and women's policies in presidential campaigns and as a researcher at the Organization of Ibero-American States.

In 2024, she published her autobiography, "Rolaisa," which covers her life, achievements, and the participation of women in politics.

== 2026 presidential election ==
=== Presidential campaign ===
On July 8, 2025, Zapata registered her candidacy with the National Civil Registry of Colombia by collecting signatures.

In March 2026, Zapata accepted the nomination to be Minister Luis Gilberto Murillo's running mate. Once the Murillo-Zapata ticket was officially announced, they actively campaigned on social media and traveling across the country.

Honorary titles
Preceded by Montserrat Muñoz de Garzón	Second Lady of Colombia; 2014–2017	Succeeded by Claudia Luque
