= María Mercedes Cabal =

Wife of Manuel María Mallarino

- Born: María Mercedes Cabal Borrero; 25 September 1819; Buga, Cauca Valley, New Granada
- Died: 4 May 1904 (aged 84); Bogotá, Cundinamarca, Colombia
- Known for: Spouse of the president of the New Granada (1855–1857); Spouse of the vice president of the New Granada (1855–1859)
- Spouse: Manuel María Mallarino

María Mercedes Cabal Borrero (25 September 1819 - 4 May 1904) was the wife of the Vice President Manuel Mallarino. Daughter of Mr. Víctor Cabal Molina, a wealthy landowner and politician, and Mrs. María Petrona Borrero Costa, she owes her fame not only to her husband's notoriety, but also to the fact that various authors affirm that she was the inspiration for the protagonist in the novel María by Jorge Isaacs.

From 1855 to 1857, her husband served as acting president.

Unofficial roles
| Preceded by Ana María Gallegos | Spouse of the vice president of the New Granada; 1855–1859 | Position abolished |
| Preceded by Ana María Gallegos | Spouse of the president of the New Granada; 1855–1857 | Succeeded by Enriqueta Vásquez de Ospina |
