= Enriqueta Vásquez de Ospina =

Businesswoman and wife of President Mariano Ospina Rodríguez (1832-1886)

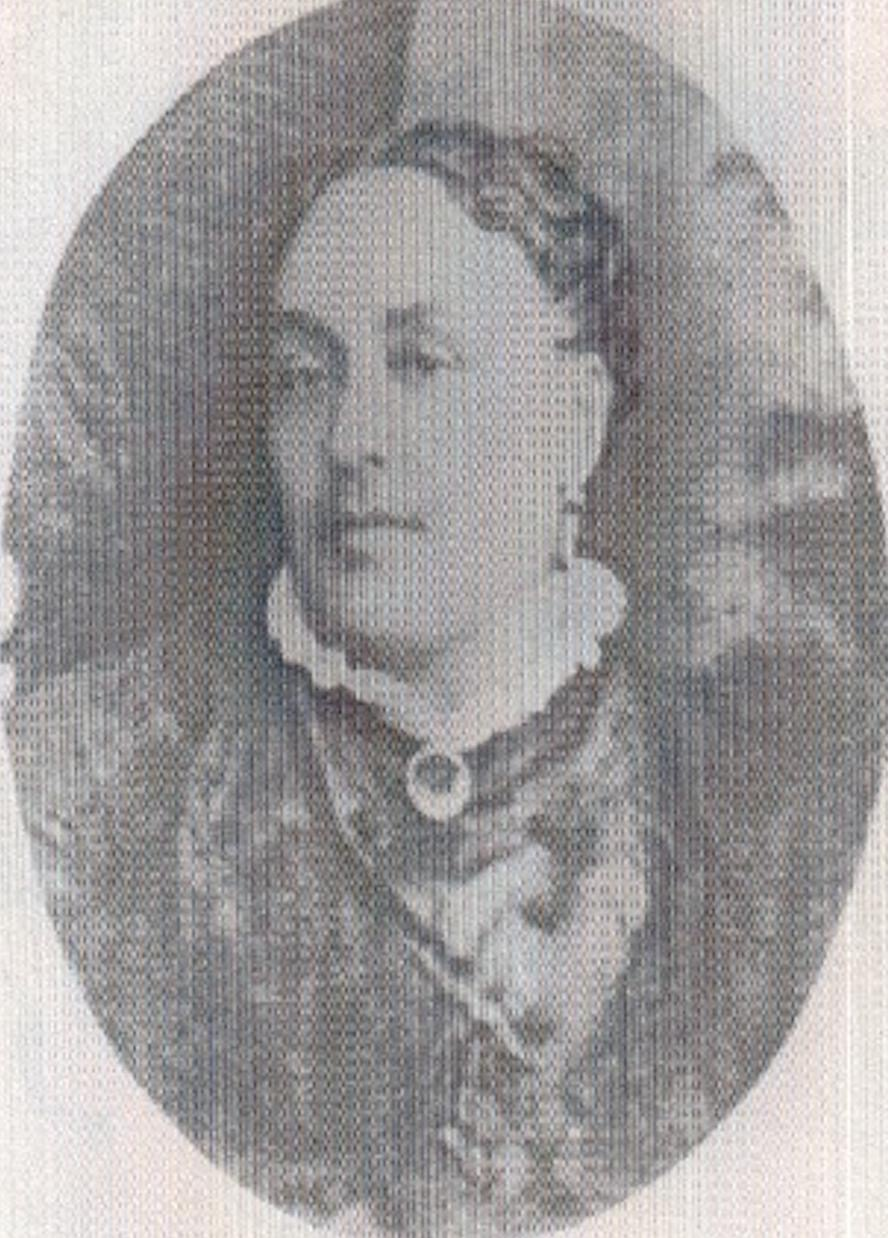
- c. 1880.
- Born: Enriqueta Vásquez Jaramillo; 1832; Medellín, Antioquia, New Granada
- Died: December 10, 1886 (aged 53–54); Medellín, Antioquía, Colombia
- Resting place: San Pedro Cemetery Museum
- Known for: Spouse of the president of the Granadine Confederation (1858–1861)
- Political party: Conservative
- Spouse: Mariano Ospina Rodríguez (m. 1855; died 1885)
- Children: Tulio; Pedro; Santiago; María; Mariano

Enriqueta Vásquez de Ospina (née Vásquez Jaramillo; c. 1832 – December 10, 1886) was a businesswoman and the wife of Mariano Ospina Rodríguez, first President of the Granadine Confederation from 1858 to 1861. Among her children are Pedro Nel Ospina, the 11th president of Colombia, and Mariano Ospina Vázquez, the minister of War under Carlos Eugenio Restrepo. Vásquez de Ospina, María Michelsen de López and María Cristina Arango are the only three women to be the wife of one Colombian president and the mother of another.

Enriqueta Vásquez Jaramillo was born in the city of Medellín. She met Mariano Ospina Rodríguez at the age of twenty-two and they married in 1855. The couple had five children between 1857 and 1868. Vásquez de Ospina assumed the role of social hostess at the San Carlos Palace during her husband's term as president of the Granadine Confederation and during the country's transition from the New Granada to the Granadine Confederation in 1858.

== Early life, marriage and children ==
Born into the Vásquez family, she attended business school in her youth and grew up in a family with strict Catholic values. At twenty-two, she married Mariano Ospina Rodríguez. After the death of her father, Pedro Vásquez, she and her mother, María Antonia Jaramillo, inherited several properties in Antioquia and Cundinamarca, including mines and land for cattle ranching. Among her investments, Vásquez de Ospina spearheaded the large-scale importation of products from England and Wales. She was represented in her business dealings by her brother, Eduardo Vásquez.

== Footnotes ==
=== References ===
- Gil Restrepo, Piedad (2003). Biografía de una matrona antioqueña : Enriqueta Vásquez de Ospina, 1832-1886 / Piedad Gil Restrepo. Bank of the Republic. ISBN 978-0-688-10562-4.
- Mejía Cubillos, Javier (2012). Diccionario Biográfico y Genealógico de la élite antioqueña y viejocaldense. Segunda mitad del siglo XIX y primera del XX (PDF). Red Alma Mater. pp. 221–222. ISBN 978-958-57364-0-5. Archived from the original (PDF) on October 24, 2013.
- Molina Londoño, Luis Fernando (December 19, 2025). "Emprendimiento Mosaico de Emprendedoras". Semana.
- Gallini, Estefanía (2006). "Empresarios antioqueños en la historia del café en Guatemala, 1863-1871" (PDF). Anuario Colombiano de Historia Social y de la Cultura (33). National University of Colombia: 247–285. ISSN 0120-2456. OCLC 8539707057.

Unofficial roles
Preceded by María Mercedes Cabal	Spouse of the president of Granadine Confederation; 1858–1861	Succeeded by Sofía Mosquera de Arboleda
