= Hostess of San Carlos Palace =

Spouse of the Head of State of Colombia (1797-1886)

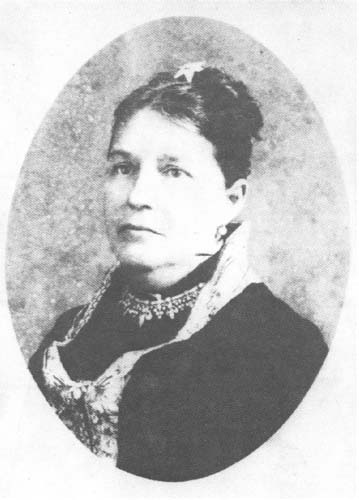
- Last in role Soledad Román de Núñez until April 1, 1886
- Style: Madam
- Residence: San Carlos Palace
- Inaugural holder: Manuela Sáenz

The Hostess of San Carlos Palace was the unofficial position held by the wives of the presidents in the now-defunct states of Gran Colombia, New Granada, the Granadine Confederation, and the United States of Colombia. This role is considered the precursor to the role of First Lady of Colombia, which was formalized in 1886 with the founding of Colombia. Although the president's spouse was neither elected nor received compensation, the Hostesses of San Carlos Palace played significant roles in Colombian society at that time.

For 89 years, twenty-one women, including the president's wives and partners, served as hostesses at the San Carlos Palace, a position derived from republican tradition and based solely on the prominence and influence of the individual. This role was the subject of debate on two occasions: first, when Manuela Sáenz, Simón Bolívar's partner, was accused of being the president's mistress while still married to Captain James Thorne; and second, when Soledad Román de Núñez was rejected by Bogotá's upper class because her husband, Rafael Núñez, remained married to his first wife, Dolores Gallegos.

== List ==
Portrait	Name	Tenure	President (Husband or Partner, unless noted)
	Manuela Sáenz; December 27, 1797 – November 23, 1856	16 February 1819 – 27 April 1830	Simón Bolívar
	María Josefa Hurtado	May 12, 1833 – April 1, 1835	Joaquín Mosquera
	Dolores Vargas París	September 4, 1830 – April 30, 1831	Rafael Urdaneta
	Sixta Pontón de Santander; April 2, 1792 – July 20, 1862	October 7, 1832 – April 1, 1837	Francisco de Paula Santander
	María Antonia del Castillo	April 1, 1837 – April 1, 1841	José Ignacio de Márquez
	Amelia Mosquera Arboleda	April 1, 1841 – April 1, 1845	Pedro Alcántara Herrán
	Mariana Benvenuta de Mosquera	April 1, 1845 – April 1, 1849	Tomás Cipriano de Mosquera
	María Dorotea Durán	April 1, 1849 – April 1, 1853	José Hilario López
	Timotea Carvajal de Oabando	April 1, 1853 – April 17, 1854	José María Obando
	María Mercedes Cabal; September 25, 1819 – May 4, 1904	August 7, 1855 – August 7, 1857	Manuel María Mallarino
Enriqueta Vásquez de Ospina	Enriqueta Vásquez de Ospina	May 22, 1857 − March 31, 1861	Mariano Ospina Rodríguez
Portrait of Sofía Mosquera	Sofía Mosquera de Arboleda	July 10, 1861 − July 18, 1861; Acting	Julio Arboleda Pombo
	Mariana Benvenuta de Mosquera	July 18, 1861 − April 8, 1864	Tomás Cipriano de Mosquera
	Ana Roma de Murillo	April 8, 1864 − April 1, 1866	Manuel Murillo Toro
	Hermelina Concha de Gutiérrez	April 1, 1968 − April 1, 1870	Santos Gutiérrez
	Sinforosa Florez Mateus	April 1, 1870 − April 1, 1872	Eustorgio Salgar
	Ana Roma de Muerillo	April 1, 1872 − April 1, 1874	Manuel Murillo Toro
	Tadea Triana Silva	April 1, 1874 − April 1, 1876	Santiago Pérez Manosalva
	Lastenia Díaz Murillo	April 1, 1976 − April 1, 1878	Aquileo Parra
	Dolores Carvajal Murillo	April 1, 1878 − April 1, 1880	Julián Trujillo Largacha
Portrait de Soledad Román de Núñez, seconde femme de Rafael Núñez, président de Colombie.	Soledad Román de Núñez; October 6, 1835 – June 19, 1924	April 1, 1880 − April 1, 1882	Rafael Núñez m. July 14, 1877
	Dolores Orbegozo de Zaldúa	April 1, 1882 − December 21, 1882	Francisco Javier Zaldúa
	Mercedes González de Otálora	December 21, 1882 − April 1, 1884	José Eusebio Otalora
Portrait de Soledad Román de Núñez, seconde femme de Rafael Núñez, président de Colombie.	Soledad Román de Núñez; October 6, 1835 – June 19, 1924	April 1, 1884 − April 1, 1886	Rafael Núñez m. July 14, 1877

== See also ==
- First Lady
- List of first ladies of Colombia
