= Sixta Pontón de Santander =

Wife of Francisco de Paula Santander

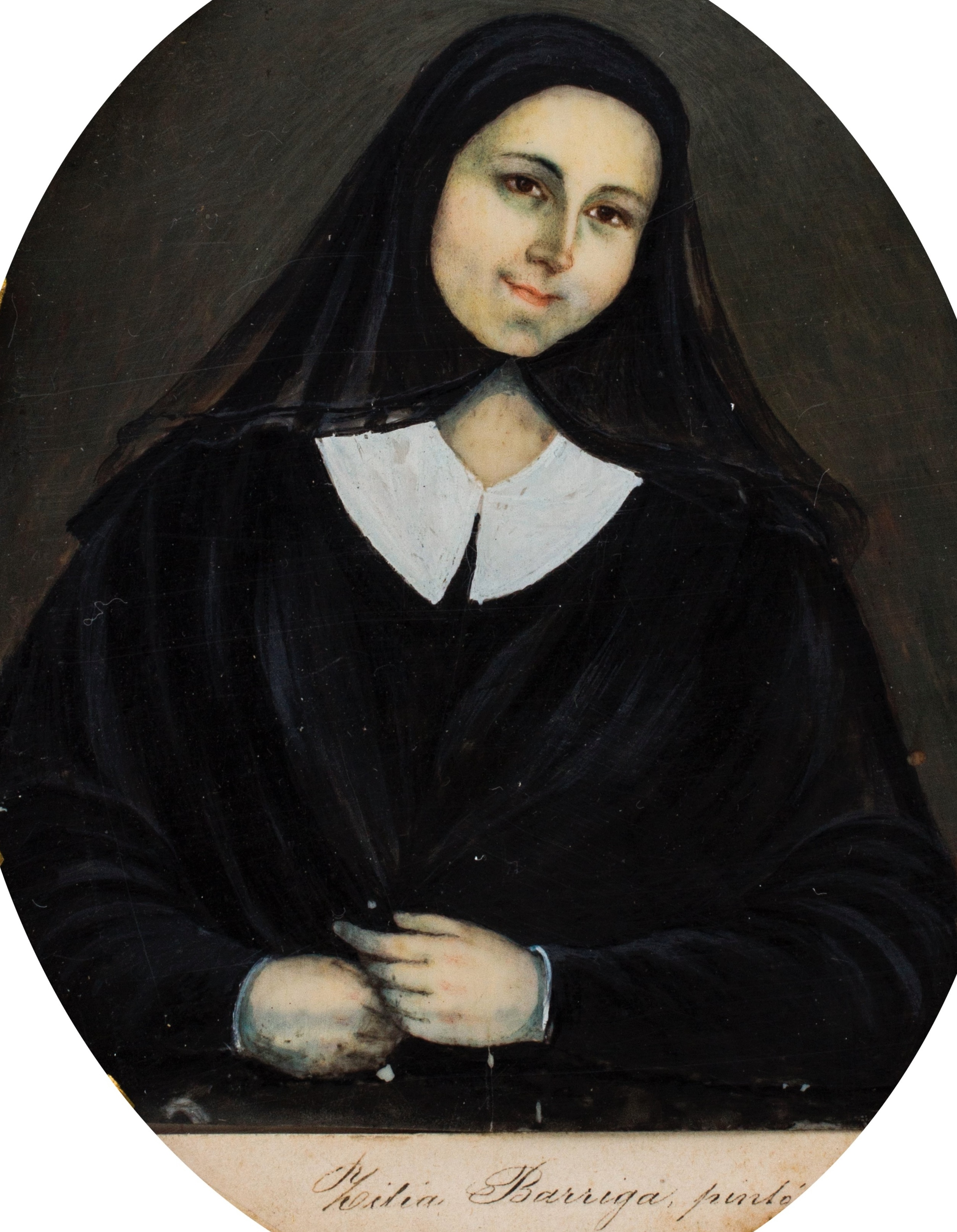
- Portrait of Sixta Pontón de Santander circa 1856
- Born: Sixta Pontón Vargas Piedrahíta; April 2, 1792; Soacha, Bogotá Province, Spanish Colombia
- Died: July 28, 1862 (aged 70); Bogotá, Granadine Confederation
- Known for: Spouse of the president of the New Granada (1832–1837); Spouse of the vice president of the Gran Colombia (1821–1827)
- Spouse: Francisco de Paula Santander (m. 1836)
- Children: Juan; Clemencia; Sixta Tulia
- Parent(s): Mario Pontón Vargas (father); Francisca Piedrahíta (mother)

Sixta Pontón de Santander (April 2, 1792 –July 28, 1862) was a Colombian philanthropist and politician. She was also the wife of Francisco de Paula Santander.

Unofficial roles
Preceded by Teresa Rivas Arce	Spouse of the vice president of the Gran Colombia; 1821–1827	Succeeded by Juana Jurado de Caicedo
New title	Spouse of the president of the New Granada; 1832–1837	Succeeded by María Antonia del Castillo
