= World Coffee Producers Forum =

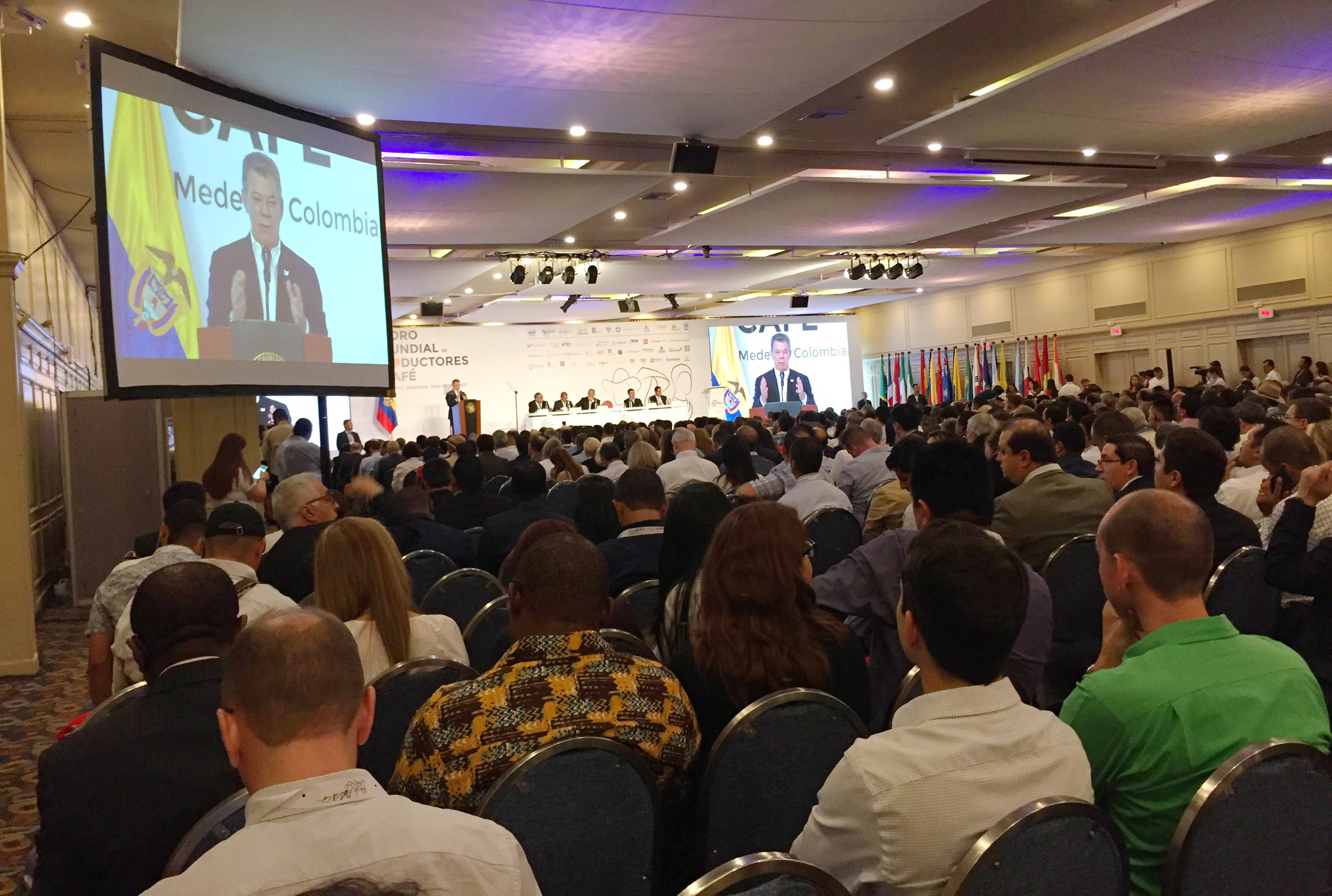
Colombian President Juan Manuel Santos addresses the first World Coffee Producers Forum in 2017

The World Coffee Producers Forum (WCPF) is a not-for-profit organization formed to analyze and address the challenges faced by the coffee value chain, especially in regards to those who grow and produce the raw, un-roasted product.

The first event was held in Medellín, Colombia in 2017 and produced a Final Declaration document containing seven resolutions, including a resolution to create an Action Plan for addressing very low prices to producers. The event had representatives from roughly 40 different coffee-producing countries from around the world, as well as several dignitaries. The titles of many of the speakers lends credence to the importance this forum has to the coffee sector. Notable speakers included former U.S. president Bill Clinton and former Colombian president Juan Manuel Santos.

The importance of coffee farming in coffee-producing countries was emphasized throughout the conference and President Clinton consistently used the theme of 'coffee as an anchor for development.' He further explained that 'coffee as an anchor' meant that supporting the coffee industry through investments in training and infrastructure would ultimately benefit the impoverished farmers who produce coffee. Because of the socio-economic importance of coffee in these regions, a stable coffee industry will serve as a stabilizing factor—an anchor—for further development.

So I think that we need to see coffee as the anchor of a more stable, rural society, that in a troubled area like Colombia can help people move away from terror and violence and an economically distressed area can help people make a living where they grew up and not have to move to cities, putting more pressure on the strained resources of government. And I think we have to do it, given the details are different in country-to-country, with constant training and more affordable, if we buy in volume, more affordable inputs and then better supply and distribution chains.

— Bill Clinton, Former US President, Audio recording; WCPF, 2017. Medellin, Colombia. 11 July 2017.

The socio-economic importance of coffee production is derived from the fact that 70-80% of the world's coffee is produced by smallholders (working roughly 2 hectares or 5 acres of land) and in many countries the coffee industry contributes less than 10% to GDP. These numbers describe poverty conditions for the smallholders—conditions that can be partially addressed through broad support from government and non-governmental organizations. The focus of the forum was to explore what that support should look like.

== History ==
The WCPF first met in Medellín, Colombia, in July 2017. With close to 1,500 attendees from more than 40 countries, the main focus of the forum was to discuss a range of topics concerning the sustainability of the global coffee value chain and the decline of coffee farmers’ incomes. Among the topics discussed was the need to take action to improve producers’ incomes through joint work with the entire supply chain on initiatives that will translate into increased consumption and higher coffee prices. Other topics addressed at the meeting included the consequences of climate change and measures to enhance productivity in coffee-producing countries.

In April 2018, it was announced that the executive committee of the WCPF has started the process of formalizing the structure of the WCPF as a not-for-profit. The non profit will represent the economic stability of coffee farmers. It will address and raise awareness of the challenges of the coffee value chain, especially those related to the economic and social situation of coffee growers.

== Events ==
=== 2017 ===
The first forum was held in Medellín, Colombia, in July 2017 and consisted of close to 1,500 attendees from over 40 different coffee-producing countries. Speakers and panelists included industry leaders, economists, analysts, leaders of several Latin American countries, as well as former US President Bill Clinton.

The keynote speaker was Prof. Jeffrey D. Sachs. As a coordinator of the forum, the Colombian Coffee Growers Federation (FNC) in New York commissioned the Columbia Center for Sustainable Investments (CCSI) under the leadership of Professor Sachs a study about "Economic and Policy Analysis for Improving Smallholder Coffee Producers' Income". The conclusions will be presented at the WCPF meeting in Campinas by Professor Sachs.

The focus of the forum was the intersection of coffee and sustainable development, specifically economic sustainability, rural development and socioeconomic indicators, and adaptation to climate change. The forum explored these topics through moderated panel discussions on the first day and focused working groups on the second day. This conversational structure of the forum was meant to encourage dialogue between experts and the attendees, many of whom were coffee farmers from around the world, rather than a simple transfer of information, such as a lecture.

=== 2019 ===
With the announcement of the intent to form a not-for-profit, the next event was scheduled for July 10 and 11. It took place in Campinas, Brazil. At the event, the organization issued a final declaration in Campinas on 11 July 2019, stating in part, that there is a "worldwide awareness to the need for economic sustainability in global coffee supply".
