= Santiago de Cali University =

Private university located in Cali, Cauca Valley

Coordinates: 3.403412°N 76.547719°W

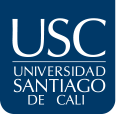
- Motto: Transformación y buen gobierno
- Motto in English: Transformation and good governance
- Type: Private university
- Established: October 16, 1958; 67 years ago
- Director: Carlos Andrés Pérez Galindo
- Students: 21,000 (2021-2022)
- Location: Cali, Valle del Cauca, Colombia
- Campus: Suburban 30 acres (12 ha)
- Colors: Blue - White
- Website: www.usc.edu.co

The Santiago de Cali University (USC) is a private university, subject to inspection and surveillance through the Ministry of National Education of Colombia. Located in southwestern Colombia, with a main office in the Pampalinda neighborhood, and another office in the Santa Rosa neighborhood in the center of the city, in Cali. In addition to its main headquarters, it has a branch in Palmira, Cauca Valley.
