= Suárez, Cauca =

Coordinates: 2.95889°N 76.6953°W

Suarez, Cauca
- Municipality and town
- Holidays in Suárez

- Flag Coat of arms

- Location of the municipality and town of Suarez, Cauca in the Cauca Department of Colombia.
- Country: Colombia
- Department: Cauca Department

Population (Census 2018)
  - Total: 19,690
- Time zone: UTC-5 (Colombia Standard Time)
- Climate: Af

Suárez (Spanish pronunciation: [ˈswaɾes]) is a town and municipality in the Cauca Department, Colombia.

In October 2007 a gold mine near the town collapsed, killing at least 24 people.

== Climate ==
Climate data for Suárez (Salvajina La), elevation 1,130 m (3,710 ft), (1971–2000)
| Month | Jan | Feb | Mar | Apr | May | Jun | Jul | Aug | Sep | Oct | Nov | Dec | Year |
|---|---|---|---|---|---|---|---|---|---|---|---|---|---|
| Mean daily maximum °C (°F) | 28.7 (83.7) | 29.0 (84.2) | 29.2 (84.6) | 28.5 (83.3) | 27.6 (81.7) | 28.5 (83.3) | 29.7 (85.5) | 30.1 (86.2) | 29.2 (84.6) | 28.2 (82.8) | 27.6 (81.7) | 27.7 (81.9) | 28.7 (83.7) |
| Daily mean °C (°F) | 23.2 (73.8) | 23.0 (73.4) | 23.3 (73.9) | 22.9 (73.2) | 22.6 (72.7) | 23.0 (73.4) | 23.5 (74.3) | 23.6 (74.5) | 23.3 (73.9) | 22.8 (73.0) | 23.0 (73.4) | 23.0 (73.4) | 23.1 (73.6) |
| Mean daily minimum °C (°F) | 18.1 (64.6) | 18.2 (64.8) | 18.4 (65.1) | 18.5 (65.3) | 18.4 (65.1) | 17.7 (63.9) | 16.5 (61.7) | 16.7 (62.1) | 17.3 (63.1) | 18.1 (64.6) | 18.4 (65.1) | 18.2 (64.8) | 17.9 (64.2) |
| Average precipitation mm (inches) | 162.2 (6.39) | 162.3 (6.39) | 212.3 (8.36) | 269.1 (10.59) | 244.2 (9.61) | 147.9 (5.82) | 87.5 (3.44) | 99.8 (3.93) | 188.3 (7.41) | 279.8 (11.02) | 293.2 (11.54) | 224.0 (8.82) | 2,370.6 (93.33) |
| Average precipitation days | 15 | 15 | 17 | 20 | 20 | 15 | 11 | 11 | 16 | 22 | 21 | 18 | 202 |
Source: Instituto de Hidrologia Meteorologia y Estudios Ambientales
