= Vice President of Colombia =

Second-highest constitutional office in Colombia

Vice President of the Republic of Colombia
- Vicepresidente de la República de Colombia
- National flag

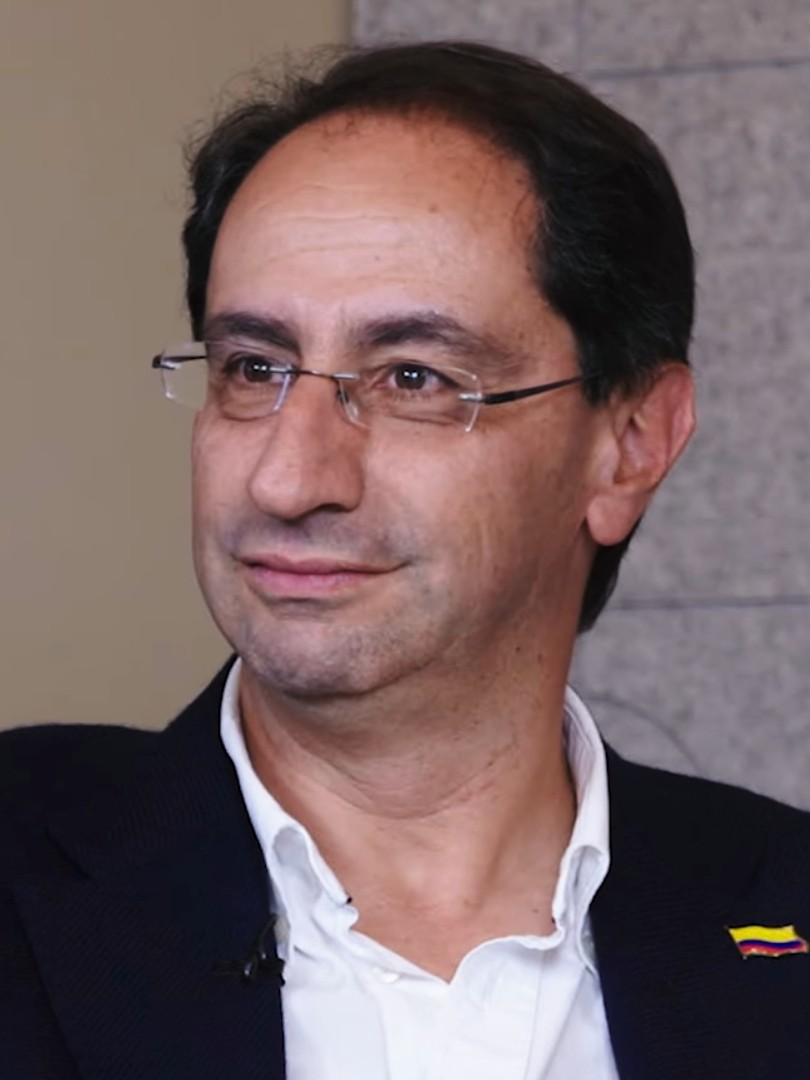
- Incumbent; José Manuel Restrepo since 7 August 2026
- Government of Colombia; Executive Branch of Colombia
- Style: Mr. Vice President (informal); The Honorable (formal); His Excellency (diplomatic)
- Status: Second highest executive branch officer
- Member of: Cabinet; National Government; National Economic Council
- Residence: Vice Presidential House
- Seat: Bogotá, D.C.
- Appointer: Popular vote, or, if vacant, President via Constitutional
- Term length: Four years, non renewable
- Constituting instrument: Constitution of Colombia
- Precursor: Presidential Designate
- Formation: 17 December 1819 (206 years ago)
- First holder: Francisco Antonio Zea
- Succession: First
- Unofficial names: VPDTE-CO, VP, Vice
- Salary: Colombian pesos 15,900,569/US$ 4044,26 monthly
- Website: vicepresidencia.gov.co

The vice president of Colombia (Vice president of the Republic) is the second-highest officer in the executive branch of the national government, after the president of Colombia, and ranks first in the presidential line of succession. The vice president is indirectly elected together with the president to a four-year term of office by the people of Colombia through the Popular Vote. Since the passage of the Article 102 Amendment (in 1991) to the Colombian Constitution, the vice president may also be appointed by the president to fill a vacancy, upon leave of absence or death, resignation, or removal of the president. Since the 1990s, the vice president has been afforded an official residence at the Vice Presidential House of Bogotá, D.C.

The vice president cannot assume presidential functions on temporary absences of the president such as official trips abroad or vacations. In these cases, the president delegates functions to a cabinet member, usually the Minister of the Interior.

According to the Constitution of Colombia of 1991, in the event that the vice president is absent, Congress must meet by its own right or by convocation of the president, in order to choose who would be the next person to occupy this position.

José Manuel Restrepo is the 14th and current vice president of Colombia. He took office on 7 August 2026.

== History and development ==
=== Constitutional Convention ===
The position of vice president was not mentioned in the Constitutional Convention that gave rise to the Constitution of Cúcuta in 1821, where it was established that the country would be governed by a president for a period of 4 years and that, in the event of temporary or permanent absence, he would be replaced by the vice president, who would also be the head of the Governing Council. The first presidency was in the hands of Simón Bolívar, while Francisco de Paula Santander was appointed as vice president. the different visions of the State -one of law and the other of dictatorship. While Bolívar carried out the southern campaign -in which the freedom of Ecuador, Peru and Bolivia was achieved-, Santander assumed the full powers of the presidency.

In the absence of Simón Bolívar, Santander was in charge of legally organizing the nascent country and organized the administration of justice. Likewise, he promoted education, of a Lancasterian nature, and fought to remove the monopoly of education from the Catholic Church. The Santanderist measures were not to the liking of Simón Bolívar, who classified them as an abuse of power.

In 1826, in his speech before the Constituent Congress of Bolivia, Bolívar hinted at the differences that separated him from his former comrade in arms: "The vice president must be the purest man: the reason is that if the Prime Magistrate does not elect a very upright citizen should fear him as a bitter enemy; and suspect even of his secret ambitions. This vice president must strive to deserve his good services the credit he needs to perform the highest functions and expect the great national reward: the supreme command "

Santander held power until 1827, when Simón Bolívar returned from his campaigns. Almost a year later, and faced with so many clashes of criteria with his second in command, Bolívar ended the figure of the vice president and suspended the Constitution of Cúcuta, to make way for the dictatorship. The authoritarian government of Bolívar did not last long and in 1830 the Admirable Congress was convened to draft a new constitution that sought to govern a Gran Colombia that was already disintegrating.

=== Early vice presidents and functions ===
The Constitution of 1830 returned to resume the figure of the vice president and was even sanctioned by the vice president in charge at that time, General Domingo Caycedo. This text did not last long before the disintegration of Gran Colombia and gave way to the Constitution of 1832, which changed the rules for the vice-presidency, because, taking into account what happened between Santander and Bolívar, it was established that vice president be elected two years later. of the president.

This alternate election, which allowed the vice president to be there for two administrations, was proposed to avoid rivalries. In addition, it was established that the vice president would be in charge of presiding over the Council of State, a body that at that time was consultative in nature to advise the president in decision-making.

Between 1832 and 1858 the country faced various civil wars -such as the War of the Supreme Court-, suffered coups -such as that of José María Melo and had several constituent texts, but always had the figure of the vice president. However, in the Constitution of 1858, of a liberal nature, the questioned figure was knocked down and three appointees were given the opportunity to replace the president in his absence.

Given the liberal intention of having a restricted Executive power, the figure of the vice president did not fit into the Colombian order, for which reason it only came to be rescued in 1886, with the regeneration. The new conservative constitution once again brought the figure of the vice president to the Colombian legal system. Rafael Núñez took advantage of this figure to get himself elected and leave his vice president in power.

=== Emergence of the modern vice presidency ===
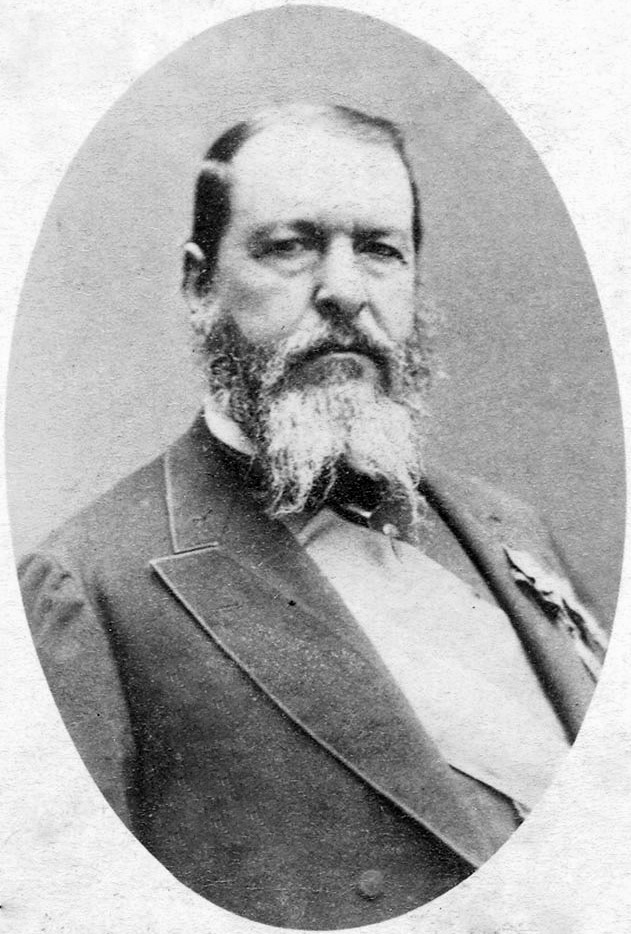
Eliseo Payán, 1st vice president of Colombia.

The first on this list was Eliseo Payan, who was vice president in 1886, but he was promptly removed due to his closeness to liberal federalist ideas, which clashed with the thought of regeneration. The position was assumed by Miguel Antonio Caro, who for many was the power behind the throne during the Núñez government: the first president retired to his El Cabrero hacienda, in Cartagena, while Caro governed. Even with the death of Núñez in 1894, Caro continued to lead the country for two more years.

The government of Núñez -or of Caro to be more precise- was followed by the conservative Manuel Antonio Sanclemente, elected to the presidency in 1898. He arrived at the first magistracy at the age of 84 and had the bad luck that during his tenure the War of the Thousand Days. Given the weakness of the government, Vice President José Manuel Marroquín was encouraged by the conservatives themselves to launch a coup, which occurred on July 31, 1900.

Marroquín was succeeded by Rafael Reyes. At that time, the position of the vice presidency was respected and had great political value, which even served as a counterweight to the president. That is why Reyes, in his authoritarian desire, ended the figure of the vice presidency in 1905, at the same time that he ordered the closure of Congress. Faced with a possible lack of the first president, it was the ministers who had to choose his replacement, despite the fact that the constitutional order returned with the resignation of Rafael Reyes in 1810, the vice presidency was not reestablished. The history of disputes and the Marroquín coup convinced Congress that the best option was for the Legislature to establish appointees in the absence of the president.

== Constitutional roles ==
=== Successor to the president ===
In absence of both the president and the vice president, Article 203 of the Constitution of Colombia establishes that the presidential office will be assumed by a minister in the order of precedence established by law. The assuming minister has to be a member of the same party or movement the original president belonged to, and will exercise the presidency until the Congress, within the 30 days following the presidential vacancy, elects a new vice president who will assume the presidency.

=== Constitutional mandate ===
According to the Decree 2719 of 17 December 2000 in the Colombian Constitution of 1991 which modified the structure of the Administrative Department of the Presidency of the Republic, the functions of the vice president are:

1. To execute special missions set by the president of Colombia and in accordance with the Colombian Constitution.
2. Advise the president on the execution of policies and politics regarding Human Rights and Corruption.
3. Collaborate with the Colombian government's management of international and national activities regarding Human Rights and corruption.
4. Plan mechanisms to harmonize agreements between the different levels of the executive government in Colombia on issues regarding Human Rights and corruption.
5. Represent Colombia internationally as ordered by the president.
6. By determination of the president, the vice president will support and advise the president on other issues.
7. Other functions will be addressed according to the needs of the president.

=== Modern roles ===
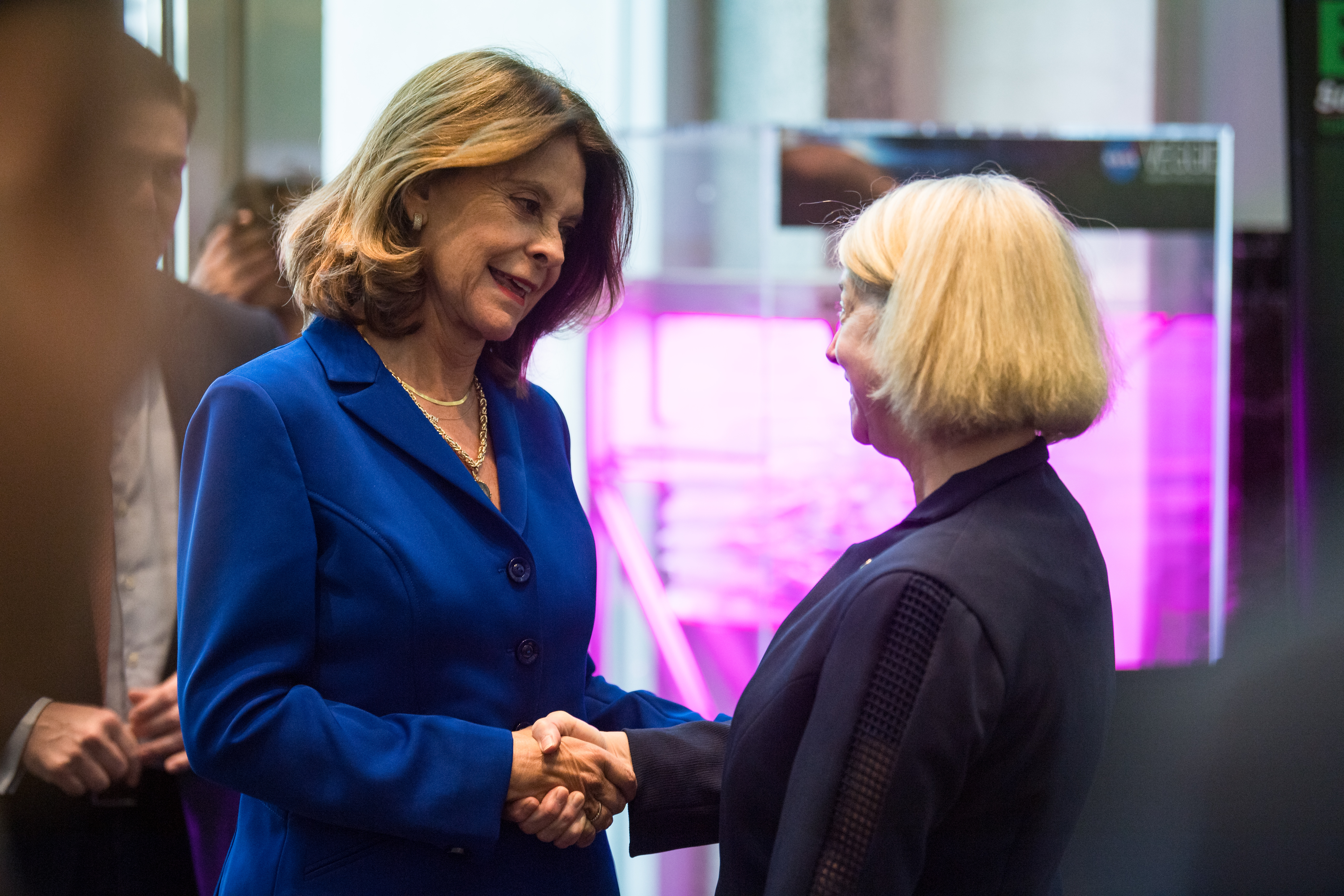
Vice President and Minister of Foreign Affairs Marta Lucía Ramírez with Deputy Administrator of the National Aeronautics and Space Administration Pamela Melroy.

The actual power of the office flows primarily from formal and informal delegations of authority from the president and Congress. These delegations can vary in importance. The scope of the vice president's roles and functions depends on the specific relationship between the president and vice president, but often includes duties as drafter and spokesperson for administration policies, advisor to the president, and symbol of union and advocacy. of the president. The influence of the vice president in these roles depends almost entirely on the characteristics of the particular administration.

The vice president may simultaneously serve as minister while serving as vice president. At the request of the president, the vice president may also serve as head of a particular portfolio until the president so decides. Since 2014, three vice presidents have simultaneously served as heads of portfolios, the most recent being Vice President Marta Lucía Ramírez, who served as Minister of Foreign Affairs.

== Selection process ==
=== Eligibility ===
The vice president must be a natural-born citizen of Colombia, at least 30 years of age. The Constitution of Colombia requires the vice president to meet the same eligibility requirements as the president that can be re-elected. Individuals are eligible to serve an unlimited number of terms as vice president.

- be a natural-born Colombian citizen;
- be a Colombian citizen in exercise;
- be a least 30 years old;

=== Nomination ===
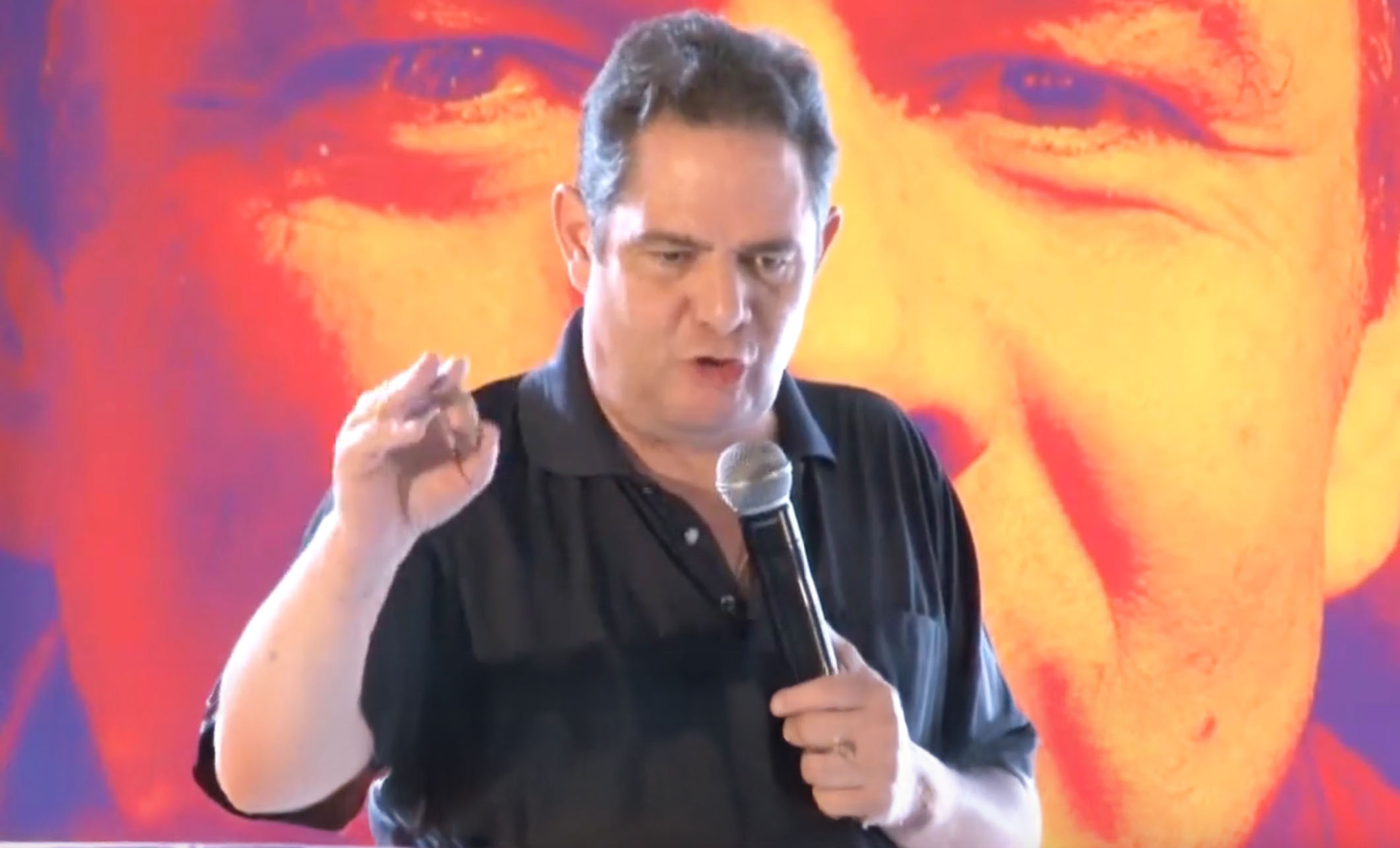
Vice President Germán Vargas Lleras as presidential candidate in 2018.

Currently, in modern practice, the vice presidential candidates of the major national political parties are selected as a result of primary elections. They are usually chosen by the second-highest vote-getter on their respective list of presidential candidates for a party or coalition. In 2014, the National Union coalition, made up of the Liberal, Union for the People, Radical Change, and Citizen Option parties, selected Radical Change leader Germán Vargas Lleras as its vice presidential candidate, resulting in the second-highest vote-getter in the primary election. The most recent presidential candidate to emerge from second-highest vote-getter during a primary election is Francia Márquez. The vice presidential nomination has been criticized for being more of a space for opportunism and electoral ambition, as the electorate usually votes for the vice presidential candidate because they are on the same ballot.

=== Selection criteria ===
Although the vice president is not required to have political experience, most major party vice presidential candidates are current or former senators, and occasionally, they are current or former governors and mayors, as well as former high-ranking military officers (Colombian law prohibits active military personnel from holding political office) or individuals who hold important positions in the executive branch.

Often, the presidential candidate nominates a vice presidential candidate who brings geographic or ideological balance to the ticket or who appeals to a specific constituency. In current practice, the vice presidential candidate is the result of a union between the candidate with the most votes and the second-place finisher during the primary election. This often fosters party or coalition unity. While this selection process can increase the chances of success of a national ticket, it is occasionally criticized because it often results in vice presidents being excluded from the policymaking process of the new administration. Often, their relationships with the president and his team can be distant, nonexistent, or even conflictive.

=== Election ===
The vice president is indirectly elected by voters for a concurrent four-year term. The candidate who receives the absolute majority of the votes for vice president is declared the winner. If no candidate obtains a majority, a new election must be held with new candidates. The votes for the president are also the same as those for the vice president, as both appear on the same ballot and not on separate ballots.

== Tenure ==
=== Inauguration ===
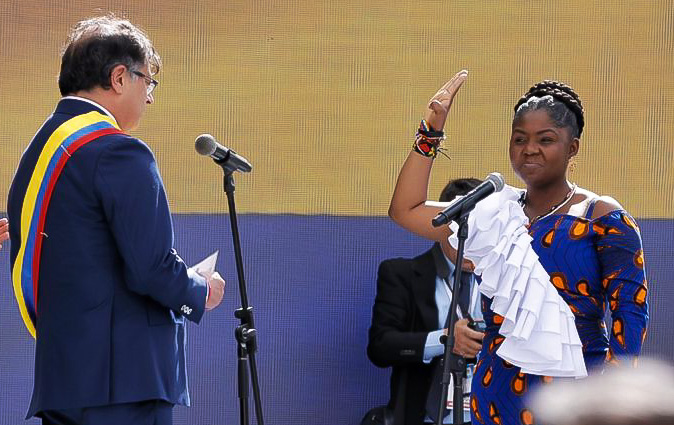
The incoming president Gustavo Petro administering oath to the incoming vice president Francia Márquez.

The vice presidential swearing-in ceremony is held on the inaugural platform of the National Capitol immediately after the president's. Although the Constitution does not specify who administers the vice presidential oath, since 1992, the president has administered the oath to the vice president. The format for the vice presidential oath reads:

I swear to God and promise to the people to faithfully comply with the constitution and laws of Colombia.

=== Term of office ===
The term of office of both the vice president and the president is four years. While the 1991 Colombian Constitution establishes in its eligibility provisions that the vice president must have the same qualifications to be president, it does not specifically prohibit a former president from serving. This opens the door to the possibility of a former president serving as president. In 2025, during the preselection of candidates for the primary election, the Democratic Center and some of its allies raised the possibility that President Álvaro Uribe would be listed as the vice presidential candidate in the 2026 election, an idea that Uribe later dismissed.

=== Vacancies ===
The reinstatement of the office of vice president to the Colombian political map in the 1991 Constitution established the parameters for the vice presidential term. Article 202 establishes that in the event of a vacancy in the vice presidential office, Congress shall meet by its own right, or at the call of the president, to elect a replacement for the remainder of the term. This process has been implemented twice: the first occurred in 1996, following the resignation of Humberto de la Calle on September 19, when Carlos Lemos Simmonds was elected by Congress. The second occurred twenty-one years later, on March 29, 2017, following the resignation of Germán Vargas Lleras, when Congress elected Óscar Naranjo.

== Office and status ==
=== Salary ===
The Vice President's salary in 2021 was $6,994.82. However, due to the salary increase approved by Congress in 2022, it rose to $8,791,534,610 following Decree 0610 of 2025. The Vice President does not automatically receive a pension for their position, but rather the same pension received by other high-level members of the government.

=== Residence ===
The Vice President's residence was designated in 1999, when Andrés Pastrana established the Vice Presidential House, a former military fort owned by the National Mortgage Bank, as the official residence of the Vice President of Colombia. In 1993, the Gaviria administration had purchased the military fort with the intention of restoring and converting it into a residence. Previously, the Vice President's official vacation residence was the Hato Grande estate located in Sopó, Cundinamarca. Until this was designated as the official residence, Vice Presidents lived in houses, apartments, or hotels, and received a salary similar to that of cabinet and congressional members, with only a housing allowance.

=== Travel and transportation ===
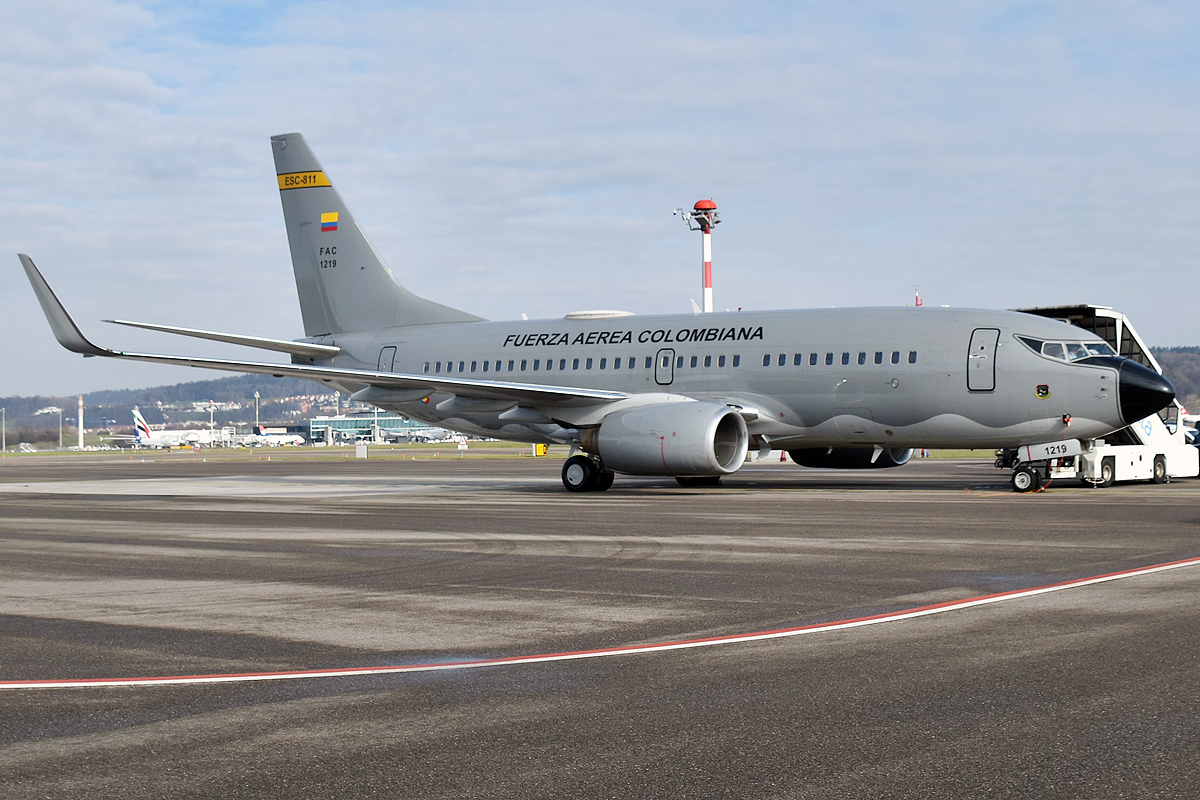
Colombian Air Force Two, the official vice presidential aircraft, carrying the vice president

The Vice President's primary long-haul aircraft is a Boeing 737-732, coded as FAC1219, known as ESC-811 and designated Colombian Air Force Two while the Vice President is on board. Any Colombian Air Force aircraft transporting the Vice President will be designated Air Force Two during the flight. Domestic flights are typically operated by an Aerospace Force or Army aircraft, or, failing that, by the Vice President's veteran Fokker F-28, coded as FAC0002. For short-haul flights, the Vice President has access to a fleet of Colombian Aerospace Force or Army helicopters. These flights are usually operated with two helicopters flying together, frequently swapping positions to conceal the Vice President's location from potential threats.

== See also ==
- List of vice presidents of Colombia
- Colombian presidential line of succession
