= Vice Presidential House =

Official residence of the vice president of Colombia

- Casa Vicepresidencial
- Interactive map of the Vice Presidential House area

General information
- Architectural style: Modernist
- Location: Bogotá, D.C., Carrera 8 A number 7-75, Bogotá, D.C., Colombia
- Coordinates: 4.595°N 74.078°W
- Current tenants: José Manuel Restrepo, Vice President of Colombia
- Construction started: 1999
- Owner: Government of Colombia

Design and construction
- Architect: Rogelio Salmona

The Vice Presidential House it is the official residence of the vice president of Colombia. Located in the La Candelaria area of Bogotá, D.C., it is sometimes informally known as the Casa de la Vicepresidencia. The house was built in 1999 to provide the Vice President with an official residence. Vice President Gustavo Bell was the first to live there, after Congress determined that it would be easier and cheaper to provide security at a government residence and authorized its construction in 1999, making it the first official residence of the Vice President.

Although the official residence of the Vice President, the Vice Presidential House, was made available to him in 1999, all vice presidents have resided there. In 2023, Vice President Francia Márquez used it primarily for official receptions, as she had a secure residence in Dapa, Cauca Valley.

== Early history ==
The Vice Presidential Residence of Colombia was conceived during the 1990s as part of efforts to provide the Vice Presidency with a permanent residential and ceremonial headquarters. Located in the La Candelaria neighborhood of Bogotá, a few meters from the Casa de Nariño, the residence was designed by Colombian architect Rogelio Salmona, renowned for his distinctive use of brick, interior courtyards, and the integration of architecture and landscape. Prior to this acquisition, the Vice President unofficially resided at the Hato Grande Presidential Estate.

The project was developed on a site with historical significance in the city center. During its construction, remnants of old colonial and republican buildings were preserved and incorporated, including structures associated with historical military installations, integrating them into the contemporary design of the residence. The Vice Presidential Residence was inaugurated in 1999 during the administration of President Andrés Pastrana. Its first occupant was Vice President Gustavo Bell, who became the first vice president to have an official residence specifically designed for the office.

Since then, the residence has served both as the official home of the vice presidents of Colombia and as a venue for diplomatic meetings, formal receptions, and institutional events. Its strategic location within the government complex in Bogotá's historic center has made it one of the Colombian state's principal official residences.

== Distribution ==
The interiors of the Vice Presidential Residence reflect Rogelio Salmona's characteristic architectural principles, with wide corridors, interior courtyards, and spaces visually connected to the gardens. Exposed brick dominates the walls, vaults, and floors, creating a sense of continuity between the interior and exterior. Large wood and glass windows allow natural light to flood in and offer unobstructed views of the courtyards and reflecting pools.

The interior design maintains a restrained and functional aesthetic, where the architecture itself is the primary decorative element. The spaces prioritize natural materials, open perspectives, and integration with the landscape.

=== Gardens and surroundings ===
The gardens and outdoor spaces are an integral part of the residence's design. The complex is organized around courtyards and landscaped terraces that incorporate ornamental vegetation, trees, and species adapted to Bogotá's climate. One of the most distinctive elements is the system of canals and stepped reflecting pools that traverse part of the complex, creating visual and auditory journeys inspired by Hispano-Arabic and pre-Hispanic references found in other works by Salmona.

The residence is located in the historic center of Bogotá, in the La Candelaria neighborhood, and enjoys views of the Eastern Hills. Despite its location within one of the city's most densely populated areas, the layout of the patios, gardens, and corridors creates an atmosphere of privacy and tranquility that sets it apart from the surrounding buildings.

== See also ==
- Casa de Nariño – the official residence of the president of Colombia
- Hato Grande – country retreat for the president of Colombia
- House of Distinguished Guest – the official state guest house for the president of Colombia
- Number One Observatory Circle
