= Colombia–European Union relations =

- European Union: Colombia

Colombia–European Union relations are the diplomatic and commercial relations between the Republic of Colombia and the European Union. Colombia has a free trade and free movement agreement with the EU. Colombia has an embassy in Brussels, which is responsible for managing relations with the European Union, while the latter has a representation through the Delegation of the European Union in Colombia in Bogotá.

== History ==
Colombia's relationship with Europe began during the time of the Conquest, which led to the creation of the Viceroyalty of New Granada. After Colombia's independence, the country maintained very strong ties with Europe. Colombia and the European Union share an extensive and diverse bilateral agenda in which the most influential issues are energy, competitiveness, mining, education, innovation, science and technology, biodiversity, climate change, infrastructure, and expansion of trade and investment. There are mechanisms for dialogue in political matters; human rights; security and defence, which are what allow bilateral relations between Colombia and the EU to be constantly strengthened with several high-level meetings. This network of relations is complemented by the dialogue that exists in matters of cooperation (bilateral and regional) and the mechanism of the Committee of the Trade Agreement between Colombia and the European Union.

== Diplomatic representation ==
The Embassy of Colombia to the Kingdom of Belgium is also concurrent to the Grand Duchy of Luxembourg and a mission to the European Union and the North Atlantic Treaty Organization (NATO). ‘’’Representative:’’’ Ambassador Felipe García Echeverri. The European Union is also represented in Colombia through the Delegation of the European Union in Colombia.

Colombia and the European Union share an extensive and diverse bilateral agenda in which the most influential topics are energy, competitiveness, mining, education, innovation, science and technology, biodiversity, climate change, infrastructure, and the expansion of trade and investment. There are mechanisms for dialogue on political matters, human rights, security and defence, which allow bilateral relations between Colombia and the EU to be constantly strengthened with several high-level meetings. This network of relations is complemented by the dialogue that exists in matters of cooperation (bilateral and regional) and the mechanism of the Committee of the Trade Agreement between Colombia and the European Union.

The relationship with the European Union is governed by the Treaty of Lisbon, which was adopted in 2009. The European Union also demonstrated great commitment to the peace agreement with the FARC.

== Migration ==
Colombia has been known internationally for its migration phenomenon, and the States of the European Union have been one of the main recipients of this migration. In Spain, it was estimated that in 2016, 394,038 Colombians resided and in France there were 60,000 to 70,000 Colombians residing in 2007, most of them irregularly.

With the agreement between the European Union and Colombia, Colombians are allowed to travel to Europe for a period of no more than 90 days, and for tourism purposes, without a visa. This has caused Colombian tourism in European territory to skyrocket.

== Economic relations ==
The trade relationship is framed within the Trade Agreement between Colombia and Peru, on the one hand, and the European Union and its Member States, on the other hand. The Trade Agreement between Colombia and Peru, on the one hand, and the European Union and its Member States, on the other hand, was signed in Brussels, Belgium, on 26 June 2012.

On the part of the European Union, the European Parliament approved the agreement on 11 December 2012 and subsequently notified the completion of its internal procedures for the provisional application of the agreement on 27 February 2013.

On the Colombian side, the internal process for its approval in the Congress of the Republic began in November 2012 and lasted until June 5, 2013, ending with the sanction of President Juan Manuel Santos, through Law 1669 of 16 July 2013. For its part, through judgment C-335/14 of 2014, the Constitutional Court declared the agreement constitutional, indicating that it complies with the Political Constitution, both in its formal aspect and in its material content.

The president of the republic, through Decree 1513 of 18 July 2013, provisionally applied the Trade Agreement and notified the European Union of the fulfillment of the internal procedures required for this purpose. Additionally, through the same Decree, the decision was made to provisionally apply the agreement as of 1 August 2013.

On 31 July 2013, through Decree 1636, the market access commitments acquired by Colombia under the Trade Agreement were implemented.

On 5 November 2014, the national government issued Decree 2247, which states that our country will continue to apply without interruption, under the terms set forth in Decree 1513 of 2013, the Trade Agreement signed with the European Union and its member states, after having complied with all internal requirements provided for in our law for its approval. For Colombia and Peru, the agreement entered into force in 2013; and for Ecuador in 2017.

== TLC EU and Colombia ==
=== Antecedents ===
==== Association agreement CAN-EU ====
By 2002, Colombia only had deep trade agreements with the countries of Canada, Mexico and Venezuela within the framework of the G3. However, between 2004 and 2006 there was a development in Colombia's internationalisation policy, resulting in the negotiation of a CAN-MERCOSUR agreement, a FTA with Chile, another with the Northern Triangle of Central America (Guatemala, Honduras and El Salvador), the FTA with the United States and the expansion of the partial scope agreement with Cuba. Then, between 2007 and 2008, negotiations began for a FTA with Canada, with the countries of the European Free Trade Association (Norway, Iceland, Switzerland and Liechtenstein) and with the European Union as a bloc with Colombia. In addition, the government hopes to deepen the agreement it has with Mexico and strengthen its relationship with Peru within the framework of Colombia. This gives rise to a common challenge between Colombia and the EU to negotiate and sign an ‘’’Association Agreement’’’, which will allow them to strengthen their political dialogue, intensify their cooperation and enhance their reciprocal trade. The main pillars of this agreement were: political dialogue, cooperation and trade. This agreement would be negotiated block by block and would take into account the recognition of existing asymmetries, where there would be special and differentiated treatment for Ecuador and Bolivia.

Pillar of political dialogue: As a general objective, this was intended to strengthen political dialogue on the different issues of interest to the parties, in order to strengthen Andean integration and the relations between both integration processes through the established mechanisms. This political dialogue was institutionalised in 1996 with the signing in Rome of a Joint Declaration on the subject and, in order to give greater impetus to this dialogue, in 2003 the Agreement on Political Dialogue and Cooperation was signed.

Pillar of cooperation: This sought to intensify cooperation in areas of mutual interest, with mechanisms and strategies that would contribute to overcoming the existing asymmetries in its three dimensions (B-B, Interior CAN] and country dimension). This Andean-European cooperation would evolve over time, strengthening in the 1970s in the commercial field, in the 1980s special emphasis was placed on cooperation for development and, in the 1990s; it was directed towards building a group of mechanisms for industrial, scientific-technological and inter-company cooperation.

Trade Pillar This sought to achieve real and effective access to consolidate, deepen and diversify various trade flows of Andean goods and services. Likewise, FDI flows between the two regions on the basis of unequal liberalisations in a bi-regional FTA, and reflecting the existence of asymmetries and Special and Differential Treatment between the Andean Community and the European Union, as well as within the Andean Community, taking into account the interests and properties and specific sensitivities of the CAN.

=== Negotiation of multi-party agreements ===
In 2009, the rounds of negotiations for multi-party agreements began. A total of 9 rounds were held in three different cities, starting on 19 February in Bogotá and ending on 26 February 2010 in Brussels. Colombia directly entered into negotiations on various points during this year, such as:

==== Access to markets ====
Six points of interest for Colombia are being negotiated

Consolidation and expansion of Colombia's export offer: Increase and strengthen the process of commercial integration of Colombia in the global economy, by seeking better access conditions for the Colombian export offer.

Colombia's tariff reduction and elimination program: Achieve tariff reduction periods in Colombia that allow the Colombian production system to adapt to the new competitive conditions.

EU Tariff Reduction and Elimination Program: Achieve the immediate reduction of tariffs on Colombia's current and potential exportable supply.

Competitiveness: Prevent the creation of unequal conditions of competition that affect local production and optimise costs in the acquisition of inputs, machinery and equipment.

SGP plus: Preserve and improve the access conditions of both general and "Plus" SGP.

Non-tariff restrictions: Achieve effective access to the European Union market by eliminating unjustified non-tariff restrictions affecting bilateral trade in goods.

==== Agriculture ====
Eight points of interest for Colombia are being negotiated.

Market access Liberalisation of the current and potential exportable agricultural offer of Colombia: Achieve tariff-free access for the current and potential exportable agricultural offer of Colombia, including those products that benefit from the Special Customs Regimes. Tariff concessions will not take into account subheadings that have a zero MFN tariff in the European Union. Consolidate the GSP plus preferences for products of interest to Colombia. Eliminate tariff barriers, quantitative restrictions and other non-tariff barriers to facilitate real access for the Colombian agricultural offer. Agree on asymmetry in the modalities of tariff reduction in favour of Colombia. Seek the elimination of distortions derived from State or mixed companies of the EU.

Market Access - Treatment of sensitive Colombian products: The liberalisation program will provide adequate protection to sensitive Colombian production. Maintain price stabilisation mechanisms. Take into account the "Preference Clause" of the Colombia-U.S. FTA and the MFN provisions of other trade agreements, which will be a reference for the negotiation.

Market Access - Export and Import Restrictions: Eliminate export and import restrictions for bilateral trade.

Market Access Special Agricultural Safeguard: Have an automatic trade defence mechanism to regulate imports of sensitive products that require it in the agricultural sector.

Market Access Special Agricultural Safeguard: Have an automatic trade defence mechanism to regulate imports of sensitive products that require it in the agricultural sector.

Domestic Support - Mechanisms to counteract trade-distorting domestic support: Colombia and the European Union will promote the dismantling of trade-distorting domestic support in the WTO. Seek mechanisms to counteract the distorting effects of the application of domestic support in the European Union. Colombia will have at its disposal the necessary domestic support measures for agriculture.

Export subsidies: Eliminate all forms of export subsidies under the WTO for bilateral trade and prevent any possibility of their reintroduction.

State Trading Enterprises: Eliminate all forms of export subsidies under the WTO framework for bilateral trade and prevent any possibility of their reintroduction.

Agricultural Committee Monitoring the Agreement and Resolution of Disputes: Agree to the creation of an Agricultural Committee to monitor, implement and review the agreement, to make relevant recommendations to the Administrative Commission. It should also guarantee agile and effective procedures for dealing with the issues.

==== Rules of origin ====
Ten points of interest for Colombia are being negotiated

Criteria for qualification of origin: Develop criteria that allow to effectively take advantage of the benefits of the liberation program through the provision of inputs in accordance with the needs of the Colombian productive structure.

Minimal Operations that do not confer Origin: Incorporate the identification of this type of operations in line with the Colombian productive structure.

Origin Qualification: Regional Content Value: Implement, for a small number of tariff items, regional content value measurement mechanisms compatible with the measurement methods currently used in origin certification.

Origin Qualification: Automotive Industry: Adopt origin qualification methods for the automotive sector that are compatible with the different trade negotiations in this sector.

Accumulation: Allowing the accumulation of materials between the partner countries of the agreement, taking into account both the export interest and the protection of the domestic market from third parties. Incorporating a clause that allows the development of extended accumulation with third countries.

De Minimis: Guarantee the origin of all goods in whose production non-originating materials are used, adopting, for the latter, a maximum percentage with respect to the value of the goods compatible with the needs of the country.

Modification of Rules of Origin: Incorporate regulations that allow the modification of rules of origin in the face of changes in production conditions or technological advances, or when rules of origin become obstacles to trade between the Parties.

Request for Origin: Allow certification of origin to be carried out by self-certification or by entities authorized for this purpose, whether in physical or electronic media.

Certification of Origin Format: Adopt minimum criteria on the content of the certification of origin format.

Verification of Origin: Establish verification procedures that include requests for information, completion of questionnaires and visits.

==== Technical barriers to trade ====
Thirteen points of interest for Colombia are being negotiated.

Implement WTO-OTC Agreement: Proper implementation of WTO-OTC and maintain existing rights and obligations under this framework, which must be applied both in central and community government.

Immediate information to the importer for possible detention of goods: Seek full knowledge by the importer of the reasons for a possible detention of goods. In coordination with the customs procedures table, an attempt will be made to leave in this chapter the possibility of signing a collaboration agreement between customs for the review of compliance with technical regulations.

Access and Transparency: Participation of one Party in the development of standards, technical regulations and conformity assessment procedures of the other Party or Parties and coordination for participation in the international standardisation process.

Mechanisms for acceptance or validation of PEC results: Broad recognition of mechanisms to facilitate the acceptance, in the territory of a Party, of the results of conformity assessment procedures carried out in the other Party.

Exchange of information before and after the development of standards, RT or PEC: Transparency in the development of standards, RT and PEC, even those not based on international standards.

Procedure for information exchange: Implement, in accordance with Article 10 of the WTO TBT Agreement, the recommendations indicated in the document Decisions and recommendations adopted by the Committee since 1 January 1995 G/TBT/1/Rev.9, 8 September 2008.

Access to Information: Information centres or points for accessing information on technical regulations, conformity assessment procedures and administrative measures adopted in the countries at the community level, as well as basic studies of the RT.

Comment period: Allow a reasonable and fixed period after notification for people to submit their comments on the proposed RT or PEC, with the possibility of extending said period.

Establish a TBT Committee: Establish a TBT Committee, defining its functions and working on its own operating regulations, in order to facilitate the effective interpretation and application of the TBT agreement, promote the elimination of unnecessary barriers and serve as a means for prompt attention to matters of interest to the Parties.

Facilitate sectoral cooperation: Facilitate sectoral cooperation, as appropriate, between governmental and non-governmental entities, conformity assessment entities and sectoral groups.

Definition of Deadline: To strive for the resolution of queries within a defined period.

Definition of NI: Definition of International Standard, Definitions in accordance with international definitions (ISO/IEC Guide-2, ISO 9000, ISO/IEC 17000, ISO/IEC 17050) Annex 1 of the TBT/WTO Agreement.

==== Sanitary and phytosanitary measures ====
Twenty-six points of interest for Colombia are being negotiated.

General Provisions:

Implement the provisions of the WTO Agreement on the Application of Sanitary and Phytosanitary Measures. Implement the decisions adopted by the WTO Committee on Sanitary and Phytosanitary Measures and the guidelines and recommendations of the relevant international organisations, as well as the decisions of the bilateral committee. Implementation of the definitions in Annex A of the AMPS, the glossary of the relevant organisations and the committee established under the chapter.

Rights and Obligations: Ensure the effective implementation of the SPS/WTO Agreement and the provisions of the Chapter.

Harmonisation:

Have procedures for harmonisation, especially when there are differences in the adoption of standards established or recommended by the three sisters. In the absence of international standards (OIE, IPPC, CODEX) regional standards (CAN) are used and in the absence of the latter, bilateral standards are agreed.

Equivalence:

Celebration of equivalence agreements. Establish a procedure to apply in an agile and accelerated manner, through equivalence agreements between the two parties. Agreed deadline to establish the procedure.

Risk Assessment and Appropriate Level of Protection:

Take into account the procedures of the reference organisations. In the case of updating the SPS measures, maintain the flow of trade, except in the case of a sanitary or phytosanitary emergency situation in the exporting country or the existence of scientific evidence. Ensure that in the absence of the risk analysis by the importing party, the exporting party may send scientific evidence, including mitigation proposals, to support the risk analysis process of the importing party.

Recognition of Free Zones and Zones of Low Prevalence of Pests or Diseases:

Establishment of a streamlined procedure for bilateral recognition of pest- or disease-free zones that are of low prevalence for those pests or diseases that may restrict trade, and for the recovery of sanitary or phytosanitary status, following international standards. Agreeing on deadlines for establishing such procedures within a defined period from the entry into force of the agreement.

Control, Inspection, Approval and Certification Procedures: Establish a mechanism for complaints regarding improper application of Control, Inspection, Approval and Certification procedures.

Agreements between competent authorities for trade facilitation:

Coordinate cooperation and technical assistance programmes between competent authorities on sanitary and phytosanitary matters of mutual interest. Bilateral access (sanitary and phytosanitary protocols).

Transparency:

Ensure early notification system for SPS measures affecting bilateral trade. Bilateral access (sanitary and phytosanitary protocols).

Special and Differential Treatment: Establish a mechanism for complaints regarding improper application of Control, Inspection, Approval and Certification procedures.

‘’’Technical Cooperation:’’’ Build institutional capacity in animal and plant health and food safety.

Technical queries:

Establish technical consultations with the Committee on Sanitary and Phytosanitary Measures of the agreement, through its coordinating competent authority. Complementary mechanism to the committee.

Committee on Sanitary and Phytosanitary Measures:

Establish an SPS Committee to ensure a better understanding of issues related to the implementation of the Chapter. Dispute resolution when no agreement is reached in technical consultations. Committee with dispute resolution functions.

==== Sanitary and phytosanitary measures (?) ====
Seventeen points of interest for Colombia are being negotiated

Safeguard trigger: Agree on rules that allow safeguard measures to be activated to correct imbalances in the production apparatus, resulting from the tax relief program.

Validity of the safeguard measure: Agree on a reasonable period to activate the safeguard mechanism that considers the adjustment period of the productive sector to free trade conditions.

Conditions for applying the safeguard: Agree on rules that allow safeguards to be applied under the standard conditions agreed in Free Trade Agreements.

Scope of application: Agree on rules that allow safeguards to be applied to originating goods regardless of their origin.

Nature of the safeguard measure: Ensure that the safeguard measures applied are of a tariff nature.

Types of Adjustment: Agree that safeguard measures take the form of: Suspending the tariff reduction program; or increasing the tariff to the MFN level.

Provisional Safeguard: Seek rules that allow for the rapid correction of imbalances in the production apparatus and that also reserve access for exports.

Duration of measures: Agree on reasonable periods that allow adjustment to the competitiveness of the productive apparatus.

Extension of safeguard measures: Agree on rules that allow safeguard measures to be extended.

Investigation procedures: Preserve WTO regulations, aimed at the imposition of safeguard measures.

Right of Defence: Establish rules that guarantee the right of defence of exporters involved in investigations.

Compensation: Do not include rules on compensation.

Progressive liberalisation: Agreeing on rules that allow for the progressive release of safeguard measures.

Reestablishment of tariff: Agreeing on rules that determine the tariff that will apply after the end of safeguard measures.

Reapplication: Avoid as far as possible rules that allow safeguards to be reapplied to the same product.

Definitions: Include only necessary definitions relating to the application of safeguards rules, such as footnotes.

Treatment of Products with Preferences: Seek to exclude products included in the Generalised System of Preferences granted by the EU from the adoption of safeguards.

==== Services, establishment and movement of capital ====
Twenty-nine points of interest for Colombia are being negotiated.

Objective, scope and coverage of the chapter: To reaffirm the Parties' commitments under the WTO Agreement and to take into account the Parties' level of development when establishing the necessary arrangements for the progressive liberalisation of the establishment of and trade in services and for cooperation in electronic commerce, with a view to facilitating regional integration and sustainable development of the Parties.

Definition of Legal Person: Specify in the definition of "legal person of the EC Party" or "legal person of Colombia" the scope and coverage thereof.

Establishment Coverage of the chapter: Specify the measures and determine the sectors covered by the disciplines that are agreed upon.

Establishment - Most Favoured Nation Treatment: Receive and extend benefits from agreements that are negotiated in the future.

Establishment - Other Agreements: Confirm the rights and obligations under any bilateral or multilateral agreement related to investment to which one or more States of the European Community, on the one hand, and Colombia, on the other hand, are Parties.

Cross-Border Supply of Services - Chapter coverage: Specify the measures and determine the sectors covered by the disciplines to be agreed.

Cross-Border Supply of Services - Most Favoured Nation Treatment: Receive and extend benefits from agreements negotiated in the future.

Temporary Presence of Natural Persons - Coverage and Definitions: Include within the coverage of the chapter, in addition to "Key Personnel", the category of "Technicians" "Business Visitors" as well as an annex that lists the activities covered by said "Business Visitors"

Provisions of General Application - Domestic Regulation: Ensure that each Party ensures that all measures of general application affecting cross-border trade in services, establishment in services sectors and the temporary presence of natural persons for business purposes are administered in a reasonable, objective and impartial manner.

Computer Services: Confirm the Parties' understanding on the scope of coverage of CPC division 84 Computer and related services.

Postal and Courier Services - Universal Service: Maintain the power of the state to adopt or maintain the universal service policy.

Telecommunications Services Scope: Cover basic and value-added services with the disciplines of the chapter.

Telecommunications Services - Obligations for major suppliers: Establish obligations for major suppliers regarding transparency, non-discrimination obligations in relation to interconnection access to, and use of, specific network services.

Telecommunications Services Interconnection: Ensure that any provider authorised to provide telecommunications services will have the right to negotiate interconnection with other providers of publicly available telecommunications networks and services.

Authorisation to provide telecommunications services: The commitment regarding authorisation and licences to provide telecommunications services and the criteria for approval and denial will be carried out in accordance with the regulations of the Parties.

Telecommunications Services Regulatory independence: Ensure that regulatory authorities for telecommunications services are independent of any telecommunications service provider.

Telecommunications Services Universal Service: Maintain the power of the state to adopt or maintain the universal service policy.

Financial Services Mandatory pensions and severance pay: Maintaining the State's powers to regulate the social security system.

Financial Services Most Favoured Nation: Maintain the possibility of not extending deeper benefits granted within the framework of the Andean Community.

Financial Services Access to the European Union financial market: Facilitate access for the establishment and operation of Colombian financial entities by eliminating restrictions and streamlining procedures.

Financial Services - Cross-border trade in insurance (modes 1 and 4): Protecting consumers from financial services provided by financial institutions not established in the country. Excluding social security-related insurance and insurance taken out by state entities.

Financial Services - Cross-border trade in non-insurance services modes 1 and 4: Protecting consumers from financial services provided by financial institutions not established in the country. Preventing money laundering.

Financial Services Authorisation of new financial services: Maintain the power to authorize new financial services to control the structure of the financial system and its economic effects.

Financial Services Control of capital flows: Maintain discretion to control capital flows in order to preserve macroeconomic stability.

Financial Services - Collective portfolio management (mode 1): Open access to Colombian financial institutions to the management of collective portfolios of European financial intermediaries.

Financial Services Commercial presence: Grant equal rights and obligations to EU financial entities that establish themselves in Colombia in relation to those already established.

International Maritime Transport Services Scope, Definition and Principles: Extend the benefits of this Title only to the shipping companies of the Parties that meet the requirement of establishment in the national territory.

Exceptions: Agree on the framework for generally applicable exceptions and security exceptions that the Parties may take.

Capital Movement Safeguard Measures: Establish the possibility for the Parties to apply temporary safeguard measures with respect to current payments and capital movements, without specifying deadlines.

Protocol on Cultural Cooperation: Establishes the framework within which the Parties will cooperate to facilitate exchanges related to cultural activities, goods and services, including the audiovisual sector.

==== Public procurement ====
Seven points of interest for Colombia are being negotiated.

National Treatment and Non-Discrimination: Guarantee that our suppliers, products and services will be treated like their European counterparts, and that the procedures and conditions of participation do not constitute barriers to access.

Scope of Application: Establish a scope that includes entities and contracts of interest to Colombia by including the largest number of public entities at all levels of government and with the fewest reservations.

Government level coverage: Negotiate access to all levels of government (entities)

Exceptions: Do not include certain types of contracts that are excluded by Law 80/93 and 1 150/07 and may have problems with the TN and ND principles.

Procedures: Include any procedures used for covered contracts, except for cases established for direct contracting. In the case of selective tenders and auctions, establish rules that facilitate the participation of Colombian suppliers.

Transparency: Ensure that Colombian suppliers have access, under the same conditions as a European supplier, to procedural guarantees at all stages of contracting, and to business opportunities.

SMEs: Create cooperation spaces to promote exports from our companies, especially SMEs, through public procurement. On the other hand, maintain the SME reserve for Colombia.

==== Competence ====
Eight points of interest for Colombia are being negotiated.

Competition legislation Maintain competition: legislation that prohibits restrictive practices, as well as the authority that enforces such legislation.

Cooperation and Coordination of Authorities: Establish some level of coordination between authorities for the effective implementation of legislation.

Transparency: Improve access to and exchange of information on competition laws; designated monopoly state enterprises.

Technical assistance: Strengthen the technical and infrastructure capacities of competition promotion authorities.

Designated monopolies and state-owned enterprises: Preserve the autonomy of the State to designate monopolies and maintain and establish state-owned enterprises. Subject monopolies and state-owned enterprises to competition rules.

Dispute resolution: Exclude from the dispute resolution mechanism those provisions that undermine the sovereignty and autonomy of the State.

Consultations: Establish a formal consultation mechanism to facilitate understanding and address specific issues.

==== Institutional affairs ====
Eighteen points of interest for Colombia are being negotiated.

Preamble: Strengthen trade relations and the economic and social development of the Parties, as well as the improvement of the quality of life of the people.

Definitions: Establish clear definitions that do not give rise to multiple interpretations.

Transparency: Establish clear mechanisms for information, publication of rules and procedures related to the agreement.

Transparency: Minimise the administrative and budgetary burden involved in the adoption of transparency provisions.

Administrative Functioning of the Agreement: Having clear statements that allow the efficient functioning of the agreement from its entry into force.

Administration of the Agreement. Administrative Commission: Establish a simplified scheme for the administration of the agreement.

Administration of the Agreement. Administrative Commission: Establish a commission at the Ministerial level that fulfills clearly defined functions and makes agile and timely decisions that achieve the correct functioning of the agreement (political instance)

General Exceptions: Establish exceptions in accordance with the interests of Colombia within the negotiation.

Amendments: Ensure that modifications or amendments to the agreement are made unanimously by the Parties and approved following the internal legal procedures of each one.

Validity and Termination: Establish the mechanism for the entry into force of the agreement between the countries that have approved it and the time for its termination to take effect.

==== Dispute resolution ====
Seven points of interest for Colombia are being negotiated.

Scope of Application: Achieve the activation of the mechanism when disputes arise from the application, interpretation and non-compliance of the agreement and from cancellation and impairment.

Activation of the mechanism: ensuring that the mechanism is easily activated by the interested Party.

Stages of the mechanism: Establish a procedure with specific stages and defined deadlines, which guarantee that the mechanism will not be hindered by inactivity of any of the Parties.

Arbitration procedure: Having a mechanism that allows the Arbitration Court to be established in an agile and efficient manner, in order to have an effective solution to the controversy.

List of arbitrators: To exalt the power of the Parties to choose their arbitrators when a controversy arises.

Binding effect of the Arbitration Award and compliance: Establish that the decision of the arbitration tribunal is binding and mandatory for the Parties.

Sanctions for non-compliance: Establish trade sanctions for non-compliance with the provisions of the agreement, which will have an effect equivalent to the harm caused.

==== Trade and sustainable development ====
Eleven points of interest for Colombia are being negotiated.

Concept of Trade and Sustainable Development: Recognise that the concept of sustainable development is based on three interdependent pillars: economic, socio-laboral and environmental.

Scope of Application: Limit the Parties' commitments to the labour and environmental spheres. Limit the obligations assumed in the chapter to aspects that affect trade between the Parties.

Legislative capacity Labour and environmental: Establish full respect for the legal system of each of the Parties and recognise the right of these to adopt and modify their own labour and environmental standards, in order to respond to their needs, without affecting international commitments acquired in these matters.

Compliance with domestic labour legislation and ILO International Conventions: Continue to make progress in the effective application of domestic labour legislation. The scope of application of labour commitments must refer to the fundamental labour rights included in the ILO Declaration on Fundamental Principles and Rights at Work and its Follow-up (1998), recognised in domestic labour legislation and which have a direct relationship with or affect trade between the Parties.

Compliance with domestic environmental legislation and Multilateral Environmental Agreements AMUMAS: Make commitments regarding compliance with domestic legislation. Preserve autonomy to apply national environmental regulations derived from multilateral environmental agreements.

Public participation: Have transparent processes in accordance with the internal legislation of the Parties and that give legitimacy to the activities established in the chapter.

Biodiversity: Gain recognition of the importance of conservation and sustainable use of biological diversity.

Chapter administration and monitoring bodies: Establish an institutional structure, clearly defining its functions, in order to monitor compliance with the obligations of the chapter, prioritising consensus solutions between the parties, without this entailing the creation or intervention of external or supranational organisations.

Dispute Resolution: Define a mechanism to resolve disputes arising under this Chapter, different from the agreement's dispute resolution mechanism. Non-compliance and sanctions: Ensure that non-compliance with the obligations of the Chapter does not generate trade or monetary sanctions for the Parties.

Labour and environmental cooperation and capacity building: Obtain cooperation on labor and environmental issues that take into account the realities of Colombia and its particular needs, to improve compliance and effectively implement the obligations agreed in the chapter.

==== Strengthening trade capabilities ====
Two points of interest for Colombia are being negotiated.

Technical assistance: Ensure that the European Union's cooperation programmes are appropriately oriented towards technical assistance for the development and strengthening of productive and commercial capacities.

Leveraging the Agreement: Direct the financial resources allocated to the commercial area toward those activities that require greater support and have the greatest impact on the implementation and utilisation of the agreement.

==== Customs and trade facilitation ====
Eleven points of interest for Colombia are being negotiated.

Customs Procedures: Base legislation on the main elements of the Revised Kyoto Convention, WCO Framework and the Harmonised System.

Customs Procedures: Have legislation that avoids discriminatory and unnecessary charges.

Customs Procedures: Use of a single, administrative or equivalent electronic document.

Customs Procedures: Use of objective risk management systems.

Customs Procedures: Advance Resolutions on Tariff Classification and Origin.

Customs Procedures: Development of systems for the electronic exchange of information between customs administrations and other agencies.

Customs Procedures: Proportionality in the application of sanctions.

Customs Procedures: Establishment of transparent, proportional and non-discriminatory rules for the authorisation of customs agents.

Customs Procedures: Elimination of mandatory use of pre-shipment inspections instead of exit or entry.

Customs Procedures: Right to appeal against actions, rules and administrative decisions of the customs authority.

Customs Procedures: Ensure high standards of integrity of customs officials.

Transit of Goods: Ensure freedom of transit according to the most convenient route.

Transit of Goods: Uniform application, non-discrimination and national treatment in transit.

Transit of Goods: Transit regime without payment of customs taxes or charges provided there is an appropriate guarantee.

Transit of Goods: Coordination and cooperation between authorities and other entities involved at the border.

Relationship with the business community: Availability of legislation, procedures, tariffs and charges by electronic means and existence of a reasonable period of time for modifications before they come into force.

Relationship with the trading community: Consultation mechanisms between customs and the trading community.

Relationship with the business community: Availability of administrative notices, hours of operation and procedures at ports and border crossings.

Customs Valuation: Application of Art. VII GATT and Valuation Agreement.

Special Committee on Customs Cooperation, Trade Facilitation and Rules of Origin: The Committee shall be responsible for the correct interpretation of the chapter, inclusion of best practices and international standards in customs matters.

Customs Mutual Assistance Agreement: Establish a direct mechanism for cooperation and mutual assistance between the customs of the Parties to prevent, detect and combat illegal activities related to foreign trade.

==== Intellectual property ====
Five points of interest for Colombia are being negotiated.

General Provisions: Incorporate general provisions that serve as a criterion for interpreting the chapter that includes the reference to Doha.

Biopiracy: Ensure complementarity between TRIPS and CBD Implement mechanisms that restrict the misappropriation of biodiversity and traditional knowledge.

Technology Transfer: Encourage and facilitate technology transfer.

Compliance: Maintain the TRIPS standard.

Relationship between GIs and Trademarks: Maintaining the level of protection of Geographical Indications against trademarks, to exploit the potential that the country has in this area.

=== Negotiation results ===
==== I. Main achievements ====
After a negotiation process that lasted more than two and a half years and nine rounds of negotiations under a multi-party format, the country has achieved one of the fundamental objectives of its internationalisation process, by securing preferential and permanent conditions with a key player in the world economy and for Colombia, such as the European Union. There are many reasons why a Trade Agreement with the European Union is clearly convenient for the country. The importance for Colombia of an agreement with the EU, among other reasons, lies in achieving a preferential and permanent relationship, which is also our second trading partner: On the bilateral level, in the trade of goods, the EU is Colombia's second trading partner after the United States, since trade in both directions has been growing in recent years, reaching US$4.7 billion in exports (14% of total exports) and US$5.1 billion in imports (15% of total imports). And it is a major investor in our country: The accumulated investment (not including the oil sector) from the EU in Colombia from January 2002 to September 2009 amounts to US$6.35 billion, which places the EU as the second largest investor in our country with 23% of the total.

In conclusion: The agreement defines clear and predictable rules of the game in terms of trade in goods and services and investment flows. This will allow for greater economic growth and the creation of stable and well-paid jobs by taking advantage of one of the largest and most dynamic markets in the world, in which our competitors have or will soon have preferential access.

==== Main results ====
Market Access (General Rules and Non-Agricultural Goods): The disciplines that will govern trade in goods were agreed upon; in particular, the conditions for the gradual elimination of tariffs and non-tariff measures. Consensuses were reached on fundamental issues for Colombia, such as the possibility of continuing to use tariff exemption mechanisms (the Vallejo Plan and the tariff component of the Free Trade Zones) to produce goods that take advantage of the agreed preferences and the maintenance of measures and controls on imports of used, remanufactured and recovered goods and the contribution to the exports of coffee and emeralds.

Agriculture: In addition to the general provisions of the Market Access chapter that also apply to trade in agricultural goods, there are specific disciplines for agricultural trade, such as those related to safeguards for certain agricultural products, the elimination of export subsidies, and the administration of quotas.

Rules of Origin: This chapter defines the minimum transformation conditions required to ensure that the benefit of the agreed-upon liberalisation programs is received by the goods produced in the territory of the Parties. In this regard, the general criteria and procedures that must be met to determine the origin of a good were agreed upon. Additionally, the appropriate specific origin requirements that apply to the products were agreed upon, in accordance with the productive conditions and the availability of raw materials and inputs of the Parties. A. Technical Barriers to Trade: Addresses disciplines to facilitate effective access to the Parties' markets, avoiding the creation and promoting the elimination of unnecessary technical barriers to trade. The competent institutions are empowered to review compliance with technical regulations, and transparency and disclosure of standards, regulations and procedures are promoted, as well as the reasons for the authorities' detention of goods.

Sanitary and Phytosanitary Measures: This chapter covers commitments to ensure that trade in agricultural and agro-industrial goods is facilitated and thus allow effective access for our products to the European market. A committee is created under which the mechanisms and procedures for resolving health problems that may arise between the Parties will be applied. The chapter also promotes collaboration between the competent authorities and generates the dynamics for the mutual recognition of equivalence agreements, recognition of regionalisation, risk assessment and for control, inspection and approval procedures.

Customs and Trade Facilitation: Establishes efficient customs procedures that will strengthen and modernise customs operations in Colombia; there will be an agreement for the prevention and fight against fraud through cooperation and the timely exchange of information between customs administrations.

Trade Defence: Defines rules that allow safeguarding the interests of producers when there is an unusual increase in imports that cause substantial damage; it also protects the interests of exporters in the market by having balanced rules that prevent abuse of the instrument. There are also provisions on global safeguards and antidumping measures.

Competition: The chapter recognises the importance of free competition in markets and the need to avoid the effects of anti-competitive behaviour on trade and investment, which is reinforced by commitments on cooperation between authorities, with the aim of generating mechanisms to effectively pursue and sanction anti-competitive practices.

Public Procurement: Provisions were agreed upon that allow Colombian and European companies to have transparent and non-discriminatory procedures in the contracting processes of public entities at all levels of government.

Strengthening Trade Capabilities: This will allow for the identification of cooperation projects aimed at generating opportunities for trade and investment, particularly promoting the use of the agreement by SMEs, and addressing needs in health measures and technical regulations, among others, to strengthen the country's capacities in implementing the agreement.

Trade and Sustainable Development: Reflects the agreements reached regarding the complementarity of trade, environmental and labour policies to contribute to sustainable development; the commitment not to weaken legislation in this area to encourage trade and investment; a mechanism to monitor commitments and spaces for civil society participation. In relation to migrant workers, the Parties recognise the importance of promoting equal treatment in terms of working conditions, with the aim of eliminating any discrimination in this regard against any worker, including migrant workers who are legally employed in their territories.

Establishment and Services: Stable and certain conditions have been achieved for European investors located in our country. In Services, national suppliers will be able to develop their activities in 21 sectors, giving priority to those integrated within the Productive Transformation programme promoted by the Ministry of Commerce, Industry and Tourism, in a framework that allows the provision of services, either remotely or, when required, temporarily moving to the country that requires it to carry out their work there. In this last aspect, the possibility that service providers contracted by a Colombian company to provide a service in the EU will now have to enter and remain in European territory for a period of 6 months stands out.

In Cross-Border Services, disciplines were agreed upon that correspond to the liberalisation principles that the parties are obliged to comply with once the agreement has been signed, for those service sectors that each country decides to liberalise, stating the entry conditions and limitations that will apply in accordance with the principles of national treatment and most-favoured nation. This will generate commercial opportunities for all those individuals and/or companies that can sell their services from Colombia without having to move or settle in one of the EU countries. Additionally, it will increase the export potential of Professional Services, since the possibility of the Parties negotiating mutual recognition agreements is established.

In the Temporary Entry of Natural Persons for Business Purposes, commitments were established to create the necessary conditions to facilitate the entry and temporary stay of key personnel, graduate interns, sellers of commercial services, contractual service providers and independent professionals and persons on short business visits; in accordance with the preferential trade relationship between Colombia and the EU.

In Telecommunications, these include, among others, the authorization to provide basic and value-added telecommunications services, the corresponding obligations of regulatory authorities, additional obligations of Important Suppliers, commitments to guarantee interconnection, confidentiality of information and the resolution of disputes between suppliers.

In Financial Services, commitments are made for a gradual opening of the sector. It is expected that this will contribute to the consolidation and globalisation of the Colombian financial sector and to the achievement of greater efficiency as a result of the introduction of new technologies, products and management techniques, derived from the entry of foreign financial institutions through the figure of branches with assigned capital.

In the International Maritime Transport Services section, the principles that will allow the liberalisation of services in this important subsector were established. In accordance with these commitments, Colombian-flagged vessels will receive treatment no less favourable than that granted by the EU to its own vessels in relation to, among others, access to ports, use of infrastructure and auxiliary maritime services in ports, as well as in relation to tariffs and costs, customs facilities and the allocation of berths and loading and unloading facilities.

In Electronic Commerce, disciplines are established to promote the development of electronic commerce between Colombia and the EU, in particular through cooperation. It is therefore hoped to promote the development of remote outsourced services sectors (BPO), move towards paperless trade administration and promote the international recognition of Colombia as a “safe haven” in terms of personal data protection.

Intellectual property: Contains provisions aimed at the adequate and effective protection of intellectual property rights, maintaining a balance between the rights of the owners and the interests of the general public, particularly in matters of education, research, public health and access to information. Commitments were also made regarding the protection of biodiversity, technology transfer and cooperation, achieving an appropriate balance between the protection provided in terms of geographical indications and that which will be assigned to products derived from biodiversity.

Institutional Affairs and Dispute Resolution: Defines the legal structure of the agreement, as well as its administrative bodies, transparency commitments and general exceptions that apply across the board to the entire Agreement. Additionally, there is a dispute resolution mechanism to quickly and promptly resolve any disputes that arise during the application of the agreement.

=== Content of the agreement ===
On the one hand, the trade agreement between Colombia and Peru and the European Union includes elements of political dialogue and cooperation not limited to trade, such as respect for human rights and sustainable development. Regarding trade, the agreement creates a stable legal basis for trade relations between the two parties, creates new job opportunities, creates a favourable investment framework, complies with environmental and human rights standards and agreements. It also offers incentives for goods and services produced domestically, one of the most important economies in the world, with more than 500 million consumers from 27 countries and, according to the World Trade Organization, the world is a major importer and exporter of goods worldwide, as well as being number one in the world in the purchase and sale of services. In terms of political dialogue, the agreement continues the dialogue process that Colombia is carrying out with the European Union and several member states, in which human rights are an important element, reflected in the agreement. Cooperation programs in the agreement include human rights, labour rights, sustainable development and environmental protection, climate change, development of small and medium-sized enterprises, development of the dairy industry, and support for the fishing industry and other industries. The European Commission predicts that Colombia will become the country with the greatest increase in industrial production as a result of the trade agreement, especially in the automotive and auto parts sectors (25.5%), chemical, plastics and rubber products (8.2%) and textile (7.2%) Create jobs and grow locally to sustain the economy Provides Colombian producers access to a consumer market larger than that of the United States and Japan combined Provides immediate, duty-free access to European Union markets for 99.9% of Colombia's manufacturing, industrial and fishing sectors Provides immediate, duty-free access to European Union markets for agricultural products including sugar, flour, coffee, bananas and other fruits, as well as beef, while protecting some sensitive products such as pork, poultry, corn and rice. Reduce barriers and encourage European countries to invest in Colombia's key services and manufacturing sectors. Build relationships with international organisations that can support Colombia's progress on human rights and trade unions at national and international levels.

The questionnaire consolidates participation in Colombia, sustainable development, provides architectural guarantee of the agreement on the implementation of high environmental standards and works.

° Ensure that Colombian companies have access to European public procurement without discrimination.

° Provide technical support and capacity building initiatives to enhance competitiveness and innovation capacity.

° Emphasise Colombia's leadership in Latin America and strengthen Colombia's relationship with the world's leading political force.

=== Implementation of the agreement ===
The "Trade Agreement between Colombia and Peru and the European Union and its Member States", signed in Brussels, Belgium, on 26 June 2012, complied with the procedure provided for in articles 150, 189 and 241 of the Political Constitution for the application of treaties, namely, it was approved by the Congress of the Republic through Law 1669 of 2013. Its first decree was Decree 1513 of 18 July 2013, then Decree 1636 of 31 July 2013, until reaching Decree 2247 of 5 November 2014. The latter was declared constitutional by the Constitutional Court in judgment C-335 of 2014 and notified of compliance with internal requirements for the application of the treaty to the European Union by the Republic of Colombia; and with the understanding that the unconstitutionality of Decree 1513 of 2013 will begin to take effect as of 8 November 2014.

DECREES

ARTICLE 1. To develop the market access commitments acquired by Colombia under the "Trade Agreement between Colombia and Peru, on the one hand, and the European Union and its Member States, on the other hand", signed in Brussels, Belgium, on 26 June 2012", hereinafter "the Agreement", approved by Law 1669 of 2013, in the aspects regulated by the following provisions. PARAGRAPH. Taking into account that the National Government ordered that the Agreement take effect as of 1 August 2013, for all purposes of this Decree it shall be understood that the application of the Agreement continues by virtue of paragraph 3 of article 330 thereof, except as provided in its articles 2, 202 paragraph 1, 291 and 292, without interruption from that date.

ARTICLE 2. The elimination, hereinafter also called tariff reduction, provided for in the Agreement shall continue to apply without interruption, taking into account that said application began on 1 August 2013.

ARTICLE 3. Imports of goods originating in the European Union and its Member States shall pay the customs duties resulting from applying the rules established in this Decree.

ARTICLE 4. Year zero of the tariff elimination schedule shall be the period of time between the date on which the agreement became effective (also referred to as "Start of Implementation"), i.e., 1 August 2013, and 31 December 2013. Year one of the tariff elimination schedule shall be the calendar year beginning on 1 January 2014, and ending on 31 December 2014. Years referred to as "year two," "year three," and so on, mean calendar years following year one. Tariff cuts shall be defined for each staging category.

ARTICLE 5. Base rate of customs tariff means the rate or tariff indicated for each tariff subheading in the Tariff Reduction Lists provided for in Articles 12 and 33.

ARTICLE 6. This decree confirms the establishment of a free trade area between Colombia and the European Union and its member States, in accordance with the provisions of Article XXIV of the General Agreement on Tariffs and Trade of 1994 and Article V of the General Agreement on Trade in Services.

ARTICLE 7. This decree confirms the rights and obligations existing between Colombia and the European Union and its member States, in accordance with the WTO Agreement and other agreements to which they are party.

Additionally, the decree is divided into different articles:

CHAPTER ONE: SCHEDULE FOR THE ELIMINATION OR REDUCTION OF TARIFFS ON NON-AGRICULTURAL GOODS

SECTION A - TAX DEDUCTION CATEGORIES: Articles 8 to 11

SECTION B - TAX REDUCTION LIST: Article 12.

CHAPTER TWO: CUSTOMS TARIFFS REDUCTION PROGRAM FOR AGRICULTURAL GOODS

SECTION A - TAX DEDUCTION CATEGORIES: Articles 13 to 32.

SECTION B - TAX REDUCTION LIST: Article 33.

SECTION C - TARIFF QUOTAS: Articles 34 to 49.

SECTION D - AGRICULTURAL SAFEGUARD: Articles 50 to 52.

CHAPTER THREE: BILATERAL SAFEGUARD MEASURES

Articles 53 to 58

CHAPTER FOUR:

SECTION A - RULES AND PROCEDURES OF ORIGIN: Article 59.

SECTION B - PROOF OF ORIGIN: Article 60.

SECTION C - ORIGIN VERIFICATION PROCEDURES: Article 61.

CHAPTER FIVE: FINAL PROVISIONS

ARTICLE 62. The tariff quotas established in the Tariff Reduction Program for imports of Agricultural Products originating in the European Union and its Member States, to which this Decree refers, will be regulated and administered by the National Tax and Customs Directorate.

ARTICLE 63. If after the date on which the Agreement took effect, the applied Most Favoured Nation customs tariff is reduced, such customs tariff shall be applied only if it is lower than the customs tariff calculated in accordance with the tariff reduction categories of this Decree.

ARTICLE 64. In the event of any discrepancy between the provisions of this Decree and the Agreement, the latter shall prevail.

ARTICLE 65. This Decree shall enter into force on the date of its publication and shall take effect on 8 November 2014.

== The EU in the peace process ==
The European Union, in its desire to expand its influence by reaching out to countries with economic and social difficulties in Latin America, has declared peace and stability in Colombia a priority for all its member states in recent times.

=== European Peace Facility in Colombia ===
The European Peace Facility in Colombia was created by the European Union through the Decision of 22 March 2016, which was officially established with the constitutive agreement of 12 December 2016, as a sign of solidarity and political support to the Colombian Government in the implementation of the Peace Agreement. This is a trust fund (EUTF) that the European Union has used as a financing vehicle since 2013, for its development cooperation in situations that require large-scale support through flexible, responsive mechanisms that offer concrete results more quickly. They allow contributions from the EU budget and contributions from Member States and other donors to be combined under a single management. The fund's interventions are designed based on the concrete situations and specific needs that arise in the regions and are characterised by promoting a broad and inclusive dialogue in the territory, between communities, local authorities and the private sector, which feed into the strategies adopted. Through specific technical assistance for the fund, the EU transfers knowledge, technically supports the projects and initiatives launched, and promotes better thematic and geographical coordination between them, in order to enhance the results and effects in communities and territories. The fund remains open to all member states and other nations that wish to support European action in favour of sustainable and inclusive peace in Colombia, through additional technical contributions that allow for the strengthening of the actions that are underway, such as, for example, the exchange of experiences of professionals from European public administrations.

This is made up of the European Union itself, together with 21 of its member states, the United Kingdom and Chile, with a total contribution of more than 130 million euros. Its commitment is to respond in an effective and coordinated manner to the needs in terms of peace consolidation and economic and social development of the territories most affected by the armed conflict, channelling the contributions from its donors.

=== Objectives of the European Peace Facility ===
The main objective of this fund is to support the implementation of the peace process between the Government of Colombia and the FARC and to accompany the Colombian population to overcome the effects of 50 years of armed conflict. Its focus of action is based on the experience of the European Union and its Member States. The activities carried out are concentrated on the early recovery and stabilisation of the territories most affected by the conflict, with special emphasis on rural development, supporting programs for public administration reform, decentralisation and citizen participation. At the same time, it seeks to strengthen the participation of civil society, promote gender equality, reinforce resilience in the most vulnerable population groups and accompany the process of reincorporation into civilian life of the signatories of the peace. The projects managed by the fund are guided by 5 strategic pillars: Reconciliation and reduction of conflict. Reintegration of former members of the FARC-EP into social life in the economic and social sphere. Population inclusion of young people, women and ethnic groups. Sustainable and inclusive productivity. Legitimising presence of the Colombian State and local governance. Promotion of added value of the European Union

=== Geographical coverage ===
The fund's different interventions cover a geographical area of 27 departments and 145 municipalities, of which 65 are PDET municipalities (Territorial Development Programs) and 17 correspond to Strategic Zones for Comprehensive Intervention or Future Zones. The fund also deploys its actions in 24 Former Territorial Spaces for Training and Reincorporation (AETCR) and 5 New Reincorporation Areas (NAR).

=== Decision-making and governance of the fund ===
In order to ensure transparency, efficiency and effective coordination in decision-making regarding the allocation of resources and their administration, the fund has a governance structure made up of two bodies: the Strategic Committee and the Operating Committee.

The European Commission, represented by the EU Delegation (DUE) in Colombia, is responsible for the administration of the fund. The Colombian Government (represented by the Presidential Advisor for Stabilisation and Consolidation) has the status of partner in the fund. This allows for dialogue and coordination of actions in relation to the priorities and needs raised by the Government. The Partner's opinions regarding the identification, formulation and execution of actions are heard in the Operating Committee in order to guarantee local appropriation and subsequent sustainability of the actions. In addition, there are Territorial/Sectoral Roundtables as an instance for the articulation and coordination between the projects and initiatives implemented.

==== Strategic committee ====
Its function is to adopt and review the fund's strategy, define its geographic and thematic scope, decide on its strategic guidelines, review annual reports, evaluate the results and effects of the actions financed, and define the way in which non-European countries can contribute to the fund.

It is the body responsible for selecting the actions to be financed by the fund, which must be in line with the fund's priorities, as set out in Annex 1 of the Constitutive Agreement. Its function is to examine and approve the actions to be financed, supervise their implementation, approve the fund's annual reports and ensure adequate visibility of the actions. It is composed of: (i) the fund manager, who acts on behalf of the European Union, (ii) representatives of the founding donors who have contributed a minimum amount of EUR 3 million; and (iii) a representative of another donor or group of donors who have made contributions of less than EUR 3 million or who have signed the agreement and have contribution commitments. A representative of the partner and representatives of Non-Member States, and representatives of other organisations as observers are also invited.

==== European Commission ====
It is the body responsible for the administration of the fund, the secretariat of the Strategic Committee and the Operating Committee, the financial administration and the execution of actions, among others. To carry out its functions, the commission has an Administrative Delegate, an Accounting Delegate and a team of Cooperation Officers who work in the Delegation of the European Union in Colombia.

==== Territorial and sectoral tables ====
It is established as an instrument for articulation, coordination and governance between the fund's projects, whose objective is to generate a space for meeting with partners and institutions and to reach certain agreements in operational and strategic terms. These spaces, which include the participation of Cooperation Officers from the Delegation of the European Union, allow for the exchange of key information on territorial contexts and local dynamics, to work together on positioning and political advocacy strategies, to share and transfer methodologies, tools and good practices, and to facilitate the articulation of actions and the complementarity of interventions. In accordance with the provisions of the fund's Constitutive Act, the administration costs of the fund cannot exceed 5% of the amounts.

==== Projects ====
The fund's investment in the 31 interventions implemented exceeds 130 million euros. To this amount must be added the more than 20 million euros that represent the counterparts of the implementing partner entities. However, depending on the region or the projects and the problems that arise, this figure may vary.

According to information from 2018, the European Trust Fund for Peace in Colombia has established around EUR$95 million (US$112 million) to enable a rapid, flexible and collective response in the very short term for the implementation of peace, especially in rural areas. In turn, Colombia is a beneficiary of budgetary support for the competitiveness and productivity of the dairy sector with an investment agreement in agriculture for EUR$70 million (US$82 million) and the program for territorial competitiveness for EUR$32.8 million (US$83.7 million). It is estimated that, during the last 15 years, the European bloc has invested the value of EUR$1.5 billion (US$1.77 billion) in peacebuilding activities in Colombia.

=== Peace Laboratories of the European Union ===
The Peace Laboratories are bilateral development cooperation programmes of the European Union (EU) in conflict zones in Colombia, whose main objective at present is to support the search for a lasting peace in the country. These EU cooperation programmes in Colombia seek to support civil peace initiatives that are already underway and aim to allocate their resources in processes that already have a history, promoting a focus on comprehensive projects that are the expression of participatory social processes, where the reappropriation of Human Rights is the basis for the reconstruction of the social fabric and the recovery of a sense of citizenship that contributes to guaranteeing lasting peace (Global Operational Plan Peace Laboratory II 6). The EU makes an interpretation of the conflict recognising three main causes: Institutional causes: high levels of violence, marginalisation and poverty accelerated by the presence of armed groups and their financing from illicit crops; absence of institutions and State policies. Social causes: lack of solidarity and social cohesion, social inequality and unequal distribution of assets. Economic causes: lack of viable economic alternatives. Conpes 3395 frames this action by defining peace and regional economic development as a long-term objective. It establishes specific objectives: support for Human Rights and promotion of a dignified life, building zones of peaceful coexistence through local institutional strengthening and civil actors that promote peace, and promoting economic and social development, including Alternative Development as far as possible. The construction of these laboratories began with a donation from the European Union of US$116 million (EUR 92 million) for three laboratories, and for their construction, certain conditions were required, such as government support, financial and political support from local institutions, no obstruction from armed groups, and no spraying of illicit crops.

==== Peace Laboratory I ====
The first laboratory had a budget of 42.4 million Euros from the European Union and 7.4 million Euros from the national counterpart. It included the regions of Magdalena Medio and, as part of its development, was implemented in 30 municipalities. Its aim was to establish in Magdalena Medio a “Peace Laboratory” that, through the defence of the basic Human Rights of all inhabitants and the promotion of sustainable human development, would contribute significantly to citizen coexistence, strengthen the peace dialogue and show effective and viable ways to overcome the conflict, which could be applied in other regions of Colombia. The plan for this laboratory was divided into two phases, the first (2002–2005) aimed at the culture of peace and integral rights, productive activities, social infrastructure and institutional strengthening. And, on the other hand, the second phase (2005–2009) consisted of the construction of scenarios of peace, concentration and Human Rights, social, cultural processes, governance and; finally, environmental productive processes for equity and Sustainable Development.

==== Peace Laboratory II ====
This second laboratory had a budget of 33 million Euros from the European Union and 8.4 million Euros as a national counterpart budget. This also had two execution periods; the first one between 2003 and 2008, and a second period between 2008 and 2009. This included the regions of Eastern Antioquia, Macizo, Alto Patía and Norte de Santander, covering about 62 municipalities. The objective of this was to establish and consolidate in the three regions of the country territorial, institutional, social, economic and cultural spaces and processes, prioritized and sustainable, resulting in a lower level of conflict and violence, as well as vulnerability of the population. For this, its operational plan focused on the implementation of a culture of peace based on the strengthening of peace dialogue, respect for human rights and a dignified life. Democratic governance, institutional strengthening and citizen participation; a sustainable socioeconomic development that improves the living conditions of the target population in harmony with the environment. And finally, awareness about the roots of the conflict, human training and education, exchange of knowledge and experiences.

==== Peace Laboratory III ====
Finally, the last laboratory received 24.2 million Euros in support from the European Union and 6.5 million Euros as a national counterpart budget. This was carried out during the period between 2006 and 2010 and was carried out in the Montes de María and Meta regions, covering nearly 33 municipalities. It sought to establish and consolidate political initiatives for peace and equitable development in the country in consultation between Civil Society and the Government of Colombia, based on territorial, institutional, social, economic and cultural spaces and processes, prioritised and sustainable, which would contribute to generating inputs for the construction of public policies, the result of which would be a lower level of conflict and violence. All this, managing as strategic pillars peace, Human Rights and a dignified life, Participatory governance, Sustainable integral development, Ethnic groups, Women, youth and other peace initiatives. Public policies for Development and Peace directed at the causes of violence and the violation of Human Rights.

== Colombia's foreign relations with EU member states ==
- Austria
- Belgium
- Bulgaria
- Croatia
- Cyprus
- Czech Republic
- Denmark
- Estonia
- Finland
- France
- Germany
- Greece
- Hungary
- (Republic of Ireland) Ireland
- Italy
- Latvia
- Lithuania
- Luxembourg
- Malta
- Netherlands
- Poland
- Portugal
- Romania
- Slovakia
- Slovenia
- Spain
- Sweden

== See also ==
- Foreign relations of Colombia
- Foreign relations of the European Union
