= Polish Colombians =

Ethnic group

Polish Colombians Polaco-colombianos Kolumbijczycy polskiego pochodzenia

Total population
- 220,000 (estimate)

Regions with significant populations
- Bogotá, Medellín, Manizales

Languages
- Spanish, Polish

Religion
- Roman Catholicism and Judaism

Polish Colombians (Spanish: polaco-colombianos) are Colombian citizens of full or partial Polish ancestry, or Polish-born people residing in Colombia. Most of the Polish immigrants that fled from the Holocaust to Colombia were Polish Jews.

== History ==
The first Polish immigrant to arrive in Colombia was Estanislao Zawadzki, who was the son of Szymon Zawadzki and Balbina Broniska. In 1830, his family was removed from their land property by the Russian authorities and began with a very difficult time of emigrating to Europe for the members. In 1846, Estanislao immigrated to Colombia for the invitation from General Tomás Cipriano de Mosquera.

The Polish engineer created roads and railways in Popayán, Cali, Buenaventura and Tumaco which dedicated to the opening of economic development. Between 1908 and 1918, ethnic Poles immigrated to Colombia with Russian, Austrian or German passports since Poland was partitioned between these countries for 123 years.

Until World War II, Polish citizens of Jewish origin fled from Nazi invasion of Poland and from economic difficulties of the war. Most Poles settled in the port of Barranquilla.

Most of the Polish immigrants that fled from Nazi concentration camps, went to South American countries that received a large number of Polish immigrants including Brazil and Argentina, although Colombia was also a destination despite political instabilities.

== Notable Polish Colombians ==
- Stella Márquez, beauty queen and Miss Colombia of 1959.
- Jonathan Werpajoski, football player
- Pawel Nowicki, theater director
- Bogdan Piotrowski, Dean of the Faculty of Philosophy and Humanities of the University of the Savanna
- Maciej Zenkiewicz, research Professor at the Universidad Externado de Colombia

== See also ==
- Colombia–Poland relations
