= Colombia–Germany relations =

Bilateral relations

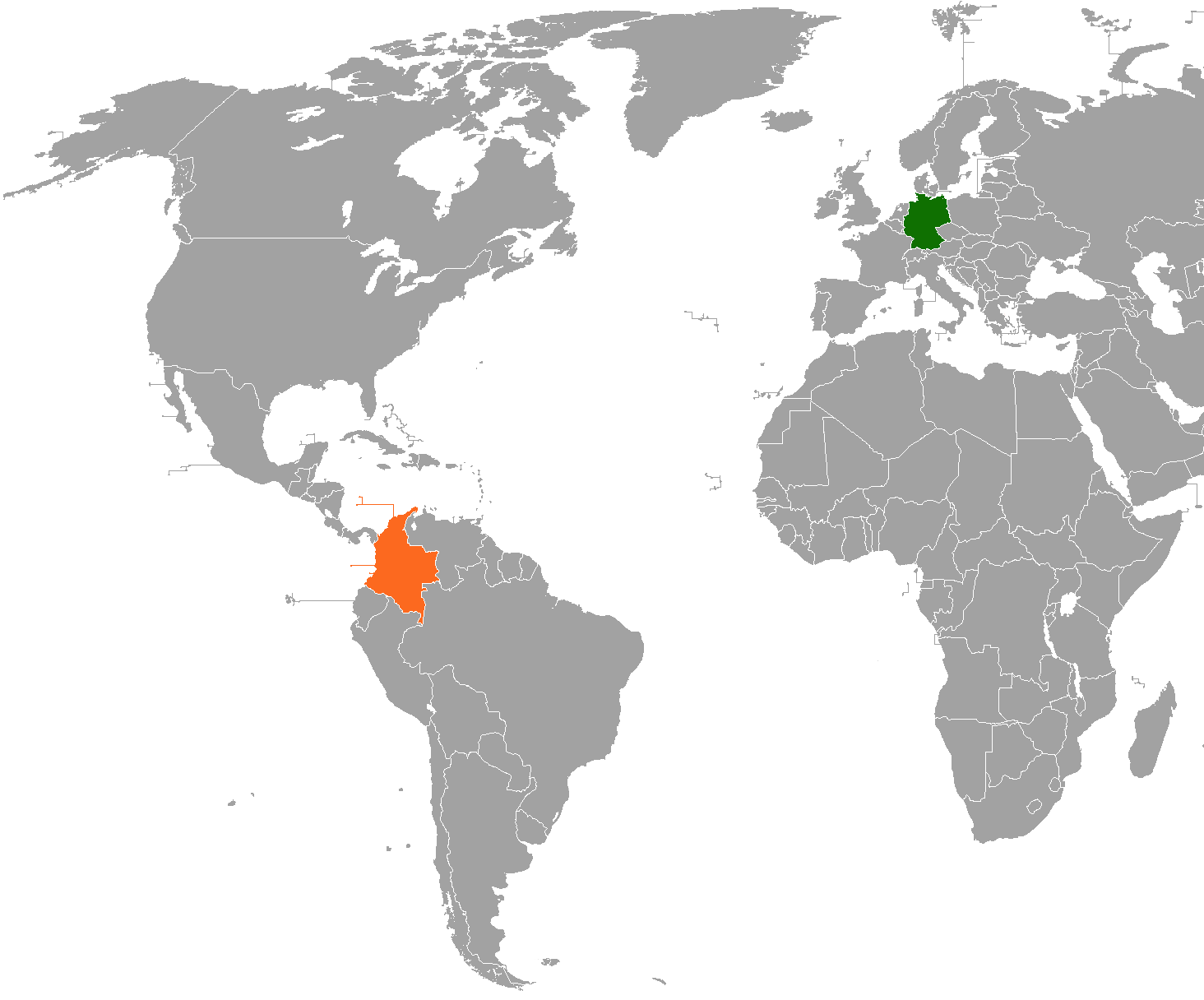

- Germany: Colombia

The Republic of Colombia and the Federal Republic of Germany have maintained historical and bilateral relations for more than 140 years since 1872. Both countries are members of the World Trade Organization and the United Nations.

== History ==
The German conquistador Ambrosius Ehinger died at Chinácota in Colombia in 1533.

In 1889, Leo S. Kopp, a native of Offenbach, Germany, founded Sociedad Kopp's German Brewery, now known as Bavaria Brewery., the largest brewery in Colombia. In 1919, the German-Colombian Airline (Sociedad Colombo Alemana de Transportes/SCADTA) was founded as the second oldest airline in the world still in existence. Its successor, Avianca, is today the largest Colombian airline.

During World War II, Colombia – after massive pressure from the US – was one of the last Latin American countries to declare war on Germany on 27 November 1943. The declaration of war did not have military consequences, but it did allow for the confiscation of property from Germans.

After the war, relations were initially resumed as trade relations. In early 1949, the Bank deutscher Länder and the Colombian Central Bank agreed that Colombia would deliver coffee (worth US$4 million), bananas (worth US$3 million), and tobacco (worth US$2 million), among other goods, to the Trizone from 1 July 1949, to 30 June 1950, and that this was to be settled with the delivery of German machinery and vehicles.

According to the German Foreign Office, "friendly and increasingly close relations" have existed between the two countries for a long time.

== Economic relations ==
Bilateral trade volume in 2021 was 2.6 billion euros. This makes Germany the fifth-largest trading partner for Colombia and the largest within the EU. A free trade agreement between Colombia and the EU has been in place since 2013.

== German Colombians ==
Famous German Colombians include:

- Ambrosius Ehinger
- Nikolaus Federmann
- Carlos Ardila Lülle
- Rudolf Hommes
- Aura Cristina Geithner
- Helmut Bellingrodt
- Antonio Navarro Wolff
- Carlos Lemos Simmonds
- Jacquin Strouss de Samper
- Nohra Puyana-Bickenbach de Pastrana
- Leopoldo Rother
- Marino Klinger
- Roberto Gerlein
- Carlos Lehder

== Diplomatic locations ==
- Germany has an embassy in Bogotá.
- Colombia has an embassy in Berlin and a consulate general in Frankfurt am Main.
