= Jhonatan Werpajoski =

Colombian footballer (born 1988)

Jhonatan Werpajoski Umbacia (born 7 April 1988) is a Colombian former professional footballer who played as a defender.
