= Colombia–Poland relations =

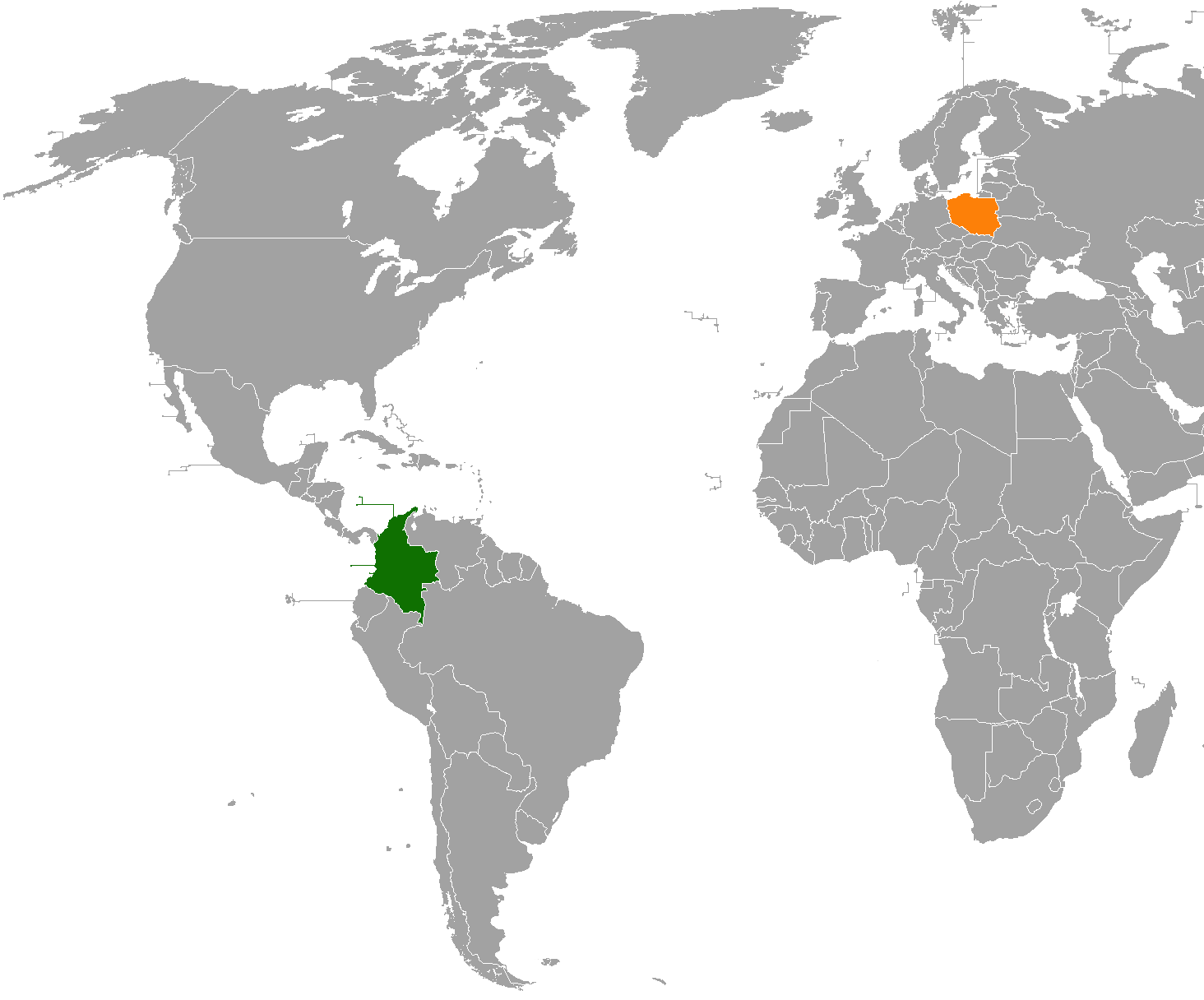
- Colombia: Poland

Colombia–Poland relations are the diplomatic relations between Colombia and Poland. Both nations are members of the Organisation for Economic Co-operation and Development.

== History ==
In 1931, Colombia and Poland established diplomatic relations. Initially, Poland accredited its diplomatic legation in Mexico City as concurrent accreditation to Colombia. Soon afterwards, Poland opened an honorary consulate in the Colombian capital of Bogotá which was later upgraded to a diplomatic legation. In 1935, Colombia opened a diplomatic legation in Warsaw. During the 1930s, a few Polish families, mainly of Jewish origin, immigrated to Colombia.

After the German Invasion of Poland in September 1939 which sparked World War II; the Colombian government allowed, in 1942, the Polish government-in-exile based in London to operate a diplomatic legation in Bogotá. In December 1941, Colombia severed diplomatic relations with the Axis powers, following the Japanese attack on Pearl Harbor, and declared war on the Axis powers on 26 November 1943. After the war, the Colombian government recognized the Polish Provisional Government of National Unity in December 1945. Between 1952 and 1964, diplomatic relations between Colombia and Poland were suspended while Colombia had an authoritarian government which coincided with La Violencia, a period of unrest in Colombia. On 28 July 1969, Colombia and Poland re-established diplomatic relations. In 1975, the first Polish ambassador arrived to Colombia and upgraded the Polish diplomatic legation to an embassy in Bogotá.

In June 1998, former Polish President, Lech Wałęsa was invited to Colombia to partake in a conference titled "Solidarity and Peace in the New Millennium". Wałęsa was also invited to the Presidential Palace and met with Colombian President Andrés Pastrana Arango. In April 2002, Aleksander Kwaśniewski became the first Polish President to pay an official visit to Colombia. In January 2018, Colombian President Juan Manuel Santos met with Polish President Andrzej Duda during World Economic Forum in Davos, Switzerland.

== Bilateral relations ==
Both nations have signed several bilateral agreements such as an Agreement on Technical and Scientific Cooperation (1967); Agreement on Cultural and Scientific Exchanges (1981); Trade Agreement (1989); Agreement on Mining and Industrial Energy Cooperation (1983) and an Agreement on the removal of visa requirements for Diplomatic Passports (2012).

== Trade ==
In 2012, Colombia (and Peru) signed a free trade agreement with the European Union (which includes Poland). In 2018, trade between Colombia and Poland totaled US$334 million. Colombia's main exports to Poland include: bananas, coal, coffee, flowers and sugar. Poland's main exports to Colombia include: telecommunication equipment, tires and electrical equipment.

== Resident diplomatic missions ==
- Colombia has an embassy in Warsaw.
- Poland has an embassy in Bogotá.
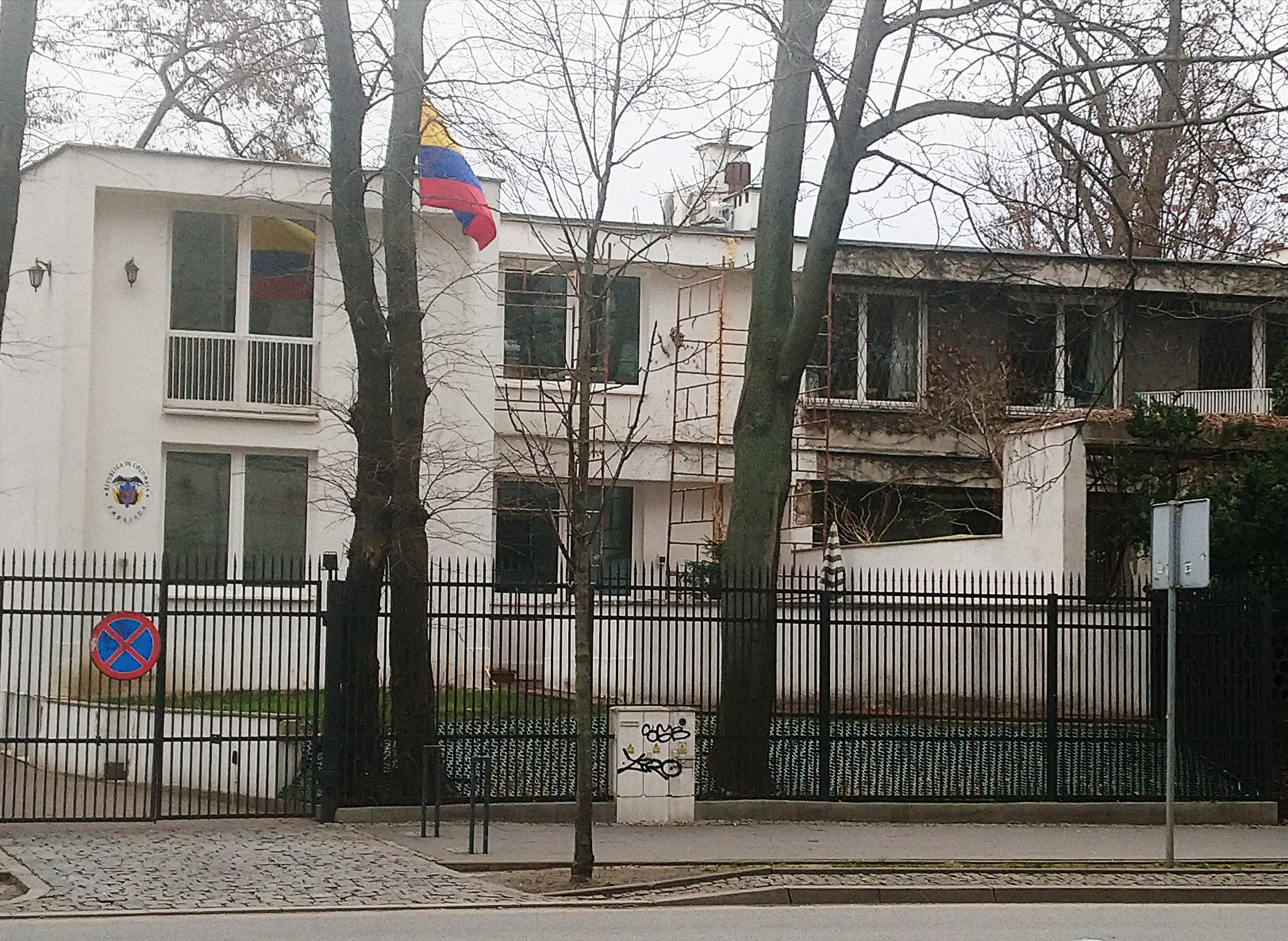
Embassy of Colombia in Warsaw

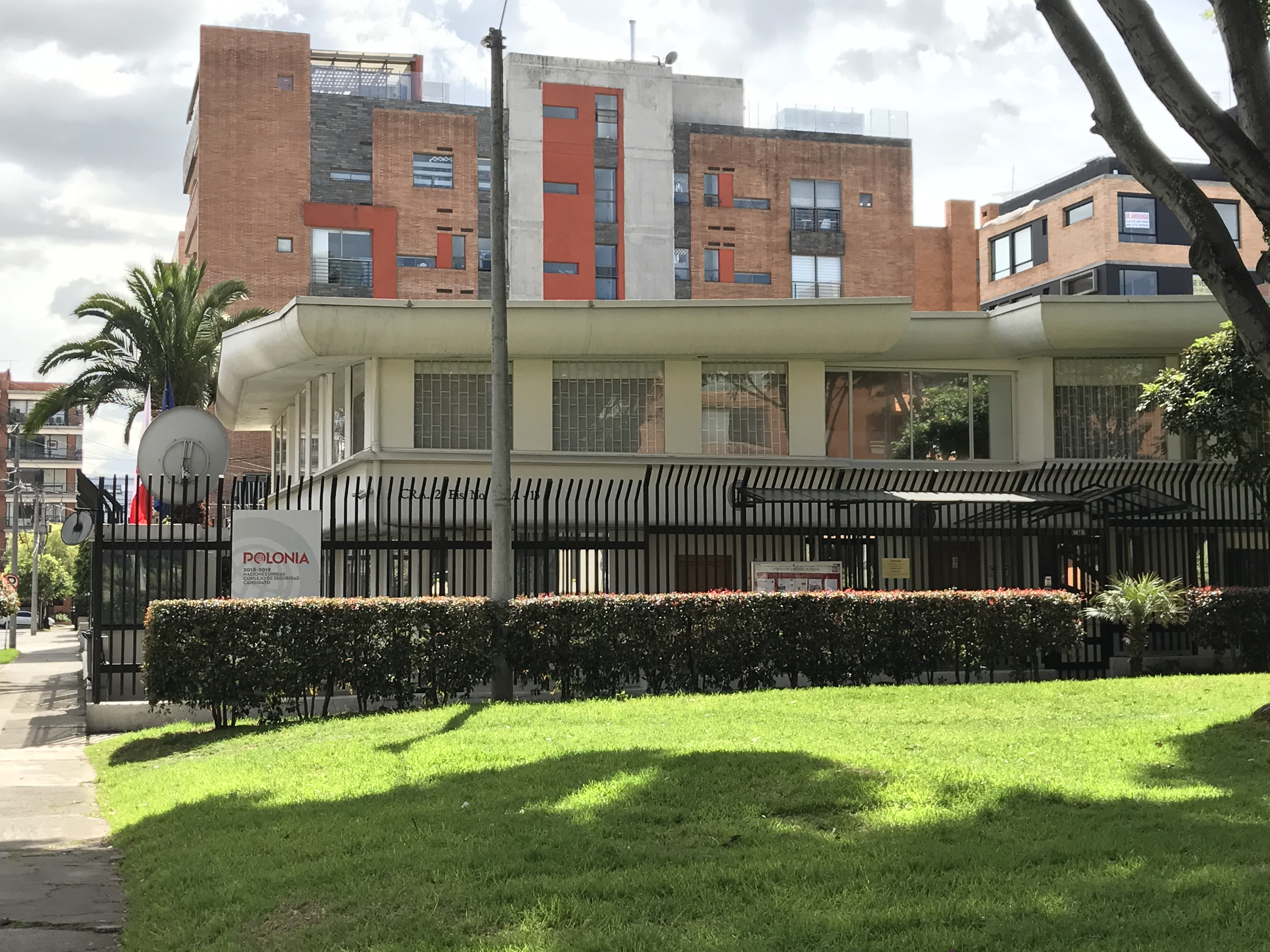
Embassy of Poland in Bogotá

== See also ==
- Foreign relations of Colombia
- Foreign relations of Poland
- Polish Colombians
