= Jacquin Strouss de Samper =

First Lady of Colombia from 1994 to 1998

First Lady of Colombia
- In role August 7, 1994 – August 7, 1998
- President: Ernesto Samper
- Preceded by: Ana Milena Muñoz de Gaviria
- Succeeded by: Nohra Puyana de Pastrana

Personal details
- Born: Jacquin Desiree Strouss Lucena; February 22, 1953 (age 73) Medellín, Antioquia, Colombia
- Party: Liberal
- Spouse: Ernesto Samper (m. 1979)
- Children: Felipe; Miguel
- Education: University of the Andes (BEc, 1976); Columbia University (MA)
- Profession: Economist

Jacquin Desiree Strouss de Samper (née Strouss Lucena, February 22, 1953) is a Colombian historian and economist who served as First Lady of Colombia from 1994 to 1998 as the wife of President Ernesto Samper.

== Personal life ==
Jacquin Desiree Strouss Lucena was born on 22 February 1953 to Herbert S. Strouss and María Inés Lucena. Her father was an American Special Forces pilot who perished in Laos during the Laotian Civil War when his aircraft was shot down while delivering supplies to American troops; she was 9 years old at the time. She attended Colegio Nueva Granada in Bogotá where she finished her primary studies, and later graduated from Colegio La Asunción. She is an alumna of the Universidad de los Andes where she obtained a degree in Economics in 1976; she later obtain a master's degree in History at Univerdidad de los Andes.

She was single and married Ernesto Samper on 16 June 1979. Ernesto and Jacquin have two children: Felipe and Miguel.

Honorary titles
Preceded by Ana Milena Muñoz de Gaviria	First Lady of Colombia; 1994–1998	Succeeded by Nohra Puyana de Pastrana
