= Nohra Puyana de Pastrana =

First Lady of Colombia from 1998 to 2002

First Lady of Colombia
- In role 7 August 1998 – 7 August 2002
- President: Andrés Pastrana
- Preceded by: Jacquin Strouss de Samper
- Succeeded by: Lina Moreno de Uribe

First Lady of Bogotá
- In office 1 January 1988 – 1 January 1990
- Mayor: Andrés Pastrana
- Preceded by: Clara Isabel Pinillos
- Succeeded by: Lía de Roux de Caicedo

Personal details
- Born: Nohra Puyana Bickenbach; 29 May 1955 (age 71) Medellín, Antioquia, Colombia
- Party: Conservative
- Spouse: Andrés Pastrana (m. 1981)
- Children: Santiago; Laura; Valentina
- Education: École française des attachés de presse(BJ)
- Profession: Journalist

Nohra Puyana de Pastrana (née Puyana Bickenbach; 29 May 1955) is the wife of the 30th president of Colombia, Andrés Pastrana, and served as First Lady of Colombia from 1998 to 2002.

== Personal life ==
Nohra was born in Medellín, Antioquia on 29 May 1955 to Eduardo Puyana Rodríguez and Alicia Bickenbach Plata. Nohra, the eldest of four children has two brothers, Eduardo and David, and one sister Laura. At a young age the family moved to Bogotá, and she attended the New Granada School where she finished her primary education and then attended the Marymount School where she finished her secondary education, and afterwards traveled to France where she studied journalism at the École Française des Attachés de Presse in Paris. After college, Puyana worked for the French magazine Elle, for Christian Dior, and for the UNESCO Press Corps.

In 1978 back in Colombia, she met Andrés Pastrana Arango, a lawyer and then Director of Guión magazine, and the son of former President of Colombia Misael Pastrana Borrero and his wife and former First Lady María Cristina Arango Vega; they were introduced at a corrida de toros in Cartagena de Indias by Juan Manuel Santos Calderón, a mutual friend of the Puyanas and the Pastranas. They met again later that year at a new year's party and they started dating shortly after. They were married in a Roman Catholic ceremony on 20 March 1981 at the Church of Saint Peter Claver in Cartagena. Together they have three children: Santiago (born 18 December 1982), Laura (born 11 May 1985), and Valentina (born 25 April 1996).

Living through Colombian armed conflict, Puyana had to endure the tragedy that beset her family during the wave of kidnappings in Colombia during the late 1980s, the whole of the 1990s, and early 2000s. On 18 January 1988 her husband, who was running to become mayor of Bogotá, was kidnapped in Antioquia by the Medellín Cartel in an effort to put pressure on the Government and prevent the extradition of Pablo Escobar and other drug lords to the United States; he was finally released a week later. On 9 April 1991, her 62-year-old father, Eduardo Puyana Rodríguez, was kidnapped while driving his car in Bogotá. His body was found on 2 April 1993 buried on a farm in the outskirts of the town of Victoria, Caldas and it was determined he had been killed a year earlier by his captors. On 27 December 2002, her maternal uncle, businessman Helmut Bickenbach Plata (aged 69), and his wife Doris Inés Gil Santamaría (aged 63), a former Miss Colombia, were kidnapped from their home in Nocaima by the FARC and held captive for ransom. They were later killed by the guerrillas on 23 June 2003 during a confrontation with the Colombian Army.

== See also ==
- María Cristina Arango Vega

Honorary titles
Preceded by Clara Isabel Pinillos	First Lady of Bogotá; 1988-1990	Succeeded by Lía de Roux de Caicedo
Preceded by Jacquin Strouss Lucena	First Lady of Colombia; 1998–2002	Succeeded by Lina Moreno de Uribe
