= Tomás Armuelles =

Panamanian colonel (???–1921)

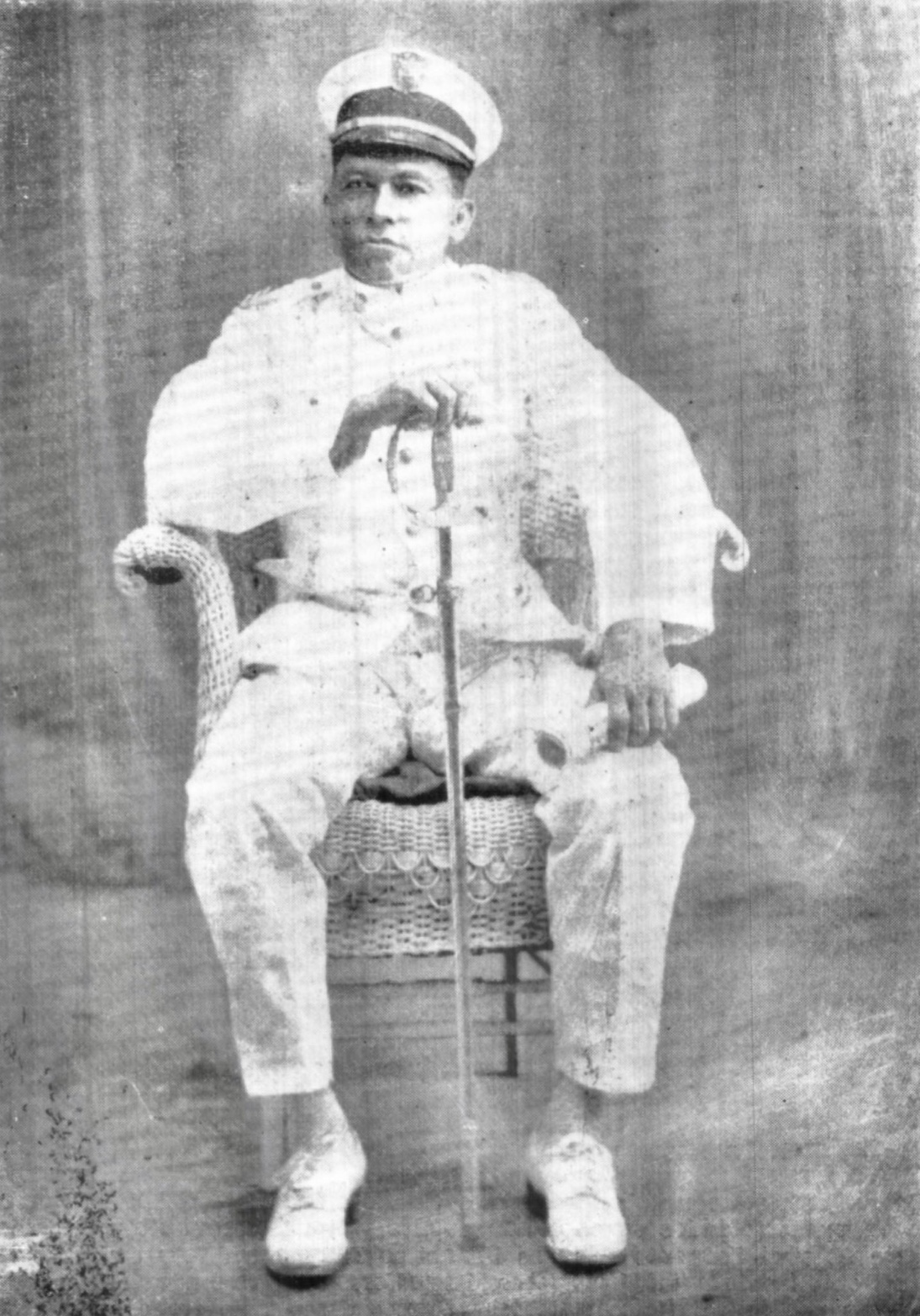
- Armuelles in the early 20th century
- Born: September 18, 1876; Las Lajas, Panama
- Died: March 18, 1921 (aged 44); Pedregal, David, Panama
- Military career
- Allegiance: Colombian Liberal Party; Panama
- Branch: Colombian National Army; Panamanian Defense Forces
- Service years: 1900–1902 (Colombia); 1921 (Panama)
- Rank: Coronel
- Conflicts: Thousand Days' War: Battle of La Negra Vieja; Battle of Corozal; Battle of Calidonia Bridge; Coto War

Tomás Armuelles Pérez (1876-1921) was a Panamanian colonel who served in the Thousand Days' War and Coto War. He was a notable figure in the Coto War, being the chief of the Chiricana Police by the time the war broke out.

== Biography ==
Tomás was born at September 18, 1876 at Las Lajas, Panama State, Colombia, as the son of Fidel Armuelles and María de los Santos Pérez. In 1900, during the Thousand Days' War, he joined the liberal forces of Belisario Porras that arrived at Punta Burica from Nicaragua. He was part of the "Líderes de Chiriquí" battalion and was under the orders of General Manuel Quintero Villarreal, fighting in the Battle of La Negra Vieja, the Battle of Corozal and in the Battle of Calidonia Bridge where the liberals were defeated on July 26, 1900.

After the Liberal defeat, Armuelles withdrew to civilian life until in 1902, he returned to join the Liberal forces of General Quintero Villarreal, stationed in the Charco Azul Bay until the end of the war. After the war, Armuelles fled into exile in Costa Rica but after the Colombian recognition of Panamanian sovereignty on November 3, 1903, Armuelles returned to Panama. He became the mayor of Boquete as well as the police chief of Bocas del Torro, Veraguas and Colon.

Later in February 1921, Armuelles was still serving as the Chief of the Chiricana police when he decided to re-enlist into military service upon the outbreak of the Coto War over the Pueblo Nuevo de Coto dispute against Costa Rica. Together with Colonel Laureano Gasca, they achieved the surrender of the Costa Rican forces in the town peacefully and managed to repel subsequent ambushes.

Having ended the conflict in March, the Panamanian forces prepared to head for Panama City to receive their corresponding honors, when on March 18, 1921, there was an accident with the Chiriquí Railroad in the port of Pedregal where the wagon that was carrying Colonel Armuelles and five other officers broke loose and fell into an estuary. Only two out of the five officers were able to get out alive, while the rest, including Armuelles, drowned.

Due to the tragedy, a general mourning was decreed for nine days by the Panamanian National Police and it was decided to rename the port of Rabo de Puerco as Puerto Armuelles in his honor by the decree of Special Law No. 27 in 1924.
