= Battle of Magdalena River =

First major battle of the Thousand Days' War

Battle of the Magdalena River
- Part of the Santander Campaign of the Thousand Days' War
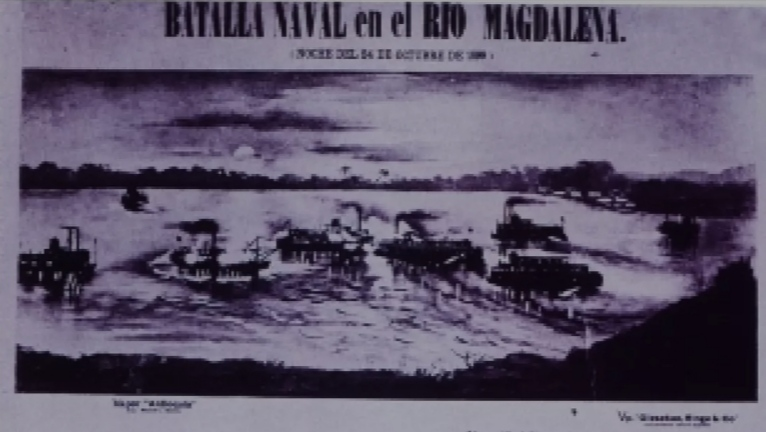
- Oil painting of the Battle of the Magdalena River by Francisco Valiente, 1899
| Date | October 24, 1899 |
| Location | Los Obispos, Magdalena, near present-day Gamarra, Cesar Department, Colombia |
| Result | Conservative victory |

Belligerents
| Colombian government Conservatives | Liberal Rebels |

Commanders and leaders
| Diego de Castro | Domiciano Nieto †; Manuel N. Vásquez †; Nicanor Guerra †; Efraín Mejía † |

Strength
| 2 gunboats: "Colombia"; "Hércules" | 1 dredger 7 passenger steamships 500 men |

Casualties and losses
| Minimal losses | 200+ killed |

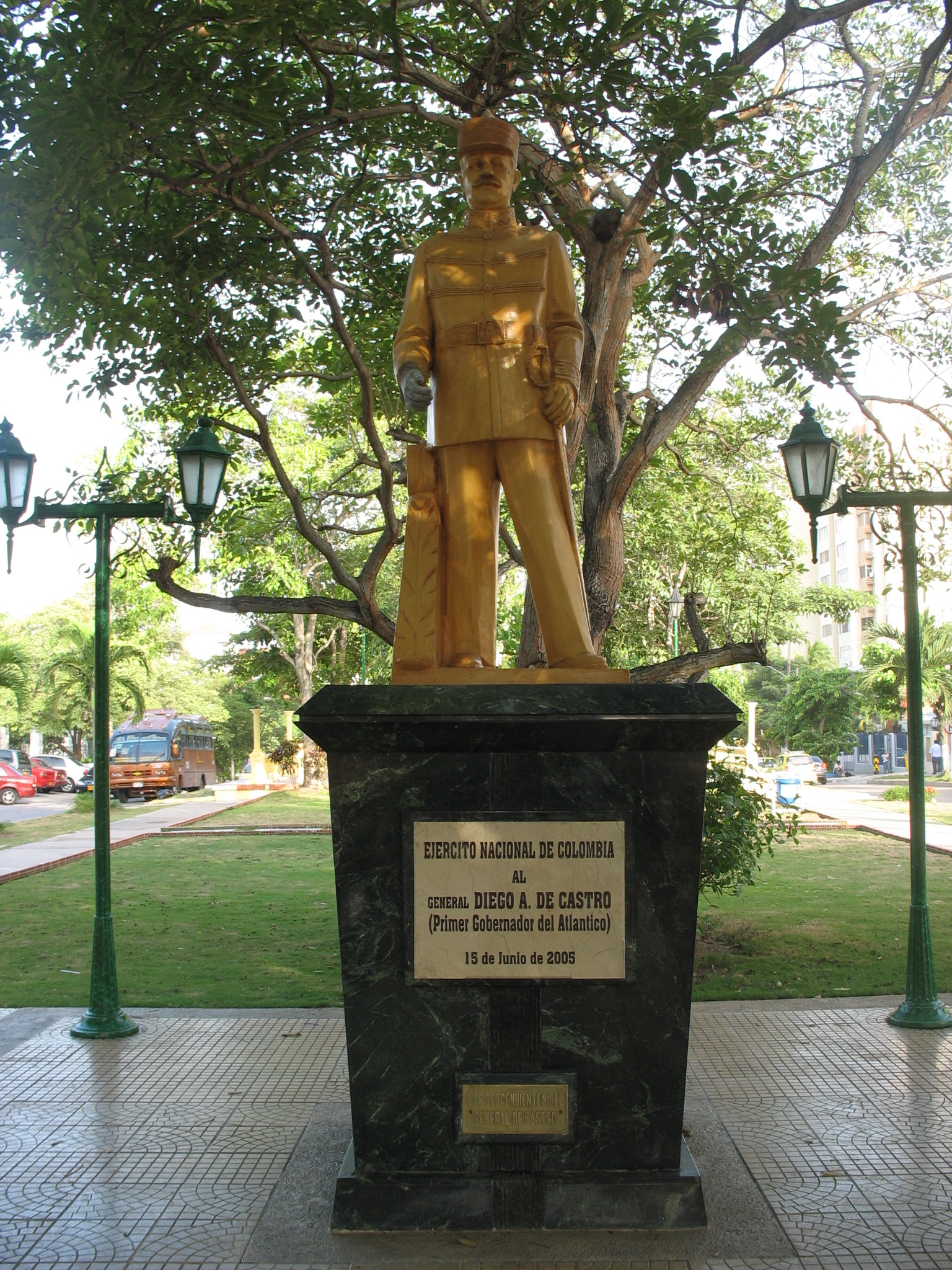
Statue of General Diego de Castro in Barranquilla

The Battle of the Magdalena River (Spanish: Batalla del río Magdalena), also known as the Battle of Los Obispos or the Battle of Gamarra, was the first major battle of the Thousand Days' War. It took place on the Magdalena River on 24 October 1899, near the town of Gamarra, Magdalena (modern-day department of Cesar), Colombia. The Liberal Party rebelled against the Conservative government of Manuel Antonio Sanclemente on 17 October 1899 and attempted to seize the Magdalena River in a bid to sever riverine transportation to Bogotá. A rebel flotilla composed of converted passenger steamships and a dredge temporarily impeded Conservative advances down the river, but on the night of 24 October, two Conservative gunboats under General Diego de Castro destroyed the rebel flotilla.

== Background ==
The Colombian Liberal Party rose up in arms against the Nationalist Conservative government on 17 October 1899. Initially, the rebel forces lacked any central authority, and local party bosses formed their own Liberal units during the war's opening weeks. Julio E. Vengoechea, a Liberal doctor from Barranquilla, seized control of the dredge Cristobal Colón on 19 October and began a blockade on the Magdalena River.

General Francisco de J. Palacio, commander of the Colombian Army's Third Division, ordered General Diego de Castro to restore control over the Magdalena and dispense with the Liberal flotilla. Castro commanded two gunboats, Hércules and Colombia, and cleared the obstacles that the rebels sank in the Magdalena before heading upstream to confront the Liberals.

== Battle ==
On the night of 24 October 1899, the two fleets engaged in combat. The Liberal flotilla included Cristobal Colón and seven passenger steamships, Barranquilla, Cisneros, Gieseken, Elena, Magdalena, Elbers, and Antioquia. While Hércules and Colombia were unified under Castro's command, a group of prominent Liberals (Domiciano Nieto, Manuel Vásquez, Nicanor Guerra, and Efraín Mejía) who dubbed themselves generals, shared control over the rebel fleet.

Hércules was armed with a Maxim gun on its bow and a Hotchkiss on the stern, as well as a M1895 Colt–Browning machine gun; Colombia had recently undergone repairs and was equipped with a single cannon. The Liberals lacked modern weaponry, armed mostly with rifles, machetes, and sticks of dynamite. The rebel flotilla approached the two Conservative gunboats just after 11:00pm. Colombia was nearly overwhelmed by three of the rebel ships after its cannon fell off the revolving platform on which it was mounted. However, the inadequacy of rebel weapons and training prevented the Liberals from successfully boarding Colombia. Further complicating matters, the Liberal commanders had been drinking heavily in anticipation of victory, and were inebriated during most of the fighting.

Hércules held off the remainder of the Liberal fleet with its machine guns and cannon. Under Nieto's orders, Elena attempted to ram Hércules, but instead struck Cristobal Colón and sank it. Most of the Liberal commanders were killed when the Cisneros was destroyed by Hércules. The battle concluded when the remaining Liberal ships ran aground. The rebels on board drowned or were captured by the Conservatives. The engagement had lasted for just over thirty minutes.

== Aftermath ==
The Liberals suffered between 200 and 500 losses at the Battle of the Magdalena River. The Conservatives suffered only a few wounded. The rebellion failed to seize control of the Magdalena River, effectively ceding open trade and transport to the Conservatives for the remainder of the war.

The Liberal forces organized more seriously after the defeat, especially as Liberal commanders of national prominence like Rafael Uribe Uribe, Benjamín Herrera, and Gabriel Vargas Santos took control from local party bosses. The rebellion would suffer an additional defeat at Bucaramanga in November 1899 before gaining significant momentum with a decisive victory at Peralonso in December.
