= Battle of Bucaramanga (1899) =

1899 battle during the Santander Campaign

- Part of the Santander Campaign of the Thousand Days' War
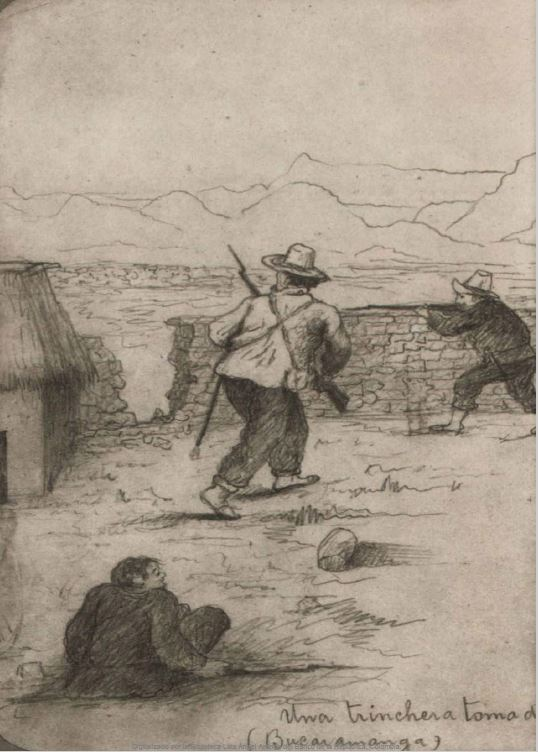
- Sketch of the Battle of Bucaramanga by rebel colonel Peregrino Rivera Arce, 1900
Date	12–13 November 1899
Location	Bucaramanga, Santander, Colombia
Result	Conservative victory

Belligerents
Colombian government Conservatives	Liberal rebels

Commanders and leaders
Alejandro Peña Solano; Vicente Villamizar; Juan B. Tovar	Rafael Uribe Uribe; Ramón Neira (WIA) (POW); Juan Francisco Gómez Pinzón †

Strength
2,500	3,000

Casualties and losses
5 officers and 2 civilians wounded No reliable estimates on additional casualties	1,500 killed and wounded Numerous POWs

The Battle of Bucaramanga (Spanish: Batalla de Bucaramanga) took place during the Santander Campaign of the Thousand Days' War in Colombia. It ended on 13 November 1899 with a victory of the Conservative forces over the Liberals after a two day battle. After an earlier defeat in a naval engagement on the Magdalena River, the Liberal rebels skirmished with the Conservative government around Piedecuesta in late October. The Conservative forces under General Juan B. Tovar conducted a fighting retreat to Bucaramanga.

At the start of November 1899, Liberal troops under General Benjamín Herrera seized Cúcuta from the Conservative garrison under Luis Morales Berti, providing a strategic base of operations for the rebels in Santander. Liberal General Rafael Uribe Uribe's forces soon advanced on Bucaramanga. They were ultimately repelled by Conservative General Vicente Villamizar, losing 1,000 dead and 500 wounded.

== Background ==
The Liberal rebels lost the opening salvo of the Thousand Days' War with their defeat at the Battle of Magdalena River on 24 October. This setback ensured that the Conservative government maintained control over the Magdalena River, a strategic source of transportation and trade that linked Bogotá to the outside world via the Caribbean. However, because the rebel forces had not consolidated into a unified command, the losses at the Battle of the Magdalena River did not seriously impede rebel advances elsewhere in Santander.

Paulo Emilio Villar, a Liberal doctor and the nominal architect behind the revolution, planned to attack Bucaramanga in order to secure the garrison's 8,000 rifles and 1,000,000 cartridges. Villar's forces joined up with rebels commanded by Juan Francisco Gómez Pinzón and other influential Liberals in the Mesa de los Santos, creating a force of around 3,000 men. Rafael Uribe Uribe arrived shortly thereafter, having met with Gabriel Vargas Santos to convince Vargas to assume supreme command of the Liberal war effort.

== Piedecuesta ==
Battle of Piedecuesta
- Part of the Battle of Bucaramanga
Date	28 October 1899
Location	Piedecuesta, Santander, Colombia
Result	Conservative victory

Belligerents
Colombian government Conservatives	Liberal Rebels

Commanders and leaders
Juan B. Tovar; Gabino Hernández; Arturo Dousdebés	Juan Francisco Gómez Pinzón; Rodolfo Rueda; Francisco Albornoz

Strength
1,200	2,000 – 2,500

Casualties and losses
41 killed 56 wounded	110 killed 102 captured

On 28 October 1899, Tovar reported that his garrison in the town of Piedecuesta was threatened by a sizeable rebel force. The rebels numbered between 2,000 and 2,500 men, led by Gómez Pinzón, Rodolfo Rueda and Francisco Albornoz. After initial skirmishing across a bridge that served as a bottleneck into Piedecuesta, Tovar entrenched some of his forces and ordered the rest to pull back. The Liberal soldiers pursued the retreating Conservatives, but were halted when the entrenched soldiers opened fire. Tovar held his position until 11 November, when he withdrew to reinforce the besieged garrison at Bucaramanga. The Liberals suffered 110 killed and 102 taken prisoner at Piedecuesta, and the Conservatives suffered 41 killed and 56 wounded.

== Battle ==
After Herrera's capture of Cúcuta, the Liberal forces had an important staging ground from which to launch an attack on Bucaramanga. Holding Cúcuta and Bucaramanga would grant the rebels significant control over the north of Santander and allow them to link up with sympathetic elements in Venezuela, under the Liberal president Cipriano Castro.

Tovar withdrew from Piedecuesta in the early morning hours of 11 November and reached Bucaramanga without detection by Liberal forces. This maneuver, once discovered by the Liberals, was misinterpreted as an indication of Conservative weakness. They believed that the Conservatives would withdraw from Bucaramanga as they had done at Piedecuesta. However, Tovar's troops consolidated with the IV Division under Vicente Villamizar at Bucaramanga. This brought the total strength of the Bucaramanga garrison, under the command of Alejandro Peña Solano, to 2,500. The garrison hoped to hold out long enough for the I and II Divisions under Isaías Luján to arrive from Chiquinquirá. However, Luján's divisions would not arrive until 21 November, long after the Conservatives had repelled the Liberal forces.

Villar designated Uribe the commander of the Liberal forces approaching Bucaramanga, with Ramón Neira second-in-command. Uribe demanded that Peña Solano and Villamizar surrender, suggesting they negotiate terms at the hacienda of Zapamanga in nearby Florida. Peña Solano and Villamizar refused to surrender, but accepted Uribe's proposal to negotiate at Zapamanga. Instead, Uribe decided to besiege Bucaramanga. Although the rebel forces numbered some 3,000 and slightly outnumbered the defending garrison, half of the Liberals were armed only with machetes. Those Liberal soldiers who lacked firearms went into combat with the goal of recovering rifles from their comrades who were wounded or killed.

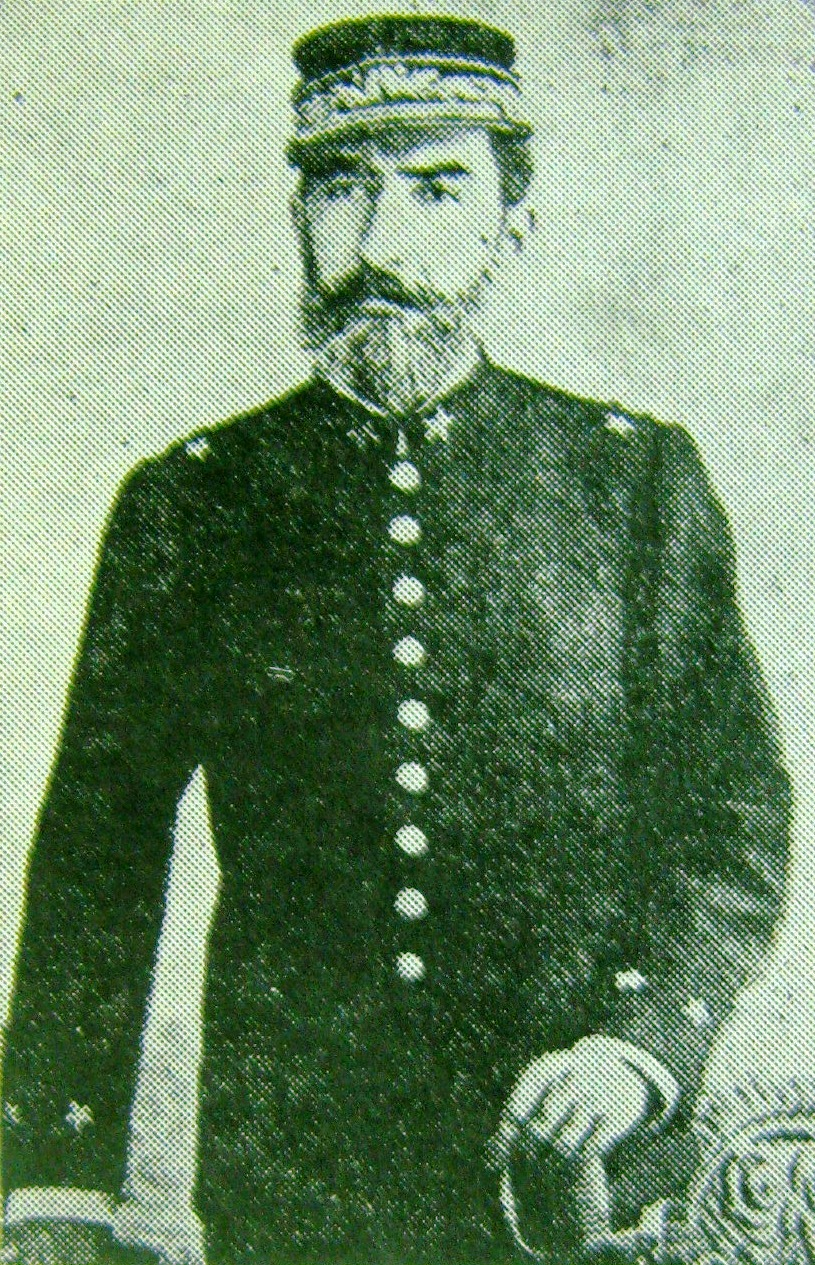
General Juan B. Tovar

Uribe hoped to encircle the garrison and force its surrender. At 03:30 the morning of 12 November, Uribe directed General Pedro Sánchez to advance on Zapamanga with orders to take the position under pretext of the negotiations, and to advance further on Bucaramanga if possible. After sunrise, Liberal Generals Agustín Neira (brother of Ramón Neira) and Juan Francisco Gómez Pinzón led their forces in house-to-house fighting along Bucaramanga's outer streets, but Neira was mortally wounded with a bullet wound to the stomach and Gómez Pinzón was killed after losing a leg. Ramón Neira received a serious wound to the stomach himself, unaware of the fate that had befallen his brother. Around 16:00 that afternoon, Pedro Soler Martínez, Uribe's chief of staff, directed a charge against Conservative positions in Bucaramanga's outskirts. This was initially successful, but the Liberal soldiers depleted their munitions. Soler ordered them to continue with bayonets, but this second attack was repelled by the Conservatives and Soler narrowly avoided falling into enemy captivity after his horse was shot out from under him.

On the night of 12–13 November, the scattered Liberal forces slept in their positions on the outskirts of Bucaramanga, periodically exchanging fire with the Conservative defenders. Agustín Neira died from his wound sometime during the night, and when the Liberal leadership learned of the deaths of so many of their generals, morale plummeted. Around 11:00 the morning of 13 November, Soler reinitiated the attack, but was forced to pull back at 15:00 when Conservative reinforcements arrived.

The Conservative defenders, protected behind the city walls, entrenched in defensive works, and armed with Mauser rifles, were able to repel the Liberal attack on Bucaramanga. Bucaramanga's sacristan, Florentino Gómez, had telephoned the attacker's positions to the Conservative command from his observation post in the church tower. After Soler's attack broke off at 15:00, Uribe withdrew the remnants of his attacking force to Florida and then to Piedecuesta the next day, en route to Cúcuta in an effort to consolidate his forces with Herrera.

== Aftermath ==
The Liberals lost 1,000 killed and 500 wounded at Bucaramanga, including generals Agustín Neira, Juan Francisco Gómez Pinzón, and Cándido Amézquita. Liberal General Gratiniano Bueno was wounded and taken prisoner, where Minister of War Aristides Fernández sentenced him to death without a trial. Ramón Neira was also taken prisoner by the Conservatives. The Conservative losses were negligible, amounting to only a handful wounded, although the Liberals claimed to have taken some 200 prisoners with them as they pulled back from Bucaramanga.

Villamizar failed to capitalize on the Conservative victory. No serious attempt was made to pursue Uribe's retreating army, until Villamizar finally ordered General Ramón González Valencia to attack Uribe on 26 November. Although the Cúcuta and Chinácota Battalions under González successfully harassed Uribe's retreating force on its way to Cúcuta, Villamizar ordered them to stop days later in order to link up with Luján's I and II Divisions. This delay allowed Uribe and Herrera to join up and pull closer to the Venezuelan border, setting the stage for the Battle of Peralonso.
