= Anzola (surname) =

Anzola is a surname. Common in Venezuela and Colombia, but can be of either Italian or Basque origin (the latter being a variant of "Anzolas"). Notable people with the surname include:

- Alfredo José Anzola (1974 – 2008), founder and the former CFO of Smartmatic
- Edgar J. Anzola (1893 - 1981), Venezuelan pioneering engineer, filmmaker, radio broadcaster, writer, journalist and cartoonist
- Ignacio Anzola (born 1999), Venezuelan football player
- Marco Tulio Anzola Samper (1892-?), Colombian lawyer and writer

== See also ==
- Anzola (disambiguation)
