= Victoriano Lorenzo =

Panamanian politician and general

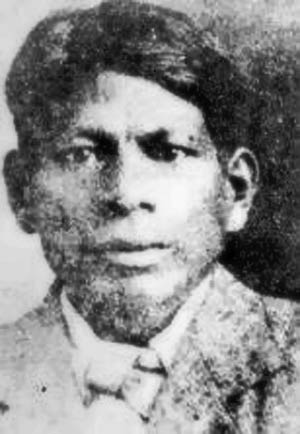
- Born: about 1867–1870; Cocle, Panama State, United States of Colombia
- Died: May 15, 1903 (aged 35–36); Plaza Francia, Panama City, Department of Panama, Colombia
- Occupation: Politician
- Known for: Thousand Days War

Victoriano Lorenzo was a Panamanian politician and general who fought for the Liberals during the Thousand Days' War. As an indigenous chief in the Coclé province, he campaigned for the land rights and representation of indigenous people, and after becoming an elected official outside of Penonome he participated in the state political structure. During the Thousand Days' War, a civil war in Colombia between the Liberal Party and the government of Colombia (backed by the Conservative Party), Lorenzo commanded troops of indigenous fighters for the Liberals. After the defeat of the Liberals at the end of the Thousand Days' War, Lorenzo and his followers insisted on continuing to fight, for which Lorenzo was executed on May 15, 1903. Lorenzo's execution precipitated the secession of Panama from Colombia and led to his status as a national hero in Panama.

== Life ==
Lorenzo was born sometime around the 1870s to poor campesinos in what is now the province of Cocle. He was considered a Cholo, of predominantly indigenous descent and Hispanic cultural background. He is remembered in rural areas, especially Coclé, as an indigenous chief who continued the cause of land rights and representation; evidence thereof includes that his father, Rosa Lorenzo, had been an indigenous leader and that Victoriano spoke indigenous languages. He also participated in the state political structure as an elected official outside of the provincial capital of Penonome.

After many attempts to address indigenous grievances about land rights, abuses, and economic disadvantages through the judicial and state bureaucracies, he became frustrated and allied his indigenous fighters with the Liberal cause. Lorenzo was quick to take arms at the advent of the Thousand Days' War in alliance with the Liberals led in part by Panamanian patriot Belisario Porras. He led troops in a Pacific coast skirmish which killed a conservative mayor and garnered him arms from the Liberals. He commanded his troops into battle in Aguadulce in January 1902, in which over 750 troops were killed or wounded on both sides, and his Liberal allies claimed 700 prisoners. Later that year, when hundreds of Liberal troops came from Nicaragua, Lorenzo sent his secretary, Papi Aizpuru, to meet them. Becoming one of the most wanted men by the Colombian central government, General Lorenzo and his wife, Lorenza Ibarra, led his soldiers to a base in the mountains known as La Trinchera, where he turned to guerrilla war to advance his cause, and averted many assassination attempts by Conservatives.

The end of the Thousand Days' War resulted in a defeat for the Liberals. General Benjamín Herrera, who had previously fought alongside Lorenzo in Aguadulce, signed a peace treaty with the Conservatives. Victoriano Lorenzo and his followers refused to give up their arms and insisted on continuing their struggle. After Herrera ordered his arrest, Lorenzo was lured into an ambush. Victoriano Lorenzo was executed on May 15, 1903 at the Plaza Francia, a tall sea wall, on the side facing Amador. Panama separated from Colombia less than seven months later. Lorenzo is buried in the Amador Cemetery.

The Panamanian public was greatly dismayed by Lorenzo's execution. Public disapproval at this execution resulted in this being the last recorded execution in Panama. It was a factor leading the Liberals to accept Panama's separation from Colombia, and led to the disappearance of Conservatives from Panamanian politics for some years thereafter. Many indigenous people in Panama view his assassination as the defeat of their autonomous land rights and access to representation in the Panamanian state structure.

== Legacy ==
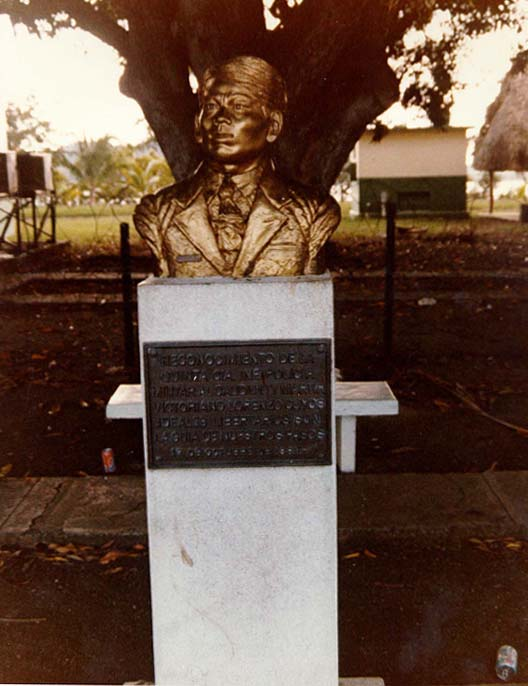
Monument to Victoriano Lorenzo, located at Amador, Panama City

Lorenzo became a national legend in Panama. Today, several monuments and plaques exist in Cocle and Veraguas in Lorenzo's honor, and official events celebrating his life and remembering his execution are held both at the commemoration of his death and on the November 3 Separation Day. Panama's controversial figure Hugo Spadafora organized a contingent of his countrymen to fight against Nicaragua's Somoza regime in 1976 known as the Victoriano Lorenzo Brigade. On January 30, 1966, the Panamanian National Assembly formally declared his execution unjust. In 2003, Panama City's Mayor Juan Carlos Navarro (PRD) also issued a formal proclamation of Lorenzo's innocence. Carlos Francisco Chang Marín, the Panamanian poet and novelist alluded to Lorenzo in almost all his works in an effort to place him as a founding father of Panama. To Chang Marín, Lorenzo was the first true Panamanian whose life story and identity parallel that of Panama as a nation.
