= Coto War =

Conflict between Panama and Costa Rica in 1921

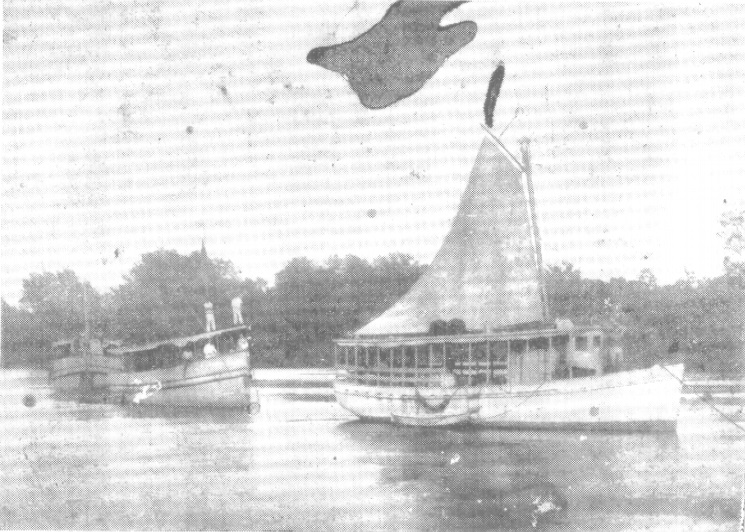
- Costa Rican ships captured by the Panamanians as a war trophy after the fighting on the Coto River.
Date	21 February – 5 March 1921 (1 week and 5 days)
Location	Panama
Result	Panamanian territorial victory, Costa Rican legal victory: Nuevo Pueblo de Coto is annexed to Costa Rica.

Belligerents
Panama	Costa Rica

Commanders and leaders
Belisario Porras; Manuel Quintero V. Tomás Armuelles	Julio Acosta; Héctor Zúñiga M.

Strength
1,700; 1 coastal steamer	2,000; 2 transport ships 1 motorboat

Casualties and losses
2 civilians killed 3 military wounded	31 killed 48 wounded 30 captured 1 motorboat captured
- Panama: 2 civilians wounded Costa Rica: 1 civilian killed

The Coto War (Spanish: Guerra de Coto) was a conflict between Panama and Costa Rica fought between 21 February and 5 March 1921. The casus belli occurred when a Costa Rican expeditionary force led by Colonel Héctor Zúñiga Mora occupied the town of Pueblo Nuevo de Coto, a hamlet on the banks of the Coto River. At that time the hamlet was in the Alanje district of the Panamanian province of Chiriquí. Zúñiga justified the incursion by the fact that there was no definite border between Costa Rica and Panama. The event ignited nationalism both in Costa Rica and in Panama.

In the Costa Rican capital, San José, and in the rest of the country, volunteers and regular forces were organized to fight against the Panamanians. In Panama, especially in Chiriqui, armed groups were organized that managed to repel the Costa Rican forces. The war moved to the north into the province of Bocas del Toro, where Costa Rica raided Panamanian troops and advanced without further resistance.

Although Panama won the war in military terms, it had to renounce the territory of Coto under pressure from the United States, who in defense of its banana companies' interests took drastic measures to stop the conflict.

== Background ==
The border between Panama and Costa Rica had not been well-defined since colonial times. In 1573, Felipe II of Spain signed a contract with Captain Diego de Artiesa y Chirinos. In this contract, he established that the northern boundary with Costa Rica extended, "everything that runs the land to the province of Veragua (west of Panama)", however, the boundaries of Veragua were never clearly defined at that time and as time passed, this territory changed in length. On occasion, he referred to Cape Gracias a Dios between Honduras and Nicaragua as the limit of the territories of North and South America.

From 1821 the Isthmus of Panama had decided to join the Great Colombia. In 1836 there was the so-called "Colombian Usurpation" in which Colombia took over the territory that is currently Bocas del Toro, which belonged to Costa Rica which could not do anything about it. In 1856, 1865, and 1873 bordering treaties were made, but they were not ratified by both governments. In 1880, Colombia seized Cocales de Burica; for this reason, on December 25, 1880, the representatives of Costa Rica and Colombia, decided to submit the arbitration of this boundary demarcation to Alfonso XII of Spain, but this treaty was rejected by Colombia.

In 1886, in Bogotá, a new convention was signed, which would be arbitrated by the then president of France, Émile Loubet. On 11 September 1900, the Loubet Judgment was issued, but it was not accepted by Costa Rica, since it harmed this country and granted Colombia more disputed territory.

In 1905, after the separation of Panama from Colombian territory, an attempt was made to sign a treaty with the new Panamanian government, but it was not ratified by it. In 1914, new negotiations were held, where the arbitration was conducted by the United States Attorney General. It was known as the Fallo White, dictated on 12 September 1914, where the Panamanian government was dissatisfied with the resolution since this ruling benefited Costa Rica. Thus, the status quo was maintained for many years until the beginning of the war.

== Battles ==
The war was fought in two separate locations. The first location was in Pueblo Nuevo de Coto and around the Coto River on the Pacific coastline. In this area, the Costa Rican forces were defeated. The second location was towards the Atlantic coastline, to the west of the province of Bocas del Toro, although without confrontations, the Costa Ricans obtained the victory.

On 22 February, the Panamanian forces under the command of Captain Juan B. Grimaldo, Lieutenant Francisco Benítez and Second Lieutenant Joaquín Amaya, together with 50 or 60 policemen from David, departed by train to La Concepción, and then continued to La Pita, Divalá and Progreso, to travel on foot to Coto. The Chiricans organized in David the First Company of Volunteers of David, that would leave once the train returned from Conceptión; under the command of Colonel Laureano Gazca, a contingent called "The 13 Volunteers of Bugaba" left La Concepción.

Within the country there was a serious problem with obtaining weapons, for two reasons: the dissolution of the Panamanian army commanded by General Esteban Huertas in 1904, for fear of a coup d'état; and the demand of the U.S. authorities for the delivery of long-range weapons. This was done in 1915, but President Belisario Porras secretly kept 50 rifles in the Presidency building with their respective ammunition, so with this arsenal and other weapons, President Porras ordered the general mobilisation for undeclared war. The president appointed General Manuel Quintero Villarreal (veteran of the War of a Thousand Days) as head of the police forces that would go to Chiriqui.

In the early hours of the 23 February, 53 policemen and 4 officers departed from the English Wharf in the city of Panama in the steamer Veraguas under the command of Quintero and in the company of the governor of the province of Panama, Rodolfo Estripeaut. After 44 hours of crossing, General Quintero and his men arrived at Rabo de Puerco (today Puerto Armuelles). Quintero established his operations center there and ordered the departure of the 53 policemen on a train from the Panama Sugar Company to Progreso to continue on foot to Coto. This troop was under the command of second lieutenant Justiniano Mejías, with the order to take Coto by all necessary means. Each of the men was armed with a 30-caliber Springfield carbine and two trimmings of 60 shots each.

After crossing several rivers, swamps and other obstacles on foot, the 53 police officers and officers met on the 26 February on the Lagarto River, with the police officers coming from David and the 13 volunteers from Bugaba, who were armed with machetes and two shotguns. All were under the command of Mejías. Everyone arrived at Coto at dawn on the 27 February.

While the Panamanians organised themselves to carry out their orders, two Costa Ricans who were touring the place were captured. Surprisingly, one of them turned out to be Colonel Zuniga Mora, chief of the Costa Rican expedition, and the other was Colonel Daniel González. Both assured that they were hunting. Mejías demanded that Zúniga Mora surrender the detachment; the Costa Rican expeditionaries had no choice. The Panamanians had recovered Coto without combat, they had the Ticos as prisoners and they were reinforced with more rifles and ammunition.

Mejías feared the arrival of Costa Rican reinforcements along the Coto River, so he ordered scouts to explore the place, locate the sentinels and take positions between the forests and mangroves. On the afternoon of the 27 February, the motorboat La Sultana was approaching with Costa Rican troops who were cheering their country and president Julio Acosta, confident that the detachment of Zúñiga Mora would receive them. At the sound of a bugle, the Panamanians opened fire with their rifles. Within a couple of minutes the motorboat ran aground and its crew surrendered with the result of five killed, nine wounded and 54 captured. It was arranged that the wounded and prisoners were taken in La Sultana to Rabo de Puerco. A group of Chiricans under Colonel Gace, had the mission to take the ship and leave on the morning of the 28 February to navigate the Golfo Dulce until reaching the destination.

On the morning of the 1 March the Costa Rican ship La Estrella arrived, ignoring what happened and had an outcome similar to that of La Sultana. In the fight there were 27 dead, numerous wounded and a great amount of arms were captured by Panamanians, who distributed the arms among the First Company of Volunteers of David.

At sunset that day another ship arrived, La Esperanza with 56 soldiers and volunteers, also mistakenly expecting that the men of Zúñiga Mora were waiting for them, the ignorance was such that when they arrived, a phonograph was played on the bow of the ship touching the notes of the national anthem of Costa Rica; this started a shootout killing the one who put the phonogram. Daniel Herrera, who commanded the ship thought it was a mistake but it was not and followed the shooting leaving.

== Aftermath ==
In late February, the United States demanded that both countries cease hostilities and withdraw belligerent forces. With no other options, the leaders of both countries announced a cessation of hostilities and ordered their respective armies to abandon the positions, which they were holding.

In David, the Panamanian soldiers were received as heroes by the population and a similar tribute was received in the capital by General Quintero and his men by President Porras and by the citizenship.

Panama was forced by the United States to accept the White Ruling of 1914, which required Panama to cede the Coto region to Costa Rica (after Costa Rica had ceded some land to Panama on the Atlantic side). The border problems between both countries were definitively resolved with the signing of the Arias-Calderón treaty in 1941.

On the 18 March, at the port of Pedregal near David, the last carriage on a train broke loose from the other carriages, and fell down the side of an adjacent hill before plunging into an estuary. There were passengers on board the carriage as well as a number of crates of ammunition. Four people were killed and several more were injured in the accident. The dead included Colonel Tomas Armuelles, Colonel Benjamin Zurita, Captain Arcadio Porto and Adjutant Francisco Duran, who all drowned when they were pinned down by fallen ammunition crates. The injured included Colonel A.R. Lamb and a Captain Yebras.

== See also ==
- Costa Rica–Panama relations
