= Battle of Palonegro =

1900 battle of the Thousand Days War

- Part of the Santander Campaign of the Thousand Days' War
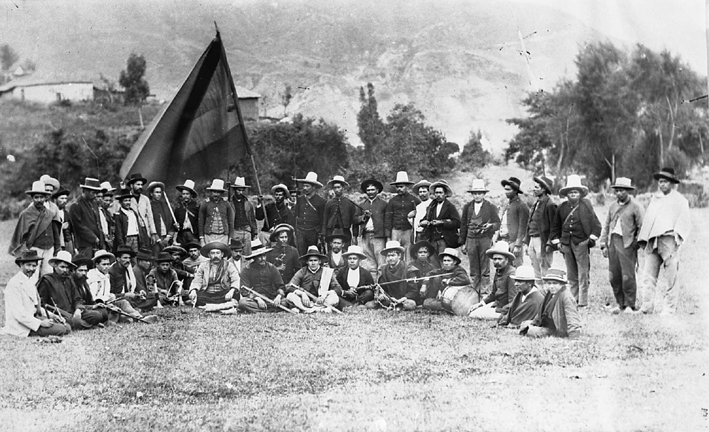
- Government soldiers before the battle posing next to the Colombian flag.
Date	11–26 May 1900
Location	Santander Department, Colombia
Result	Conservative victory

Belligerents
Colombian government Conservatives	Liberal Rebels

Commanders and leaders
Próspero Pinzón; Jorge Holguín; Ramón González Valencia; Henrique Arboleda Cortés	Gabriel Vargas Santos; Rafael Uribe Uribe; Benjamín Herrera

Units involved
Army of the North: 21 Infantry Divisions (numbered 1–21); Urdaneta Artillery Battalion; Polytechnic Artillery Battalion	Autonomous Revolutionary Army of Rafael Uribe Uribe; Autonomous Revolutionary Army of Benjamín Herrera; Autonomous Revolutionary Army of Sarmiento; Autonomous Revolutionary Army of Ulloa; Autonomous Revolutionary Army of Leal; Autonomous Revolutionary Army of Diaz; 250 militia; 800 locals

Strength
21,600	7,000–10,000

Casualties and losses
1,500 dead 2,800 wounded and missing	4,000 dead wounded and missing

The Battle of Palonegro was a battle in the Santander Department of Colombia, that lasted from May 11—26, 1900, in the early days of the Thousand Days War. The commanding general of the Liberal armies, Gabriel Vargas Santos, ordered his troops to retire to Palonegro, near the city of Bucaramanga in the Santander Department of Colombia. After the battle, the war escalated, and became one of the most brutal conflicts in early 20th century South America.

== Background ==
After the Liberal victory in the Battle of Peralonso on December 15, 1899, the Liberals could have chosen to march unopposed on the capital, consolidating the defeat of the Conservatives. General Vargas Santos, commander of the Liberal army, believed it was dishonorable to attack the dispersed government army, and ordered that his troops move to Cúcuta, many kilometers from the site of the battle.

By the time the General decided to recommence the war in February, fighting off mosquitoes and fever, the new Conservative army was fresh and well supplied under the command of the general Próspero Pinzón, and had cut off all routes of escape.

== The battle ==
On May 11, 1900, the Liberal advance arrived at the outposts in the Canta mountains, in between Bucaramanga and Lebrija, beginning the longest battle of the war. Fifteen days of intense combat on a front of 26 kilometers of trenches took place in the hills of Palonegro.

After the battle, the doctors who took care of the wounded and dead recounted stories of the brutality of the battle. Sources put the dead at 2,500, 1,500 Liberals and 1,000 Conservatives. The battle ended on May 26 when the Liberals began to abandon their positions in order to retreat.

== Aftermath ==
General Vargas Santos unexpectedly opted to lead his troops to safety via the jungle of Teorama. From that point on, the war began to escalate, ending with the defeat of the Liberals.

== Gallery ==
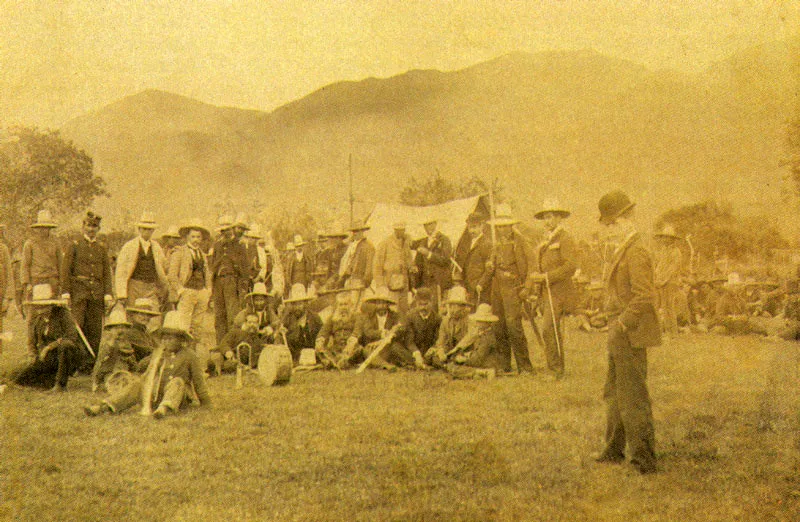
Government troops before the battle.

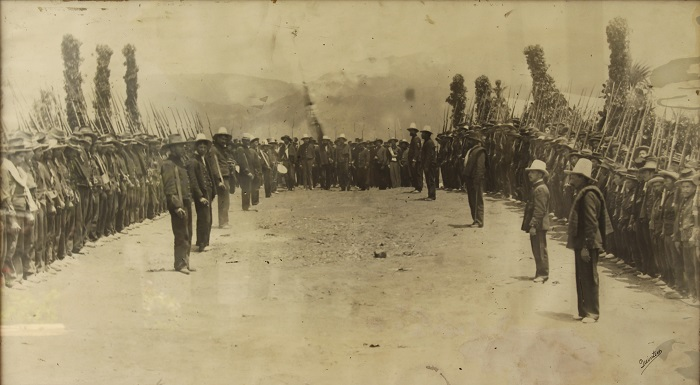
Government troops getting ready before the battle.

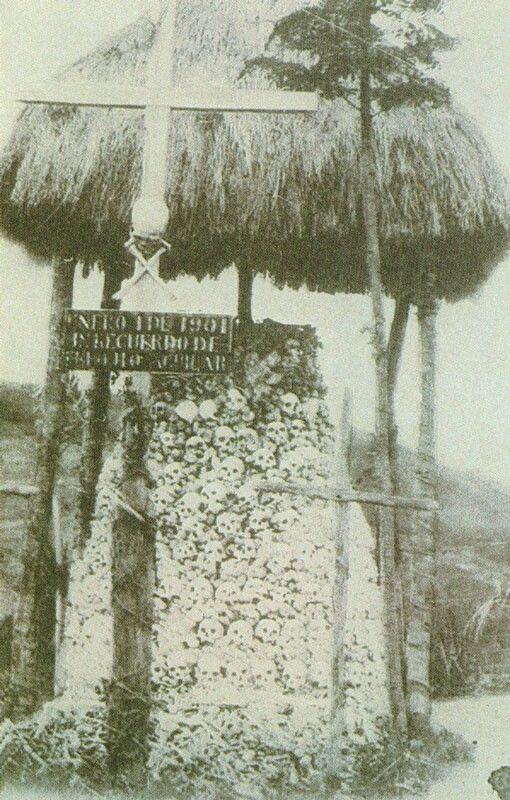
Ossuary raised to unidentified victims after the battle.

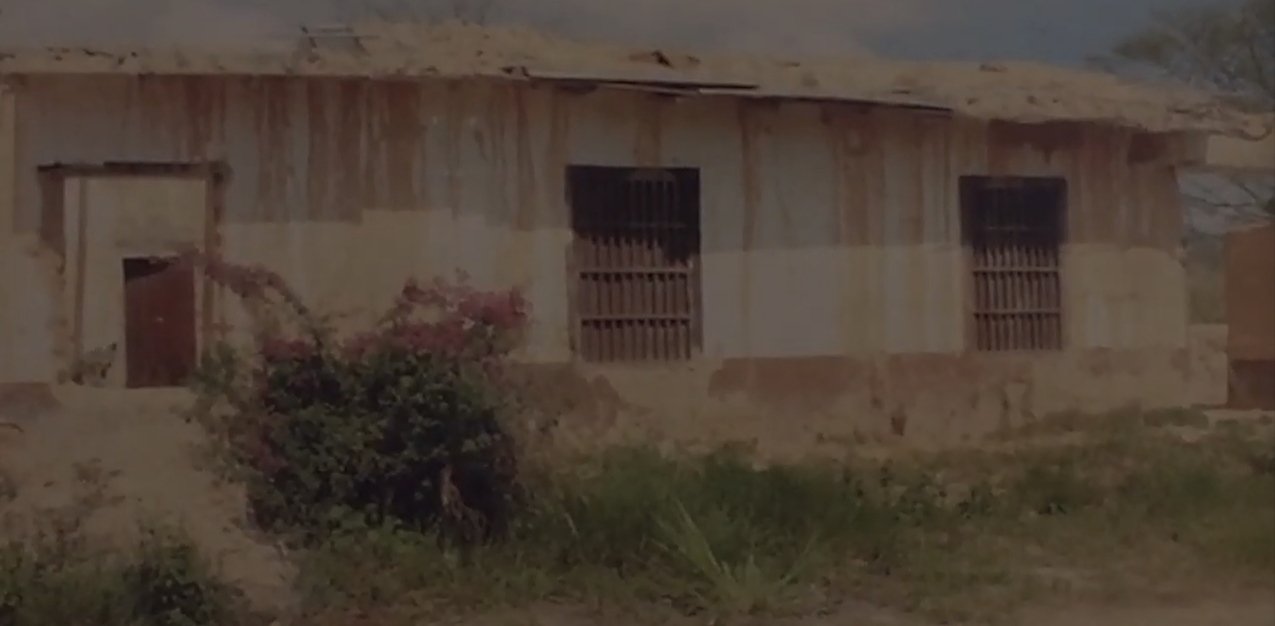
Current challenges of one of the makeshift hospitals during the battle.

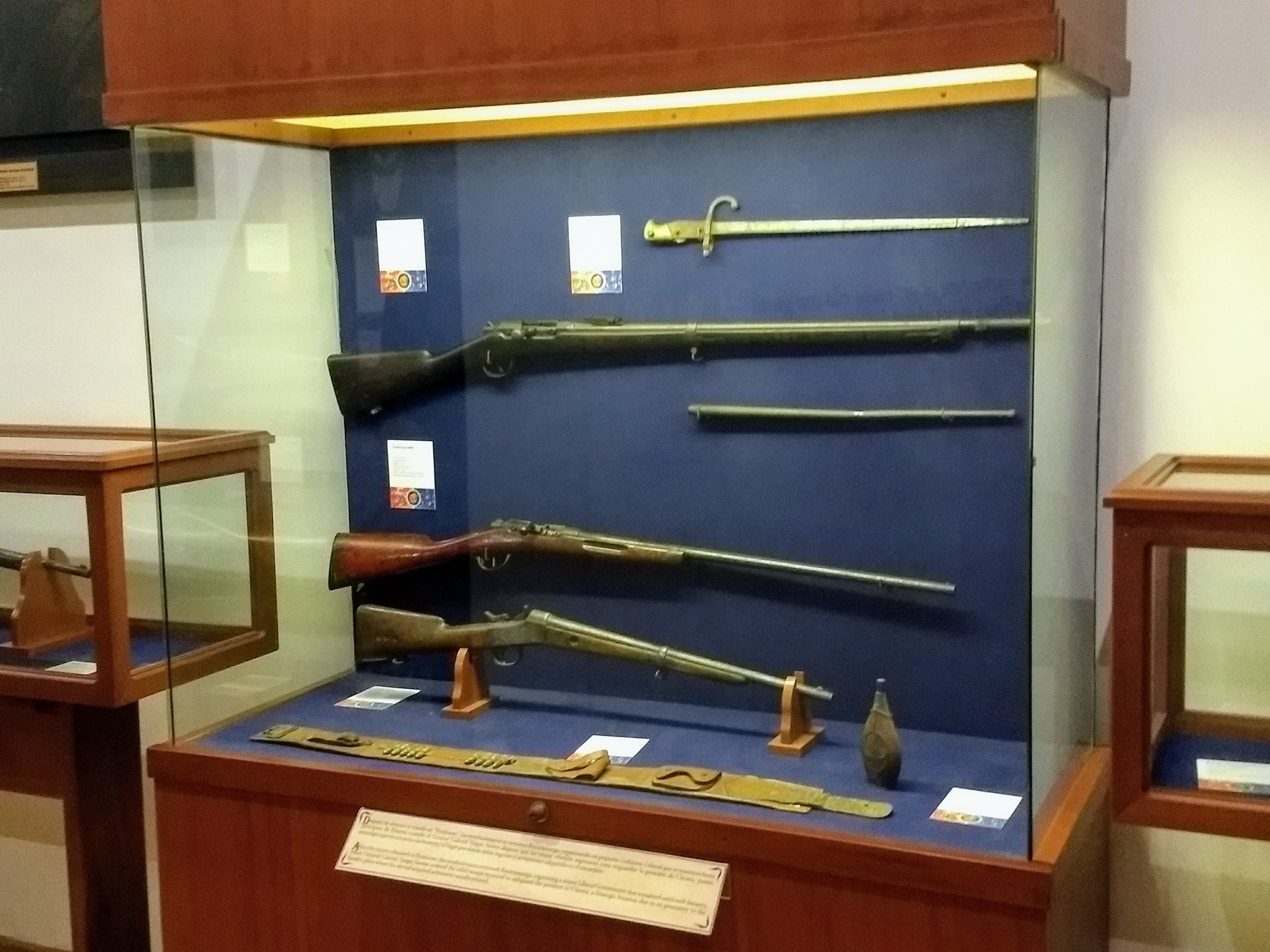
Weapons and tools used during the battle at the Batalla de Palonegro Military Historical Museum, Bucaramanga.

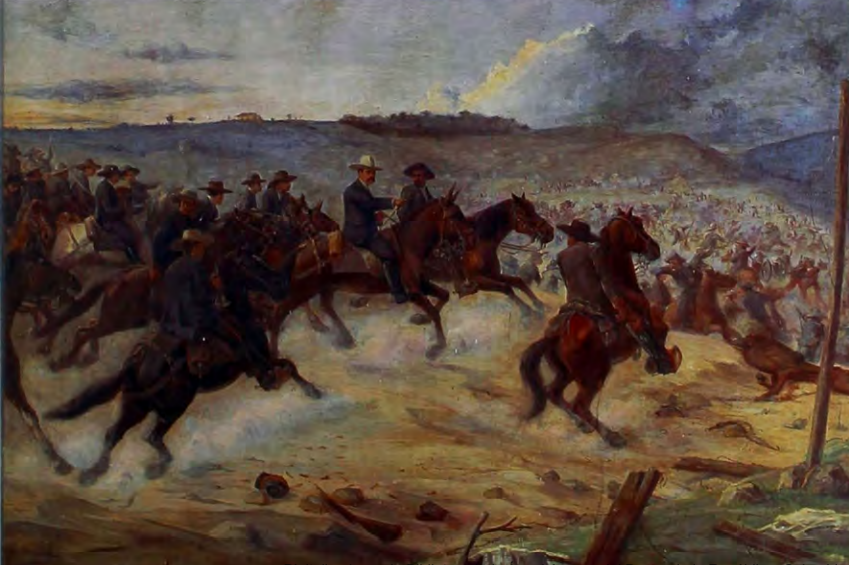
Painting by Marco Tobon Mejia that represents the heat of battle.

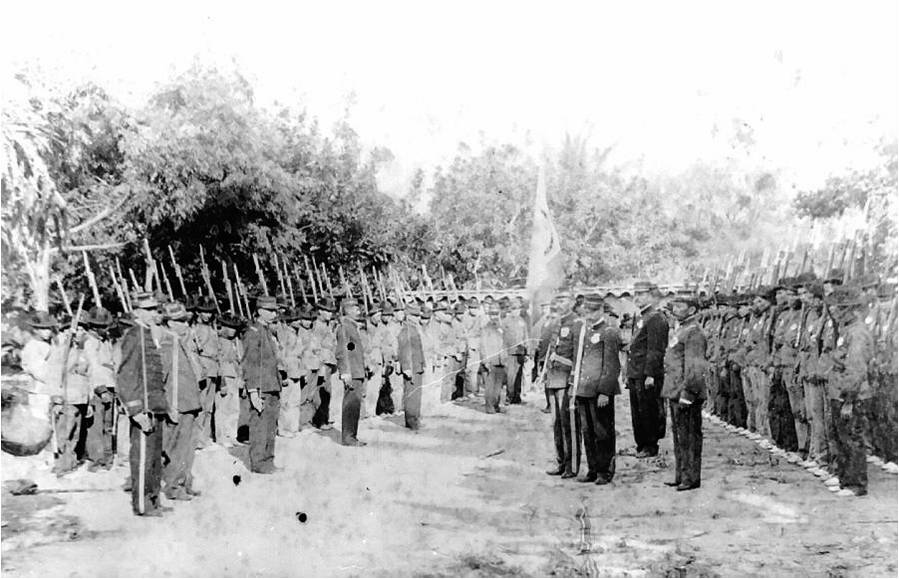
Government troops getting ready before the battle.

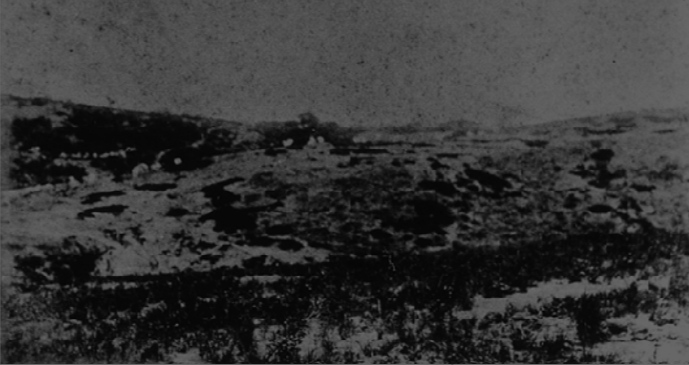
Battle of camp palonegro.
