= Puerto Armuelles =

Coordinates: 8°17′N 82°52′W

Puerto Armuelles Rabo De Puerco El Petrolero
- City and corregimiento
- Nickname: The petroleum capital of Panama
- Puerto Armuelles global positioning
- Country: Panama
- Province: Chiriquí
- District: Barú
- Founded: 1928
- City Status: 1990

Government
  - Type: Cosmopolitan borough, City
  - Governing body: Puerto Armuelles City Council

Area
  - Land: 124.1 km^{2} (47.9 sq mi)

Population (2023)
  - Total: 12,249
  - Density: 98.7/km^{2} (256/sq mi)
- Population density calculated based on land area.
- Climate: Am

Puerto Armuelles is a city and corregimiento on Panama's Pacific coast in western Chiriquí Province adjacent to Costa Rica. It is the seat of the Barú District and the second-largest city in Chiriqui province with a population of nearly 25,000. Puerto Armuelles has two different types of deep-water ports, one for bananas, and one for oil.

== Overview ==
Puerto Armuelles is situated on the Pacific Ocean. Beginning in 1927, the town was built by United Fruit Company. The name, Puerto Armuelles, was given to the city in honor of one of the heroes of the Coto War, Colonel Tomás Armuelles. Colonel Armuelles was a member of the Panamanian Defense Forces. On March 18, 1921, he died in a train accident during the Coto War between Panama and Costa Rica. Puerto Armuelles had formerly been called "Rabo de Puerco" or "Pigtail".

Puerto Armuelles is in the Chiriquí Province of Panama. The capital of the province, David, is 60 miles (97 km) away. It is only 5 miles (8.0 km) from the border with Costa Rica as the crow flies but the border crossing is 21 miles (34 km) away at the town of Paso Canoas. Panama City is some 235 miles (378 km) away, or approximately 6–8 hours drive on the Pan American Highway.

Puerto Armuelles was once the center of Chiquita Banana's banana business, but the company left in 2003 amid labor disputes, selling its Puerto Armuelles assets to a cooperative of local banana workers called Coosemupar. After Chiquita left, Puerto Armuelles' population dropped significantly. In 1990, its population was 46,093. By 2000, only 22,755 people remained. In 2010 the population was 20,455.

Puerto Armuelles is in the Chiriqui Province and next to Costa Rica on a shared peninsula

Panama fought Costa Rica in the 1920s near Puerto Armuelles in what is called the Coto War. This war was fought over a relatively small piece of territory. Panama was victorious. However, in 1940, Panama gave the territory back to Costa Rica. This happened after the dispute was mediated by the US and found in favor of Costa Rica. The President of Panama decided to abide by that ruling although it was a very unpopular decision in Panama. An interesting side note is that today Panama and Costa Rica both have no military, just civil defense forces. Both countries, although doing so decades apart, felt that this was the only way to end military takeovers of their governments. For more information see military of Panama.

== Heavy industry and petroleum ==
Puerto Armuelles has some oil-related employment due to the size or lack of it, of the Panama Canal. The Panama Canal cannot handle supertankers and, therefore, not able to cross over to the Atlantic Ocean and then onward to the refineries of Houston and the Gulf coast. About 6 miles away from Puerto Armuelles, on Punta Burica, in the deep water of Charco Azul or in English "Blue Ditch" an ideal place was found to unload supertankers. They would then put the oil into Panamax tankers so the oil could then cross the canal and on to the U.S. refineries. Very soon after that operation started, it was decided that would be better to have a pipeline. The pipeline was built in 1982, at that same spot, which they dubbed the Petroterminales of Panama. The pipeline starts at the PTP and ends at the town of Chiriqui Grande, on the Caribbean coast in the Bocas del Toro province, goes over the mountains between the PTP and Chiriqui Grande with the help of pumping stations like that at Boquete. From there, supertankers are filled with oil and then transported to refineries.

Road to Puerto Armuelles

At one time there was a lot of talk of a refinery being built out by the PTP. In 2006 it was announced that Puerto Armuelles was in the running to be considered for a refinery. Occidental said they were interested. At the time, it was estimated that the refinery, with a cost of about $7 billion dollars, will be able to process 400,000 barrels (64,000 m^{3}) of heavy crude from Mexico, South America, and the Middle East. In 2009, due to the economic downturn globally, the plans for a refinery were put on hold. It currently seems extremely unlikely that a refinery will be built. However, the number of oil holding tanks at PTP increased. These are so large that they can be seen from Puerto Armuelles.

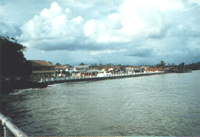
Downtown shore line

== Earthquakes ==
Center of Puerto Armuelles

Earthquakes have hit Puerto Armuelles several times, including in July 1934 as well as on Christmas night 2003, both of which killed several locals. On July 1, 1979, an earthquake destroyed the poorly built multistory high school, but the school was not in session because it was a Sunday afternoon. The oil terminal also suffered extensive damage worth $2 million, including the loss of a very expensive part into the deep water of Charco Azul, and, although divers were contracted, the steep descent of the ocean floor led to the part rolling off and never being recovered.

Beyond the earthquakes which are common anywhere in the Pacific Rim of fire, Puerto Armuelles' weather is tropical weather for latitude 8.28333 degrees. Highs around 92 °F most days and lows around 72 °F at night. The beach is nearby if it is too hot or up the mountain to Volcán Barú, which towers over the area at 11,400 feet (3478 m) high, and can be seen from the hills of Monte Verde. Puerto Armuelles currently is "a company town which lost its company" according to the weekly newsletter "So you want to retire to Panama" May 9, 2005 edition by Paradise Services. The mass migration of young people to the big cities, particularly Panama City, has been ongoing for decades like in U.S. rural areas.

== Future of bananas ==
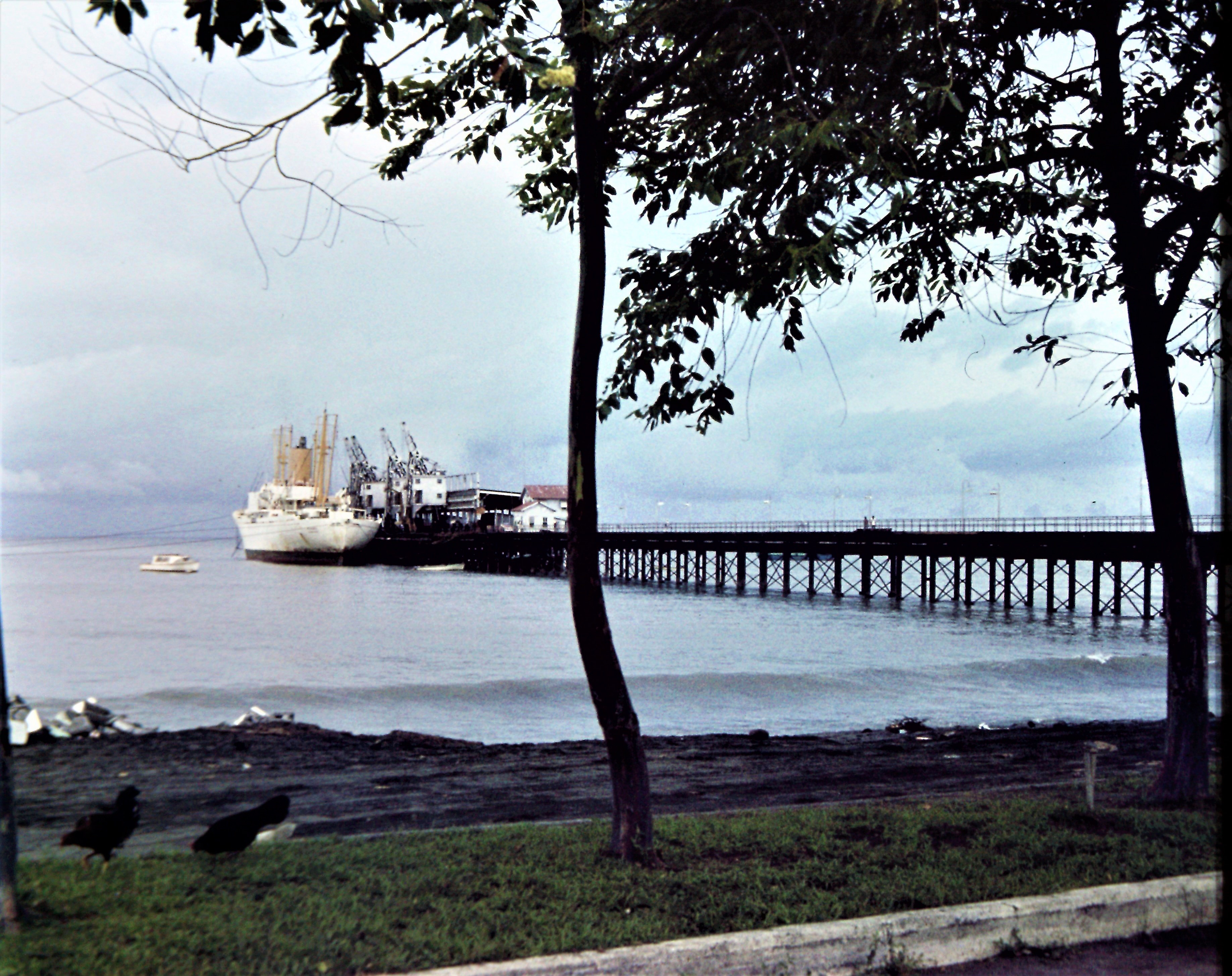
The German reefer ship MV Pekari at the Pier of Puerto Armulles, 1976.

The worker's cooperative, Coosemupar, did not do well after Chiquita left. In 2003, with government help, Coosemupar purchased Chiquita's Puerto Armuelles banana operations, but relied on the Panamanian government to continually subsidize operations. Coosemupar tried to sell its operations for years, but no new banana company has wanted to start a business saddled with Coosemupar's enormous debt. Finally, the government refused to subsidize Coosemupar any longer. In 2008, the government entered into negotiations with Chiquita to return and produce bananas in Puerto Armuelles, but those negotiations fell through.

The government, like Coosemupar, wanted to sell the banana plantations and operations to a banana company. Consequently, in January 2012, President Ricardo Martinelli and members of Coosemupar signed an agreement that states that the government will pay off Coosemupar's 19.7 million dollar debt, which means the 24 banana plantations will revert to government ownership; give relief and land to the workers who still live on the plantations; sell the 24 banana plantations (fincas) to the company(s) that will provide the greatest number of jobs.

In 2016, the government began negotiating with Del Monte Foods. On 25 May 2017, Bill 488 for the enactment of contract 36-2017 was signed into law to facilitate a 20-year banana production contract with Del Monte subsidiary Banapiña to lease and develop 5,804 hectares in Chiriquí and as well as land in Bocas del Toro.

== Road expansion and port ==
During President Martinelli's term, money was allocated to widen the road to Puerto Armuelles from a two-lane into a four-lane road. The road that links Puerto Armuelles to the Pan-American Highway (called the "InterAmericana" in Panama) at Paso Canoas. Paso Canoas is the border town of Costa Rica and Panama, on the Pan-American Highway.

According to the Panama government, one of the key reasons for this road expansion project is to service a proposed deep container port outside of Puerto Armuelles. The proposal is for this multi-purpose port to include 217 storage facilities, a deepwater container, a future cruise ship port, and a marina. The idea is that the expanded road and the proposed port would create what the Panama government is callings a four-lane “dry canal” highway connecting Puerto Armuelles to Chiriqui Grande on the Caribbean side of Panama. They are hopeful that it would have a similar economic effect as the “wet canal” in Panama City.

As part of a USD$3 billion government plan to refurbish 26 Panamanian ports, through 2040, the Panama Marine Authority authorized extensive upgrades to the port in October 2022, with the USD$21.2 million contract awarded to the ASOBUZ consortium. Construction began in July 2023. In January 2026, with the multipurpose port project at 50.8% completion, the expansion was increased to accommodate a higher operational capacity than originally planned, with its budget increased by almost 50%. By August, the access viaduct had been completed, the project had reached 72% of the port's physical expansion and 80% completion of its administrative offices.

Since 2025, several environmental groups have advocated for Puerto Baru, a proposed international port development 50 miles east in David, to be relocated to Puerto Armuelles.

== Personalities ==
- Silvano Ward Brown, serial killer
- Omar Moreno, baseball player
