= Manuel Quintero Villarreal =

Panamanian general (1860–1954)

Manuel Quintero Villareal
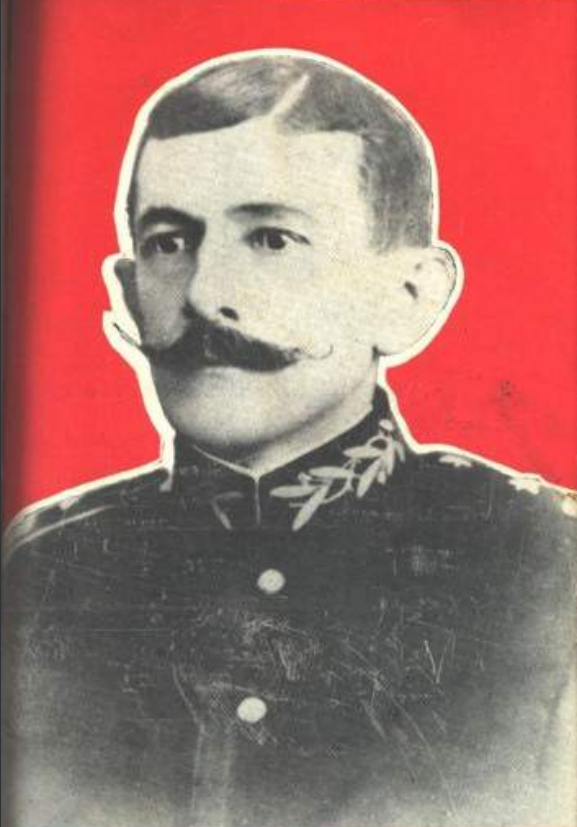
- Born: November 17, 1860; Pesé, Panama, Granadine Confederation
- Died: February 22, 1954 (aged 93); Panama City, Panamá Province, Panama
- Military career
- Allegiance: Panama
- Branch: Panamanian Defense Forces
- Service years: c. 1899 – ???
- Rank: General de Ejército
- Conflicts: Thousand Days' War; Coto War

Manuel de los Dolores Quintero Villarreal was a Panamanian general and politician during the early 20th century. He was known for being one of the main figures during the Coto War as well as a participant in the Thousand Days' War. He was also the Porrista Liberal Party nominee of the 1924 Panamanian general election.

== Biography ==
Manuel was born on November 17, 1860, as the son of Manuel Salvador Quintero Peña and Martina Josefa Villarreal Marquez at Pesé.

As a young man he moved to the city of David, Chiriquí where he held various public offices such as the City Council Clerk, Municipal Judge, David District Mayor, and Circuit Judge. Around the same time, he married Amelia Maria De Arco Gonzalez on June 23, 1896, and had one son. During the Thousand Days' War, he was part of the liberal faction and served as Civil and Military Chief of the Chiriquí Province. In 1902, he was appointed the Secretary of the Navy.

After the separation of Panama from Colombia in 1903, he held various public positions in liberal governments including the Secretary of Development. In 1921, he served as Secretary of Development and Public Works. With the outbreak of the Coto War, President Belisario Porras Barahona appointed him head of the army which was made up of police officers and volunteers. His mission was to repel the forces of Costa Rica. Once the war was over, he was named the "Hero de Coto". During the war however, he was involved in an incident where one of the men he conscripted known as Segundo Gonzales had stabbed James Denham, killing him in the process and Quintero Villarreal discussed with the Surveyor of Panama, Francisco Moreira. Quintero Villarreal then ran as the presidential candidate of the Porrista Liberal Party during the 1924 Panamanian general election, against Rodolfo Chiari but only gained 14 percent of the vote.

After his death on February 22, 1954, his sword was found buried near the San Pablo Nuevo Museum, Chiriquí Province in 2005.
