= Carlos Albán =

Colombian inventor who specialized in mathematics, chemistry, medicine, and surgery

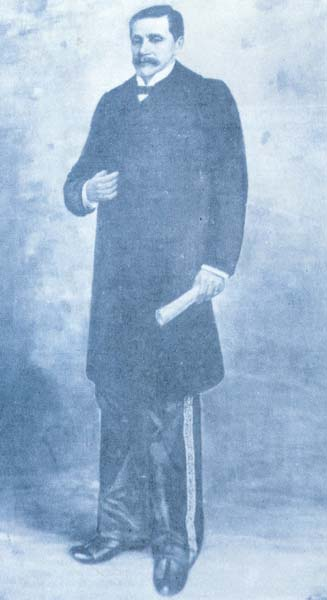
- Albán in 1899
- Born: April 9, 1844; Popayán, Republic of New Granada
- Died: January 20, 1902 (aged 57); Sea of Panama
- Cause of death: Sinking of his ship
- Education: University of Cauca
- Occupations: Scientific inventor; surgeon; politician; philosopher; journalist; lawyer
- Known for: Zeppelin; Universal Time Clock; trifocal light mirror; pneumo-barometer

Carlos Albán (March 9, 1844 – January 20, 1902) was a Colombian inventor who specialized in mathematics, chemistry, medicine, and surgery. Albán also practiced as a political philosopher, journalist, and lawyer.

== Early life and education ==
Carlos Albán was born in Popayán, Colombia, the capital of the department of Cauca. Albán studied at the University of Cauca. In 1869, he was awarded a Doctor of Medicine and Surgery degree, and two years later, in 1871, he earned a doctorate of Law and Political Science, for which he wrote a thesis on the "Constitution of 1863". This thesis declared that the Colombian people could no longer be governed by liberalism, including the Constitution and its laws.

== Career ==
=== Journalism ===
After returning from battle in 1865, Albán set about reorganizing the Conservative Party which had virtually disappeared. To achieve this, he founded Los Principios, a newspaper in Cali, in 1870. The newspaper called for political activism and denounced the state of social disorder, which had resulted from the Rionegro and Cauca Constitutions. He believed that there existed a "carte blanche for violence," that the regime of individual liberty had degenerated in favor of the liberal mindset, and that many conservatives "had abandoned the main focus." In 1871, the paper had to be closed due to distribution problems.

Later that year, Albán founded the Principios Político-Religiosos (the Politico-Religious Principles) newspaper in Popayan, with assistance from Fernando Angulo and Sergio Arboleda, with whom he reorganized the Conservative Party. The newspaper was forced to close after the first term, because the liberals warned that conservative reorganization would lead to war. It reopened in 1873 under the management of Manuel Carvajal Valencia and with the collaboration of Albán, who was also writing in El Tradicionista (the Traditionist) and other conservative newspapers in Bogotá.

=== Political activism ===
Albán began participating in political activities as a youth. In 1865, while still a student, he fought in the Battle of Santa Barbara in defense of the liberal government of the Sovereign State of Cauca, which faced a conservative revolution. His most active years were 1875-76 when he took advantage of the division of the liberal camp among radicals and independents and began to work on creating a "Catholic Party". Persons who "support Catholicism with all its consequences, and without restrictions of any kind, regardless of what may happen and also the political party to which they belong" were invited to join.

His journalism expressed the importance of Catholicism as an element of political cohesion. He had noted that the clergy, especially Carlos Bermudez, Bishop of Popayan and Manuel Canuto Restrepo, Bishop of Pasto, were important agitators. A huge image of the Virgin of Lourdes in Cauca was used in processions for political purposes. They formed various Catholic Societies, such as the society of St. Vincent de Paul, Sacred Heart and others.

Despite advances in building the party, the political conditions in Cauca led to the project being abandoned. Albán led the conservatives into the 1876 Civil war. Although the war bore characteristics of a religious war, they were not enough to ensure Conservative victory. The failure of the military adventure led to the expulsion of the clergy and the main conservatives, but more importantly, Albán's work enabled conservatism to survive as a party, despite liberal reprisals. It was able to help the liberals in the War of 1885, enabling the political period known as the Regeneration and with it Conservative Hegemony.

=== Government service ===
From 1886 on, he was a prominent government figure both nationally and in the State of Cauca, occupying offices such as the Centre Court judge, State Attorney General and Solicitor General of la Nación. Politically, he aligned himself with the conservative faction known as Los Históricos, through which he aroused opposition to the Miguel Antonio Caro and Carlos Holguin governments. In 1891 Holguin enforced the so-called Law of Horses (Act 61 of 1888) and confined Albán to Cauca.

=== Military career ===
Albán participated in the 1895 war to defend his party's hegemony. In 1899, he participated in the War of a Thousand Days. He was appointed civil and military chief in Panama, canceling a move to Europe where he was to take up the position of Consulate in Hamburg, in order to

In 1900 he won the Battle of Calidonia Bridge with general Emiliano Herrera during the War of a Thousand Days. Alban died during a naval battle in Panama on January 20, 1902, when the ship he commanded, "Lautaro", was sunk.

=== Work in science ===
Albán conducted research in the fields of Physics, Mathematics and Chemistry, areas that were poorly developed in Colombia. He tried to obtain investment to apply to industry.

==== Chemistry ====
He tried to make lead lenses for distilling sulfuric acid, a key manufacturing ingredient. His efforts enabled him to create carbon disulphide, rubber's only solvent. In 1872, his research on the precipitation of metals led him to draw analogies between the forms of the precipitates and certain vegetable forms, and to propose a new classification of metals that were not based on affinity to oxygen but in the laws governing "the formation of absorbency in precipitates."

==== Physics ====
He studied the reflection of light and invented a "trifocal light mirror."

He invented an apparatus for producing a vacuum without the need for a "pneumo-barometer" machine. This was very successful in Paris and was recommended in scientific journals.

His other inventions were a clock marking World Time, a device that allowed lifting any weight that was patented in the United States and an invention called Double Ludion which was patented in Brussels.

=== Airship ===
His most important invention was "a system of metal casing Balloon", the patent was requested in 1887 from the Ministry of Industry some years preceding the construction of the airship. He wrote:

Development Minister Carlos Alban, Colombia, Popayán neighbor, you respectfully say: I found that the fabric cover that is currently used to line the balloon can be substituted with great advantage by wrapping thin iron steel, aluminum or other malleable metal or league, no one before me has had such an idea or has used such covers for balloons. With a kilogram of metal can form a sheet of one square meter, and six hundred square meters of these sheets can form a cube of ten feet on each side of each of its six faces: a bucket of this surface has a thousand cubic feet of capacity and filled with hydrogen, can lift 1,300 kg, it is known that each cubic meter of gas up 1 K, 300, then subtract a lifting force of 700 kilograms, enough to meet all the conditions must have a balloon and to double the cover weight. To apply this calculation to the area and any other form given to the balloon, no proof is needed. As such, in accordance with applicable law, request the Executive Branch exclusive privilege to exploit my discovery for the legal term, and accompanied the respective receipt of the Treasury, as well as a balloon drawing metal cover.

Popayan, January 21, 1887. Carlos Alban.

Ministry. Bogotá, February 18, 1887. Be published this application and the receipt of Mr. Deputy Treasurer in the Official Gazette and require the interested fill out the formalities referred to in articles 5th. and 13 of Act 35 of 1869, to obtain the patent is requested. The Minister, J. Red Houses.

Gen. Rafael Reyes, as Minister, granted patent # 58 with a term of 20 years on October 9, 1888.

=== Other inventions ===
Other inventions by Alban were patented in Colombia, Germany, Italy, France and United States. The Evening Star noted:

"Powerful telescope. -If any scientific reader is placed in a completely flat visual discovered and puts on an object placed at a mile away, clearly distinguishable not only their outlines but minutiae of it. If then the moon would appeal to an apparent distance of a mile of land, which field is open to prospective scientific discoveries! This probability, or rather certainty of discovery, is a distinguished and powerful gentleman in Colombia, South America, it is believed able to bring to fruition, and if success crowns his efforts, there will be universal in the fair reflective telescope such power, that all known until now seem little more than simple binoculars. Mr. Carlos Alban, Colombia, is the sorcerer who attempts to produce these wonders, who is currently in Washington conferring with scientists and officials on how best to proceed. Dr. Alban has been attorney general of Colombia and is known as a remarkable scientific man. His plan embraces the principle of telescope reflective glass with several radical changes in old methods. Use a new procedure, first to the crystals themselves and adjusting the focus. So instead of moving the part of the eye, as currently practiced, move the lens itself for convenient adjustment. Dr. Alban has built an instrument of twenty-five inches in diameter, which has been shown in New York City and has shown great power. An apparatus for four yards in diameter, weighs only 200 pounds, and unless the eminent inventor has committed serious miscalculation, have such great power that will attract the moon at a distance of a mile from the land and will definitively resolve the question of structure and the possibility of life in that luminary. A recent article in the "Courrier des Etats Unis" makes such a relationship of a telescope is planned for the exhibition building of Paris in 1900. Important to know that Dr. Alban developed his plan before he thought of the French unit and if success crowns his efforts, the honor of this great advance in astronomy belong to the American continent, whereas the United States will be the field of practice development and action."

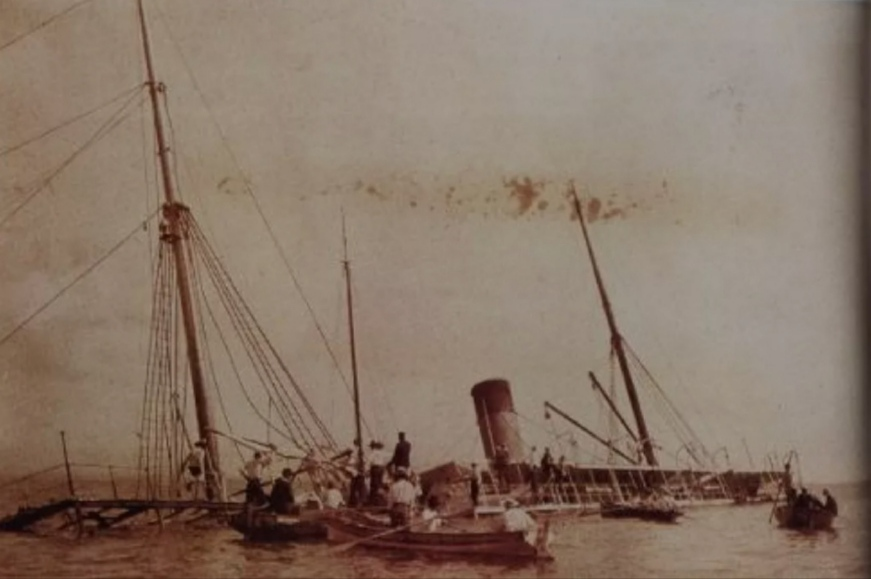
Sinking the ship Lautaro at Panama, led by Carlos Albán, who died in action (1902).

=== Author ===
Religious fervor transcended all aspects of his life, but were mainly reflected in his poetry and prose. He began publishing in 1884. In 1898, he sent the sum of fifty gold francs to the Societe Centrale de Paris which they had paid for the sale of a scientific apparatus. This amount was earmarked for a Mass at the altar of Our Lady of Lourdes.

=== Lecturer ===
His reputation was not confined to the small-town areas of Popayán. His contemporaries claimed that he was praised in the European press and that he received awards in the Brussels Expo. His travels through Europe allowed him to present lectures in Cali on the convenience of acetylene gas lighting and on taking advantage of the force of the Cauca river: "All that power is lost, he said, and all that force in the industry is wealth (...) I will study hydraulics to prove to engineers that science can take advantage of this treasure in our rivers ".

Like most Cauca politicians, Carlos was also devoted to teaching in the University of Cauca where he was known as "El Loco". There he held several positions in the faculties of Arts and Science. He also taught at the College of Mary, for girls, and founded the San Pedro, for men, where he applied the method later called active living school.

== Bibliography ==
- Vernaza, José Ignacio (1948). Carlos Alban (Print. Departmental ed.). Colombia.
- GROVE, GUSTAVO. Genealogical and Biographical Dictionary of the former department of Cauca. Bogota: Library Horizons, 1962.
- VERNAZA, JOSE IGNACIO. Doctor Carlos Alban. Cali: Printing Department, 1948.
- VELASCO AND CASTILLO, JOSE MARIA. Homage to the city of Popayan to the memory of Dr. Carlos Alban. Popayán: 1902.
