= Battle of Calidonia Bridge =

Battle during the Thousand Days' War

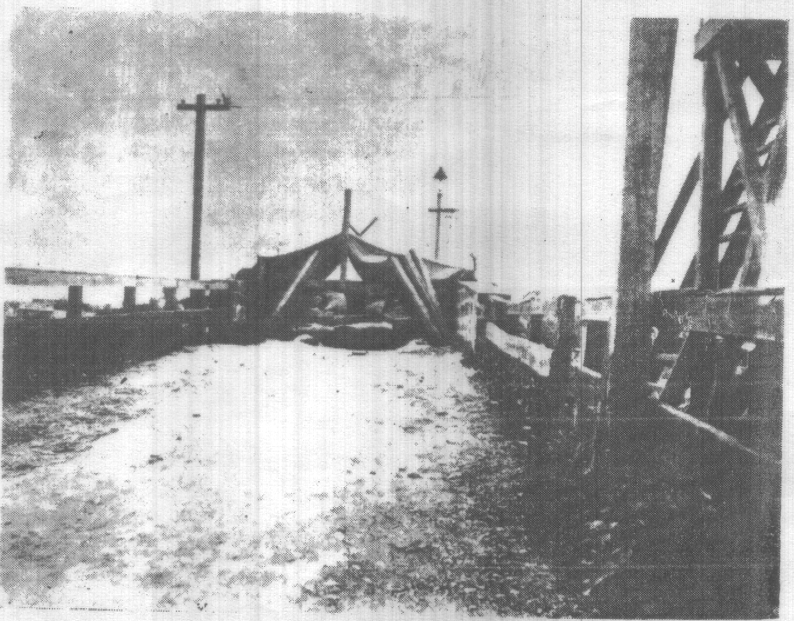
Date	July 24-26, 1900
Location	Calidonia, Panama City

The Battle of Calidonia Bridge (Spanish: Batalla del Puente de Calidonia) took place from 24 to 26 July 1900 in Calidonia, Panama, within the context of the Thousand Days' War. It ended with a bloody defeat at the hands of the conservatives. It followed the Battle of Corozal on 21 June 1900, where the liberal forces won an important victory over the Conservative army under General Carlos Albán, who had no choice but to retreat to the city of Panama. After the victory, the liberal army, under General Emiliano Herrera, aimed to capture the remaining bastion of conservative forces in the isthmus. Instead of making a final attack, Herrera initially offered his surrender to Albán, who refused. This hesitation on the part of Herrera gave time to Albán and his men to prepare their defenses. Trenches were built, protecting themselves with steel rails, and closed the entrance to the city. Thus, the conservative units were well entrenched.

The battle began on 24 July 1900, with the advance of about 1,000 men of the liberal army to conservative positions. The attack was extremely messy, coupled with the disadvantage of fighting against a well-prepared enemy, the result could be little more than a slaughter. On 25 July, Belisario Porras made arrangements for a new attack on the city, but reconsidered his position to announce the arrival of General Campo Serrano and 1,250 men to reinforce the conservative position in the city, and the arrival of the vessel Boyaca. Finally, liberals surrendered on the 26 July. It is estimated that the liberals lost about 700 men (the largest number of casualties during the war), while conservative army losses are estimated at 98 men.
