= Battle of Peralonso =

1899 military action in Colombia

- Part of the Santander Campaign of the Thousand Days' War
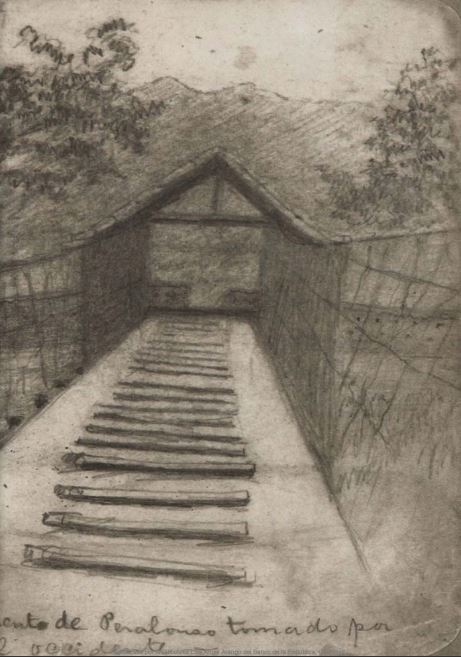
- Sketch of La Laja Bridge, across which Rafael Uribe Uribe charged, by rebel colonel Peregrino Rivera Arce, 1900
Date	15–16 December 1899
Location	Peralonso River, modern-day Norte de Santander, Colombia
Result	Liberal victory

Belligerents
Colombian government Conservatives	Liberal rebels

Commanders and leaders
Vicente Villamizar; Jorge Holguín; Ramón González Valencia	Rafael Uribe Uribe (WIA); Benjamín Herrera (WIA); Justo L. Durán; Gabriel Vargas Santos

Strength
5,610	4,000

Casualties and losses
700 killed and wounded 900 captured 2,000 deserted	750 killed and wounded

The Battle of Peralonso (Spanish: Batalla de Peralonso), also known as the Battle of La Amarilla or the Battle of La Laja, was a major battle in the Santander Campaign of the Thousand Days' War in Colombia. It was fought between the Conservative government and the Liberal rebels between 15 and 16 December 1899, ending in an important Liberal victory. The Liberal rebels had suffered a series of major defeats culminating in the failed attack on Bucaramanga on 13 November. Afterward, the Liberal forces splintered into three autonomous forces, led by Rafael Uribe Uribe, Benjamín Herrera, and Justo L. Durán, but they first regrouped in Cúcuta. The autonomous rebel armies shifted to new positions on and around the heights of Cerro Tasajero, north of Cúcuta and close to the border with Venezuela.

The Conservative forces delayed in pressuring the Liberals, partially due to controversy when Minister of War José Santos appointed Vicente Villamizar supreme commander of the Conservative army instead of the more popular Manuel Casabianca. The Liberal forces secretly decamped from Cerro Tasajero on 13 December once the Conservative army appeared. They successfully took the rail line north to La Arenosa and attempted a circuitous march west, across the Zulia River, with the objective of evading the Conservative forces and probing deeper into Santander (modern-day Norte de Santander). Late on the night of the 13th, Villamizar ordered Ramón González Valencia, commander of III Division, to detain the fleeing rebels, promising that V Division under Jesús Zuluaga would reinforce shortly thereafter.

Troops of III Division encountered Liberal forces at the Peralonso River, a tributary of the Zulia, early the morning of 15 December. Intense skirmishing broke out over La Laja Bridge, a narrow structure that provided the only viable passageway across the Peralonso. Although III Division managed to hold off repeated rebel attempts to force a crossing, on 16 December the Conservative forces panicked and the entire army routed. There is debate over why the Conservatives fled, but most sources agree that Uribe personally led a charge across La Laja Bridge that triggered the rout.

The Liberal triumph at the Battle of Peralonso gave the rebellion much-needed momentum, improving morale and logistics thanks to the large quantity of materiel captured from the fleeing Conservatives. The rebels also reclaimed Cúcuta after the government forces abandoned the city. In the aftermath of their triumph, Uribe and Herrera agreed to name Gabriel Vargas Santos the Supreme Director of the War for the Liberal side, as well as the Provisional President of Colombia, in a direct challenge to Manuel Antonio Sanclemente's Conservative administration. Vargas Santos, however, failed to capitalize on the momentum of the Liberal victory at Peralonso and mostly delayed any further action in the Santander Campaign until the Battle of Palonegro in May 1900.

== Background ==
The Santander Campaign was the first major campaign of the Thousand Days' War, fought in what are today the departments of Santander and Norte de Santander. After the Liberal defeat at the Battle of Bucaramanga on 13 November, Rafael Uribe Uribe withdrew his forces, hoping to make it to Cúcuta. This city was held by Benjamín Herrera's army and close to the Venezuelan border, where the rebels hoped to receive military and economic support from Cipriano Castro. The Conservative government’s response to the victory at Bucaramanga was sluggish; it waited almost a month before it made any serious attempt to pressure the rebels. Conservative general Ramón González Valencia was initially authorized by his superior, Vicente Villamizar, to pursue Uribe’s forces and rout them before they could join up with Herrera’s forces. Villamizar countermanded this order shortly after 27 November, however, ordering González to await the arrival of General Isaías Luján’s I and II Divisions.

This delay allowed Uribe to arrive safely in Cúcuta and link up not only with Herrera, but also General Justo L. Durán, who had raised his own autonomous rebel army. When the Conservative army, numbering 8,000 soldiers, advanced on Cúcuta, it compelled the Liberals to withdraw. The Liberal retreat fragmented the rebel army, splitting it once again into the three autonomous armies commanded by Uribe, Herrera, and Durán. They converged around Cerro Tasajero, a strategic hill protected by the Táchira River and the Venezuelan border to the west, and the Aguablanca rail line linking Cúcuta to Puerto Villamizar. Herrera camped west of the Aguablanca line, Uribe camped on the heights, and Durán camped on the Venezuelan border, where they awaited the Conservatives’ next move.

== Dispute over Conservative command ==
The Conservative attack was delayed considerably by internal disputes over command of the army. President Manuel Antonio Sanclemente intended to promote General Manuel Casabianca to commander of the Northeastern Theater of Operations. Minister of War José Santos, a Conservative and rival to Sanclemente’s Nationalist Conservative cabinet, instead appointed Villamizar to the post on 22 November.

Several Conservative generals, including Ramón González Valencia, protested and sent Casabianca a telegram informing him that they awaited his arrival so that they could recognize him as commander of the Northeastern Theater. Upon Casabianca’s arrival, however, he realized that Bogotá had not granted him the position and opted to return to his original posting on the Atlantic coast in order to avoid a potential revolt within the Conservative ranks. This left Villamizar in charge, per Santos’s decision, making him the Generalísimo of the Army of the Northeast.

== Order of battle ==
=== Colombian government ===
The Colombian government's order of battle was as follows:

I Division

- Bárbula Battalion
- Nariño Battalion
- Boyacá Battalion

II Division

- Sucre Battalion
- Granaderos Battalion
- Holguín Battalion
- Vencedores Battalion
- Tiradores de Gámbita Battalion

III Division

- Mutiscua Battalion
- Pamplona Battalion
- Chinácota Battalion
- Cúcuta Battalion
- Gramalote Battalion
- Arboledas Battalion
- Salazar Battalion

IV Division

- Medellín Battalion
- Vencedores Battalion
- Briceño Battalion
- Herrán Battalion
- Julio Arboleda Battalion

V Division

- First Cauca Battalion
- Eleventh Cauca Battalion
- Thirteenth Cauca Battalion

VI Division

- Córdoba Battalion
- Tiradores Battalion
- Tenerife Battalion

=== Liberals ===
The Liberal order of battle was as follows:

Autonomous Revolutionary Army of Rafael Uribe Uribe

- Libres de Bogotá Cavalry Squadron
- Vargas Santos Cavalry Squadron
- Villar Battalion
- Maceo Battalion
- Vélez Battalion
- Vargas Santos Battalion
- First Bogotá Battalion
- Colombia Battalion
- Volitgeros Battalion

Autonomous Revolutionary Army of Benjamín Herrera

- 14 battalions (numbered 1-14)

Autonomous Revolutionary Army of Justo L. Durán

- Carmen de Santander Battalion
- Cazadores Battalion
- Córdoba Battalion
- La Palma Battalion
- Libres de Puerto Santos Battalion
- Libres de Ocaña Battalion

== Battle ==
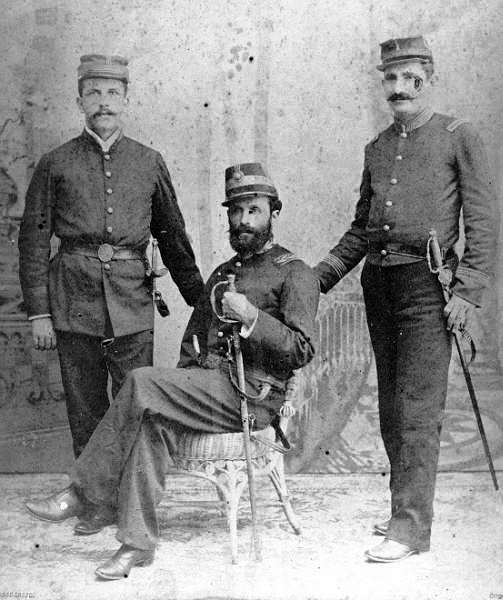
General Ramón González Valencia.

While the Conservative leadership disputed command of the Northeastern Theater, the autonomous Liberal armies awaited their opponent’s move from their positions in and around Cerro Tasajero, a hill on the border with Venezuela. Although those positions were defendable, the Liberals lacked the munitions to hold the hill against a concentrated assault. The two sides exchanged messages and attempted to initiate negotiations. These proved unfruitful, however, and on the night of 13 December, the rebels secretly abandoned Cerro Tasajero, leaving behind a token force to continue burning campfires so that the government forces would not discover their movement until daybreak.

The Liberals hoped to cross the Zulia River west of Cúcuta and escape the Conservative forces. The rebels crossed the Zulia at a tributary, the Peralonso River. Although the Peralonso was shallow enough for the soldiers to wade across, rain had swollen the water, forcing them to cross at La Laja Bridge, a small suspension bridge that spanned the river. The rain stopped on the night of 14 December. Conservative advance forces under González caught up to the Liberals at the Peralonso on the morning of 15 December, and both sides dug trenches on either side of the river. The Liberals occupied the western bank of the river, and the Conservatives occupied the eastern bank. The two lines of battle stretched from Amarilla to the north to Caimito in the south.

The two armies exchanged fire ineffectively over the course of the day, with Villamizar apparently unwilling to commit his reserves. González’s vanguard was undersupplied and exhausted. However, the Conservative positions were more favorable, since they could take shelter behind a stone fence and fire through slits across the river. As a result, the Liberals were unable to push the government forces back and sustained heavy losses trying to take La Laja Bridge. Conservative reinforcements arrived that night. However, these trickled in only periodically, since the Conservative line was stretched more than seven leagues, with Villamizar’s headquarters established at the far end of this line. Further complicating the Conservative situation, Villamizar was only issuing his orders verbally.

On the morning of 16 December, the Conservative forces attempted to force a crossing south of La Laja Bridge at another bridge at Caimito. This attack failed, and by 9:00 a.m. the main force of the Conservative army had arrived to reinforce the advance forces. This gave the government forces a significant advantage and allowed them to slowly push the Liberals back, wounding Herrera in the leg in the process. At 12:00 p.m., a government battalion waded across the Peralonso at Amarilla and managed to advance on the Liberal headquarters at La Zulita. However, Villamizar ordered this battalion to return to its position on the Conservative flank, abandoning the attack.

The decisive moment came at 4:30 p.m., when Uribe and a small group of between 10 and 14 men charged across La Laja Bridge on foot. The Conservative defenders failed to inflict any losses on Uribe's party, only managing to wound Uribe himself in the leg, and when the Liberal party had crossed the bridge, the Conservatives abandoned their position. With the Conservative flank vulnerable, more rebels advanced across La Laja Bridge and started to push into the Conservative line.

In a moment of confusion, the Conservative command signaled a withdrawal on the bugles that transformed into a massive rout. Panic spread throughout the Conservative ranks as the government soldiers dropped their weapons and abandoned their positions on the battlefield. The Liberal forces drove their enemy from the field, ending the pursuit at nightfall, where they returned to recover the weapons, munitions, and other materials that the Conservatives had left where they fled. The battle had ended with a Liberal victory.

== Controversy over Uribe's charge ==
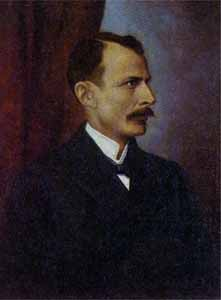
Portrait of Rafael Uribe Uribe by Francisco Antonio Cano.

After the battle of Peralonso, both Liberal and Conservative commanders disputed the reason for the Conservative collapse in the face of Uribe’s charge across La Laja Bridge. For the Liberal commanders, at stake was personal reputation and credit for victory. Durán and Herrera disputed the claim that Uribe was responsible for victory at Peralonso. In his memoirs, Durán referenced a January 1900 publication by a group of Liberal officers, including three who claimed to have accompanied Uribe on his charge. The authors claimed that the Conservative army had already begun its withdrawal before Uribe’s charge. Colombian historian Jorge Martínez Landínez has argued that Herrera’s tactical ability in directing the fighting before he was wounded created the conditions for Uribe’s charge to succeed.

The Conservatives, meanwhile, argued over who was responsible for the defeat at Peralonso. Most of the blame fell on Villamizar for his conduct as commander of the army. Some sources claimed that Uribe’s charge across La Laja Bridge succeeded only because the Minister of War, José Santos, had sent Villamizar a telegram ordering him to cede the field to the rebels. The telegram allegedly read: “Discrete and urgent. –Generalissimo Villamizar. –El Salado or wherever you are. –Remain on the defensive. Retreat to Pamplona. Allow the revolution to advance. Government needs to prolong state of affairs. Circulate the message that our cause must be saved. Destroy this. Signed, José Santos.” However, there is no documentary evidence for the telegram’s existence outside of secondary literature written by historians. The earliest written source referencing this claim is Leonidas Flórez Álvarez’s 1938 book Campaña en Santander (Campaign in Santander).

Historians largely discredit the telegram as unfounded. Martínez argues that a contagious panic seized the Conservative soldiers at La Laja and this spread, uncontained, across the whole army. René de la Pedraja explains the Conservative defeat as the result of the government soldiers at La Laja having “collapsed behind the walls because without food or reinforcements and with little water, they were exhausted by two days of nearly continuous fighting.” Rafael Pardo Rueda suggests that Valencia mistakenly believed Uribe’s charge to be much bigger than it really was, and consequently ordered the withdrawal because he thought the Liberal army had seized the initiative.

== Aftermath ==
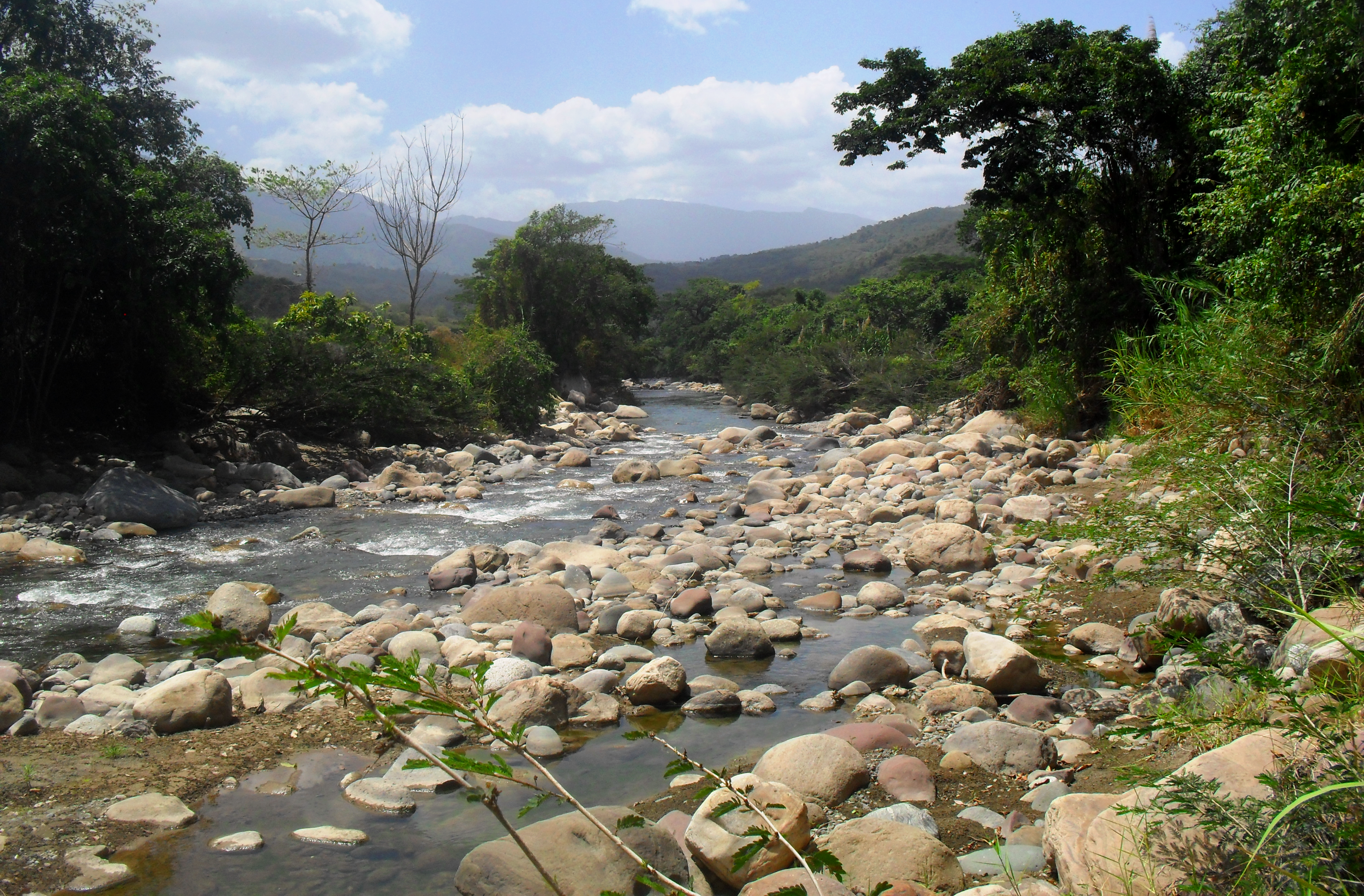
The Peralonso River in 2013.

The battle of Peralonso was one of the most important Liberal victories in the Thousand Days' War. It gave the rebels much-needed ammunition that the Conservatives abandoned on the battlefield as they fled. It reversed a string of near-constant losses that they had suffered since the start of the war two months earlier, and it elevated Uribe to celebrity status within the Liberal ranks. The Liberals claimed afterwards that a lunar eclipse on 16 December, visible from the battlefield, signaled their imminent victory.

However, the Liberals did not capitalize on the victory at Peralonso. After Uribe’s popularity increased as a result of his charge across La Laja Bridge, Herrera and other Liberal generals conspired to limit his influence. Herrera and Uribe, in particular, had long considered each other rivals and had mutual disdain for the other. In order to curb his rise to power, on 25 December they named Gabriel Vargas Santos to serve as the rebels’ provisional president of the Republic of Colombia. Vargas did not pursue the defeated Conservatives; instead, he garrisoned his army in Bucaramanga for three weeks, before moving to Cúcuta. His inaction did nothing to help a pro-Liberal insurrection in Antioquia which began on 1 January 1900, inspired by the victory at Peralonso. The revolt in Antioquia was crushed within a matter of weeks.

Meanwhile, the Conservative leadership was thrown into disarray by its defeat at Peralonso. In January 1900, Sanclemente replaced Villamizar with Casabianca, the general that the president had initially intended to serve as the commander of the Northeastern Theater. Casabianca organized the dispersed Conservative forces and positioned them on the Chicamocha River, south of Bucaramanga and north of Sogamoso. This was Casabianca’s intended defensive line should the Liberals advance on Bogotá.

In the weeks after Peralonso, the Liberal armies won victories at Gramalote and Terán in February 1900, but mostly remained inactive. They camped in and around Cúcuta until April. It would not be until May that they seriously attempted to push into the interior of Colombia and threaten Bogotá. The Conservative army, by now under the command of Próspero Pinzón (Casabianca had been promoted to Minister of War after Sanclemente fired Santos on 2 May), intercepted and defeated the Liberals at Palonegro.
