= Anzola =

Anzola may refer to:

- Anzola dell'Emilia, municipality in the Metropolitan City of Bologna in the Italian region Emilia-Romagna
- Anzola d'Ossola, municipality in the Province of Verbano-Cusio-Ossola in the Italian region Piedmont
- Anzola (surname), surname
