= Battle of San Cristóbal =

1901 battle of the Thousand Day's War in Venezuela

- Part of Thousand Days' War
Date	28–29 July 1901
Location	San Cristóbal, Venezuela
Result	victory of the Venezuelans and Colombian Liberals

Belligerents
United States of Venezuela; Colombian Liberal Party	Republic of Colombia; Conservatives

The Battle of San Cristóbal (Spanish: Batalla de San Cristóbal) was a battle of the Thousand Days' War. Colombian troops besieged San Cristóbal (Venezuela) and took the city between 28 and 29 July 1901.
