= 1924 Panamanian general election =

General elections were held in Panama on 2 September 1924 to elect both a new President of the Republic and a new National Assembly.

The American government remained aloof and permitted Panamanians to manage their own affairs. Rodolfo Chiari, the Liberal candidate, defeated General Manuel Quintero Villarreal, the commander of the Panamanian army at Coto and the leader of the opposition, for the presidency in an election of ‘orden perfecto’.

One practice that grew out of the struggle for control of the electoral board was the ‘paquetazo,’ which amounted to stuffing the ballot boxes with ghost votes, thereby giving the party that controlled the board a landslide victory in a particularly difficult to monitor, remote part of the country. One of the more blatant cases occurred in 1924. Rodolfo Chiari, the administration’s hand-picked candidate, easily won the 1924 election, including a landslide margin among the indigenous people of San Blas. There police intimidation resulted in a margin of 594 to 17 in favor of Chiari.

== Results ==
=== President ===
Candidate	Party	Votes	%
Rodolfo Chiari	Chiarista Liberal Party–Conservative Party	28,376	85.78
Manuel Quintero Villarreal	Porrista Liberal Party	4,705	14.22
Total		33,081	100.00
Source: Escritas Históricos de Panamá

=== National Assembly ===
Party	Seats
Liberal Party	38
Conservative Party	8
Total	46
Source: Political Handbook of the World
