= Marco Tulio Anzola Samper =

Colombian lawyer and author

Marco Tulio Anzola Samper (born 1892) was a Colombian lawyer and writer. Following the assassination of General Rafael Uribe Uribe in October 1914, Anzola Samper was asked by Julián Uribe Uribe and Carlos Adolfo Urueta, respectively the brother and the son-in-law of the deceased politician, to investigate the matter. After three years of investigation, Anzola Samper published the controversial book Asesinato del general Uribe Uribe. ¿Quiénes son?, in which he accused the Colombian political establishment of conspiracy and cover-up. He was publicly denounced and was eventually forced to emigrate to the United States. His later fate is unknown.

The assassination and Anzola Samper's investigation form a major theme of Juan Gabriel Vasquez's novel La forma de las Ruinas.
