= Coto Colorado River =

River in Costa Rica

- Location of mouth

Location
- Country: Costa Rica

Physical characteristics
- Mouth
  - coordinates: 8°32′55″N 83°08′20″W

Coto Colorado River is a river of Costa Rica that is located on the Pacific Ocean coast.
