= Rafael Uribe Uribe =

Colombian lawyer, journalist and general

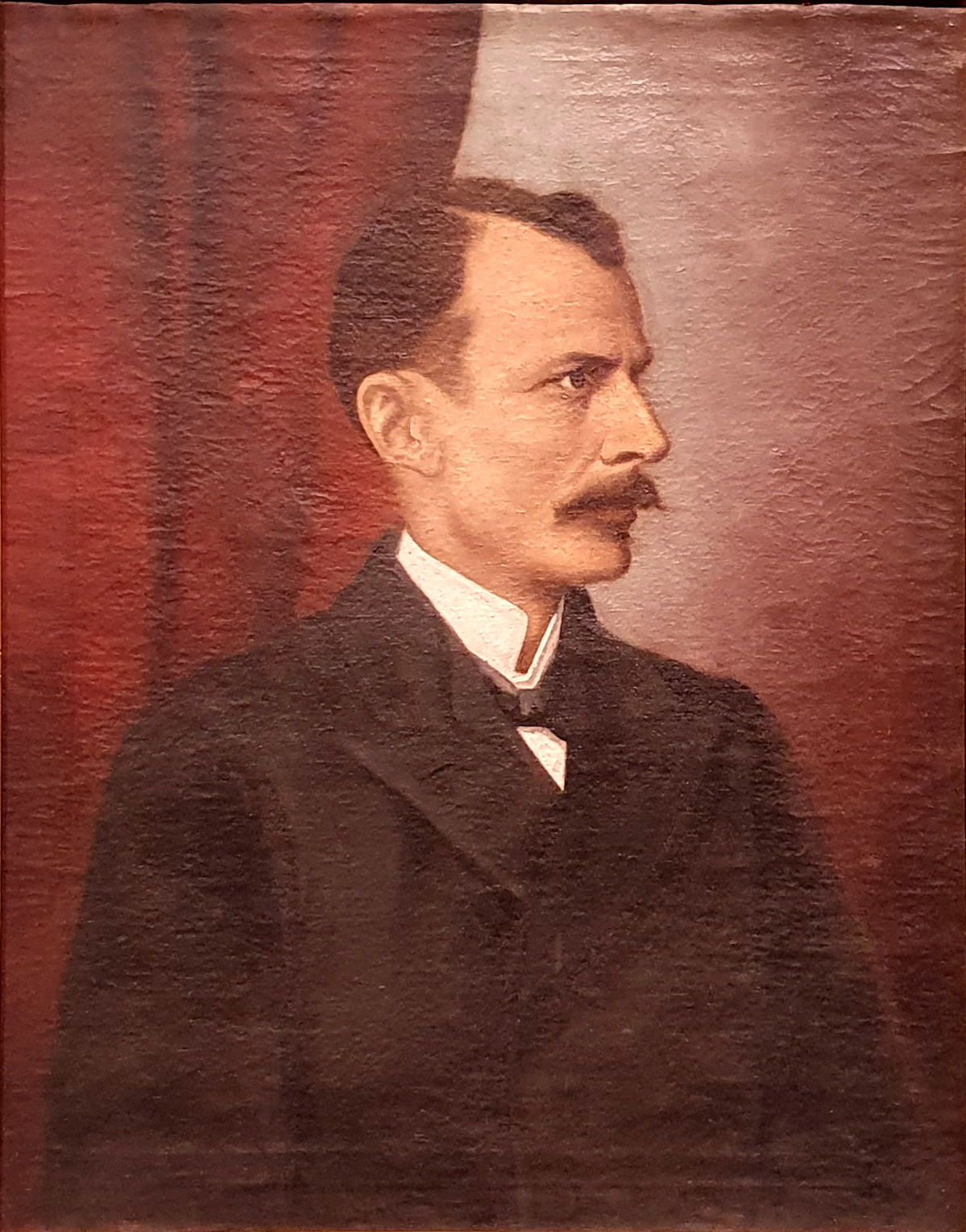
- Painting of Rafael Uribe by Francisco Antonio Cano

4th Envoy Extraordinary and Minister Plenipotentiary of Colombia to Brazil
- In office January 1906 – 7 September 1907
- President: Rafael Reyes Prieto
- Preceded by: Antonio José Uribe Gaviria
- Succeeded by: Luis Tanco Argáez

Personal details
- Born: Rafael Victor Zenón Uribe Uribe; 12 April 1859 Valparaíso, Antioquia, Granadine Confederation
- Died: 15 October 1914 (aged 55) Bogotá, D.C., Colombia
- Resting place: Central Cemetery of Bogotá
- Party: Liberal
- Spouse: Sixta Tulia Gaviria Sañudo (1886–1914)
- Children: María Luisa Uribe Gaviria; Adelaida Uribe Gaviria; Julián Uribe Gaviria; Tulia Uribe Gaviria; Inés Uribe Gaviria; Carlos Uribe Gaviria
- Education: Our Lady of the Rosary University (LLB, 1880)
- Profession: Lawyer

Rafael Victor Zenón Uribe Uribe (12 April 1859 – 15 October 1914) was a Colombian lawyer, journalist, and general in the liberal party rebel army.

Uribe Uribe is best known for his political ideas in favor of the establishment of Guild socialism and trade unions in Colombia, his diplomatic work and his support of Colombian coffee growers in fighting diseases such as rust. One of his greatest contributions was, along with Benjamin Herrera, the founding of the Republican University that later became the Free University of Colombia. The Rafael Uribe Uribe Palace of Culture in Medellín is named after him.

== Early years ==
Uribe was born in the small town of Valparaíso, in the Sovereign State of Antioquia (now the Department of Antioquia) at his family's country estate of El Palmar on 12 April 1859. His mother educated him at home and he was reportedly a shy boy. In 1871, Uribe was accepted to the University of Antioquia, then attended a military school called School of the State, where he received martial training. He also studied sporadically in Buga, Capital of the Sovereign State of Cauca (Present day Department of Valle del Cauca) where he also joined the Liberal rebels of Cauca during the Colombian Civil War of 1876 and was wounded in combat.

In 1880, Uribe graduated from Our Lady of the Rosary University as a lawyer and the next year worked as Attorney General of Antioquia. He also became a Professor in constitutional law and political economy. In 1885, Uribe participated in another civil war, in which he was involved in the execution of a subordinate for disobedience. However, the Conservatives in power absolved him.

== Thousand days war ==
In 1895, Uribe Uribe participated in the Civil War (1895), but was defeated in the Battle of La Tribuna by General Rafael Reyes. Uribe escaped through the Magdalena River and was later captured in the town of Santa Cruz de Mompox. He was imprisoned in the Cárcel de San Diego, Cartagena de Indias.

After being granted a pardon, Uribe became a Deputy to the Chamber of Representative in which he became a critic of the Regeneration. The Regeneration advocated for centralism, the restriction of civil liberties and an established accord with the Roman Catholic Church. The main promoters of this movement were President Rafael Nuñez (1880–1888) and Miguel Antonio Caro (1892–1898).

During these years Uribe also founded a newspaper called El Autonomista ("The Autonomist") managing a publicity campaign against the conservative government and attacked members of his own party, most notably Aquileo Parra. Due to these printings, Uribe gained significant prominence in Liberal Party, participating also in the uprising of 20 October 1899 which triggered the Thousand Days War.

=== Santander campaign ===
During the Santander military campaign between October 1899 and August 1900, Uribe commanded the liberal forces in the Battle of Bucaramanga (13-14 November 1899), where he was defeated. He then organized a retreat to the city of Cúcuta, where he joined forces with Liberal general Benjamín Herrera.

On 15 December 1899, while en route to Ocaña his troops were ambushed at a location known as La Amarilla initiating the Battle of Peralonso. The battle ended the next day with the victory of Uribe over the conservatives. Uribe had attacked the bridge over the Peralonso River. For this action he was deemed the "Hero of Peralonso". Documents left by the retreating army later showed that its commander Vicente Villamizar had orders to let the liberal army pass to prolong the war and to give the government an excuse to confiscate property and issue more paper money. Moreover, before starting the battle, the government army provided the rebels with two mules loaded with ammunition, of which the liberals had little.

=== Capture of Conservative Higher Command ===
On 2 February 1900, Uribe Uribe's troops captured the Conservative Higher Command in a Hacienda named Teran. Between 11 May and 15 May 1900, he fought in the Battle of Palonegro, commanding his own division. The conservatives led by Próspero Pinzón won the battle and Uribe crossed the border to Venezuela. Conservative troops under the command of general Rangel Garbiras managed to invade Venezuela and cut the aid of Cipriano Castro government to the Liberals but were defeated by general Uribe in the battle of San Cristobal (29 July 1901).

Between 1901 and 1902, he alternated military activities with peace initiatives which were not taken into account by the then conservative government of José Manuel Marroquín. General Uribe saw that the Liberals would not be able to defeat the Conservatives, and therefore was inclined to surrender, albeit with certain conditions. On 12 June 1902, the government offered amnesty, and the liberal rebels began to demobilize. Uribe surrendered in the Hacienda Neerlandia on 24 October 1902. He began issuing pamphlets promoting the conservative government, and soon took a lower public profile.

== Death ==
Rafael Uribe Uribe died on 15 October 1914, aged 55, after he was attacked with axes the day before by two workers named Jesús Carvajal and Leovigildo Galarza. Local authorities believed it to be an act of terrorism, but those suspicions were never confirmed.

== In popular culture ==
According to an interview given by Gabriel García Márquez to Plinio Apuleyo Mendoza in his book El Olor de la Guayaba (The Guava's Scent), the character of Col. Aureliano Buendía in One Hundred Years of Solitude was loosely based on Rafael Uribe. García Márquez's grandfather was under Uribe's command in the Thousand Days War.

The assassination of Uribe and its subsequent investigation by Marco Tulio Anzola Samper is explored in detail by the Colombian novelist Juan Gabriel Vásquez in his novel The Shape of the Ruins.

The 18th locality of the Capital District of the capital city Bogotá, Colombia is named for Uribe.
