= Thousand Days' War =

Civil war in Colombia from 1899 to 1902

- Part of the Colombian Civil Wars
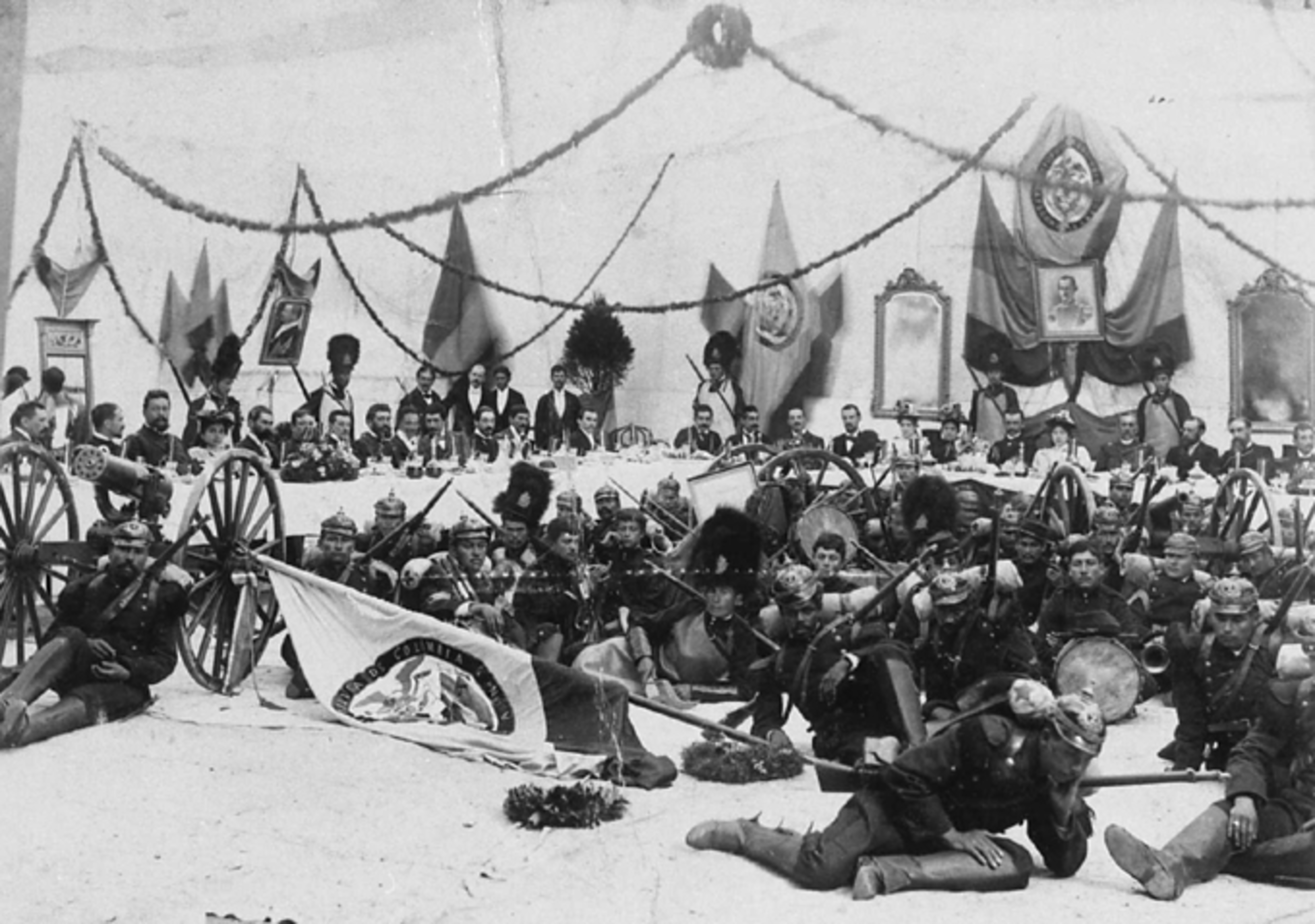
- Government soldiers at a banquet, 1899.
Date	17 October 1899 – 21 November 1902 (1,130 days)
Location	Colombia
Result	Colombian government victory: Continuation of the present day republic; Dissolution of the National Party; Separation of Panama; Economic and administrative crisis

Belligerents
Liberals; Supported by: Venezuela; Ecuador; Nicaragua; Guatemala	Republic of Colombia: Conservatives; National Party

Commanders and leaders
Gabriel Santos; Rafael Uribe; Benjamín Herrera; Justo Durán; Belisario Barahona; Lucas Barrera; Manuel de Reales; Avelino Rosas †; Victoriano Lorenzo †; Zenón Figueredo †; Aristóbulo Ibáñez †; Ramón Valdez; Pedro Martínez; Paulo Bustamante; Foción Soto; Juan Pinzón †; Benito Ulloa; Parmenio Guzman	Manuel Sanclemente; José Marroquín; José Santos; Manuel Welsares; Guillermo Calderón; Próspero Romero †; José Camacho; Ramón Valencia; Pedro Ospina; Arístides Fernández; Roberto Gómez; Alfredo Cobo; José Serrano; Carlos Albán †; Víctor Salazar; Joaquín Vélez; Jorge Mallarino; Rafael Viana; Marceliano Barrenche

Strength
5,000 (1899); 26,000 (1902)	15,000 (1899); 50,000 (1901–1902)

Casualties and losses
- 100,000–180,000

The Thousand Days' War (Spanish: Guerra de los Mil Días) was a civil war fought in Colombia from 17 October 1899 to 21 November 1902, at first between the Liberal Party and the government led by the National Party, and later – after the Conservative Party had ousted the National Party – between the liberals and the conservative government. Caused by the longstanding ideological tug-of-war of federalism versus centralism between the liberals, conservatives, and nationalists of Colombia following the implementation of the Constitution of 1886 and the political process known as the Regeneración, tensions ran high after the presidential election of 1898, and on 17 October 1899, official insurrection against the national government was announced by members of the Liberal Party in the Department of Santander. Hostilities did not begin until 11 November, when liberal factions attempted to take over the city of Bucaramanga, leading to active warfare. It would end three years later with the signing of the Treaty of Neerlandia and the Treaty of Wisconsin. The war resulted in a Conservative victory, and ensured the continued dominance of the Conservative Party in Colombian politics for another 28 years. Colombia's political structure as a unitary state has not been challenged since.

As an international conflict, the war extended into Ecuadorian and Venezuelan territories. Conservative and liberal factions of those two countries, as well as of Guatemala, El Salvador, and Nicaragua, backed their respective parties within Colombia. American interests in the Panama Isthmus led to an American intervention and naval deployment in Panama (then part of Colombia) under the guise of upholding the Mallarino–Bidlack Treaty.

With an estimated 100,000 to 180,000 fatalities, about 2.5–3.8 percent of the nation's population at that time, the conflict was the deadliest and most destructive civil war in the history of Colombia. It led to severe economic, political, and social repercussions for the country, including a partial collapse of the nation's economy, continued governmental instability, and the eventual loss of the Department of Panama as an incorporated territory of the republic in 1903.

== Prelude ==
Throughout the 19th century, Colombia was a politically unstable country. Different political forces – largely coalesced into conservatives and liberals – pushed for a unitary state on one side versus a federalized state on the other. Following the Civil War of 1885, when radical factions of the Liberal Party rebelled but ultimately failed against the administration of Rafael Nuñez – a moderate liberal who had the backing of the Conservative Party – the federalized Constitution of Rionegro of 1863 was replaced by the Constitution of 1886, thus beginning a centralist political process known as the Regeneración.

The Regeneración brought relative peace to Colombia, but ultimately failed to resolve the internal political and economic disputes between the disparate departments of the country. Continued tensions, coupled with a power vacuum left by President Manuel Antonio Sanclemente's inability to lead his office due to illness, eventually boiled over once more, leading to open insurrection and active warfare. On 17 October 1899, official insurrection against the National government was announced by members of the Liberal Party in the Department of Santander, and hostilities began in earnest on 11 November with the Battle of Bucaramanga.

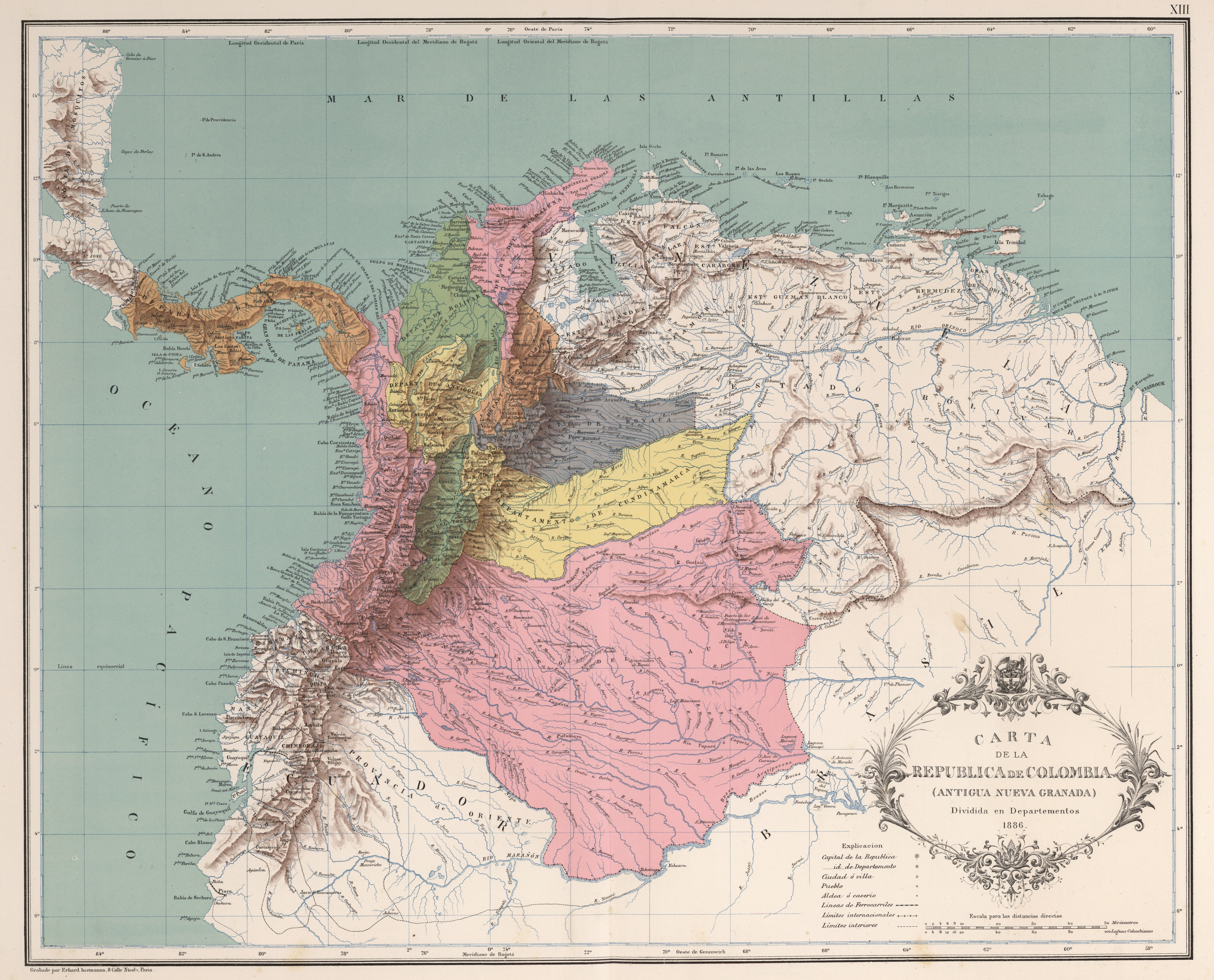
Departments of Colombia in 1890

== Events ==
=== Liberal Revolt ===
The intended date for the beginning of the civil war was October 20, 1899. However, due to the imprudence of some of the Liberal generals, especially Paolo Emilio Villar, who wished to begin the war on October 17, it was changed. The reaction of many Liberals was hesitant, since they believed that they did not have sufficient numbers or organization. Despite this, the rebellion began in the municipality of Socorro, Santander, and the rebels awaited military reinforcements from Venezuela.

The Conservative government, however, was not idle while this was occurring. They prepared a military force to be sent to Bucaramanga, the capital of Santander. The force never arrived, however, because the troops refused to accept payment by "tickets", which the government had to use due to the dire economic situation. No one expected, or was prepared for, a war that would last three years and would result in disaster to the country. With time, the war spread to every part of Colombia.

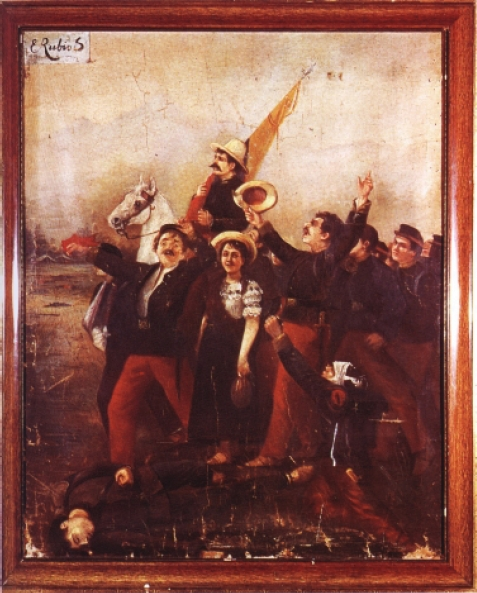
paintings depicting government troops after a victory

The first Liberal defeats came early during the war, with the Conservative victory at the Battle of Magdalena River on October 24. However, the Conservatives were in a delicate situation as well. The Conservatives had split into two factions, the Historical and National, in a frenetic attempt to bring order to the country. First, they dismissed President Sanclemente and replaced him with Jose Manuel Marroquin. In response, the Liberals nominated Gabriel Vargas Santos for the presidency.

The battles of Peralonso and Palonegro (in Santander) caused substantial damage. At Peralonso, the Liberals achieved victory by the direction of Rafael Uribe Uribe. At Palonegro (May 26, 1900) the Conservatives halted the enemy in what was an extraordinarily bloody encounter.

=== Beginning of the end ===
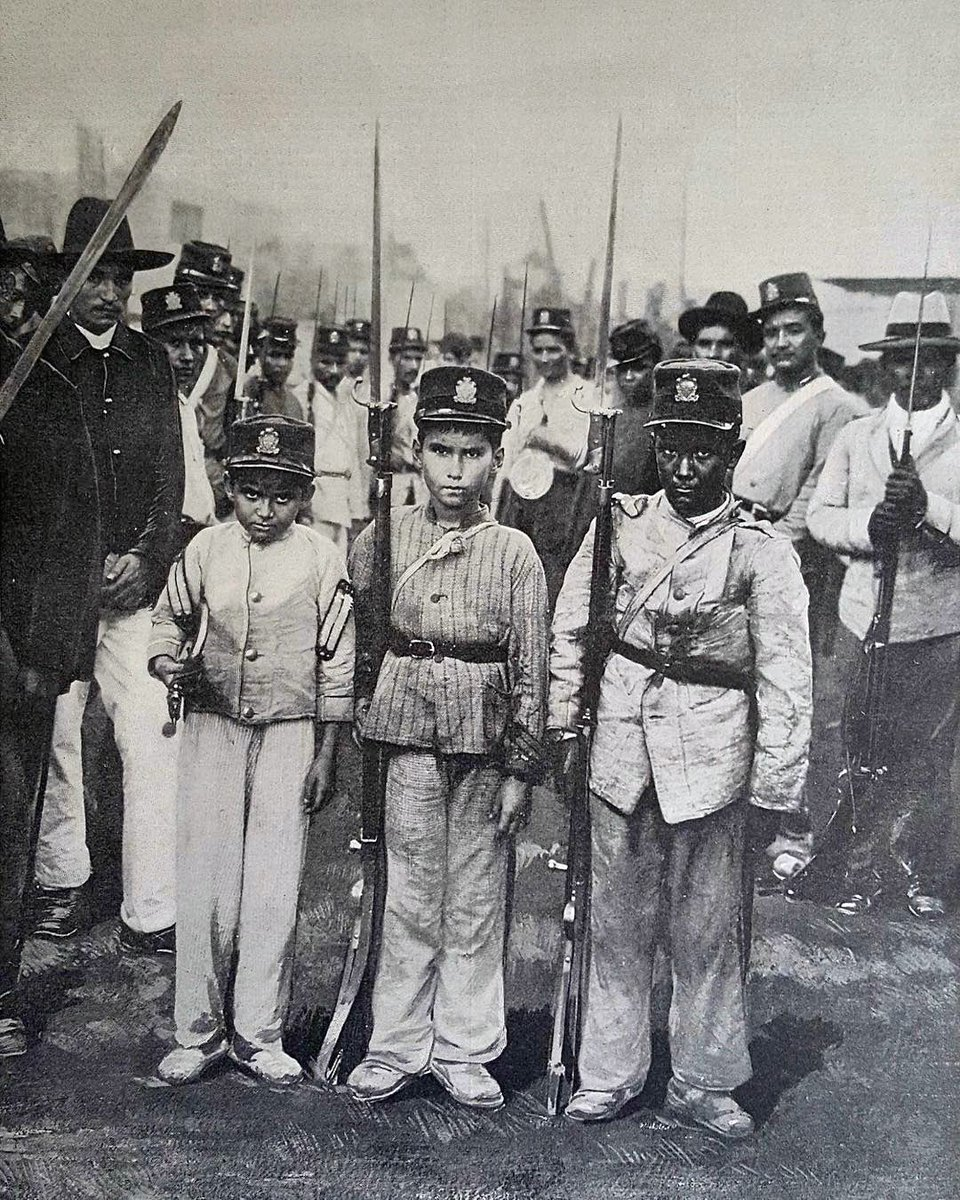
Child soldiers in Panama during the civil war of 1895. Child soldiers figured prominently in all of Colombia's civil wars during the 19th century, including the Thousand Days.

After Palonegro, the Liberals were divided into two different factions, this time pacifists and the warmongers. The Nationals of the Conservatives believed it was time to end the war, which by this time was mainly in the province of Panama and on the coast of the Caribbean Sea.

With that decision, internationalization of the war was avoided, though internationalization was promoted by Venezuelan president Cipriano Castro (who recognized Uribe Uribe as President of Colombia). Conservative troops commanded by Marroquín managed to reduce Venezuelan aid to the Liberals on 29 July 1901 during the Battle of San Cristóbal, who at this time were suffering defeats by the Conservative General Juan B. Tovar.

President Castro of Venezuela was the driving force of the war in late-1901, eventually pushing its continuation into 1902. In September 1901, Castro deployed 1,200 Venezuelan troops along with cannons, rifles and a machine gun into Colombia, with Venezuelans comprising a large portion of Liberal troops in border area. During the Battle of Riohacha, Castro sent a gunboat to block Conservative reinforcements from entering the city's harbor and order Venezuelan general José Antonio Dávila to manage Venezuelan troops alongside the Liberals. Errors by Venezuelan forces resulted with Colombian reinforcements landing near Riohacha and countering the joint Liberal-Venezuelan forces, resulting in a mass retreat and a victory for the Colombian army.

Eventually, General Uribe saw that the Liberals would not be able to defeat the Conservatives, and therefore was inclined to surrender, albeit with certain conditions.

== Treaties of Neerlandia and Wisconsin ==
The first peace treaty, which formalized the cessation of hostilities, was signed on the plantation Neerlandia on October 24, 1902; the fighting had ended by the mid-point of that year in Panama. From late 1901, fighting occurred between the ships Admiral Padilla (Liberal) and the Lautaro (Chilean property, lent to the conservatives), which was defeated by the former in front of the City of Panama on January 20, 1902.

Later the threat was from the American navy, sent by the government of Theodore Roosevelt to protect the United States' future interests in the construction of the Panama Canal. The Liberals, commanded by General Benjamin Herrera, were then forced to surrender. The subsequent assassination of Victoriano Lorenzo is understood among indigenous Panamanians as the loss of their struggle for land rights.

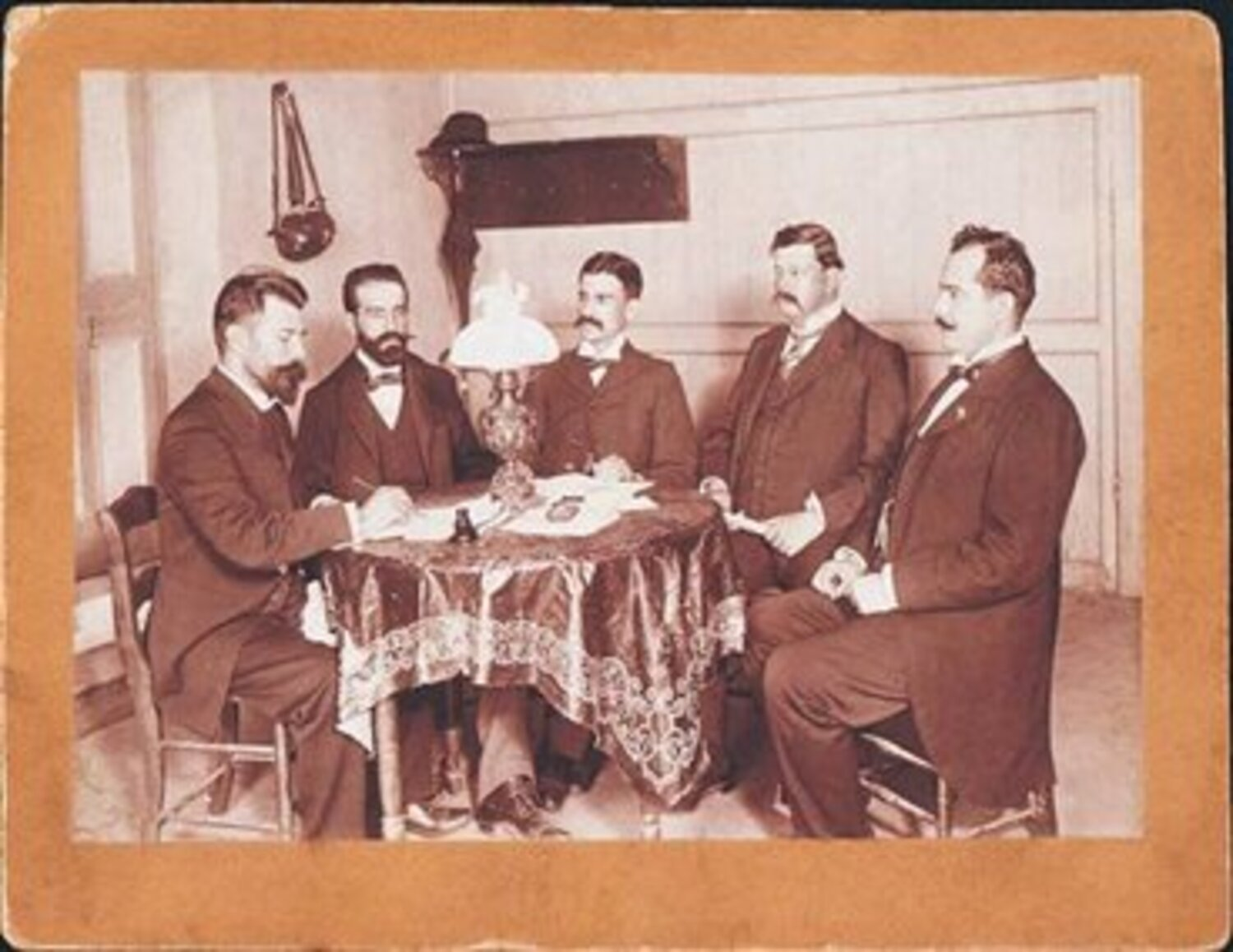
Signing of the Treaty of Wisconsin

The definitive peace treaty was signed on the American battleship Wisconsin on November 21, 1902. The Liberals were represented by General Lucas Caballero Barrera, who was in charge of the united army of Cauca and Panama, and Colonel Eusebio A. Morales, who was representing General Benjamin Herrera. The Conservatives were represented by General Víctor M. Salazar, governor of the Department of Panama, and General Alfredo Vázquez Cobo, Chief of Staff of the Conservative army on the Atlantic Coast, the Pacific, and Panama. Together, representing the entire government, they signed the end of the war.

== Fiction and popular culture ==
- In the Macondo works of Gabriel García Márquez, Colonel Aureliano Buendía is described as having fought on the Liberal side and been present at the signing of the Treaty of Neerlandia. In the novella No One Writes to the Colonel (1961), Buendía is an impoverished, retired colonel, who still hopes to receive his pension promised to him some fifteen years previously. The novel One Hundred Years of Solitude (1967), chronicles among other things the conflict between Colombia's Liberal and Conservative factions, including a fictionalized account of the signing of the Treaty of Neerlandia.
- Gabriel García Márquez's novel Memories of My Melancholy Whores (2004) identifies the day of death of the main character's father with the following lines: " [He] died in his widower's bed on the day the Treaty of Neerlandia was signed, putting an end to the War of the Thousand Days".
- In the animated Disney musical Encanto (2021), the war is mentioned in the opening narration by Abuela Alma.
- The post-apocalyptic film Furiosa: A Mad Max Saga (2024) name-drops the conflict in a narration of the history of war, amidst "the Wars of the Roses, the Oranges; the Opium Wars; the One-Day, Six-Day, Thousand-Day Wars; North against South, East against West..."
