= Benjamín Herrera =

Colombian politician and general

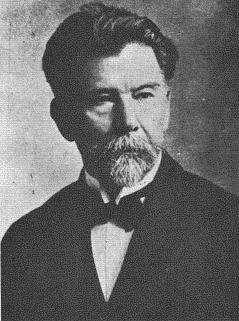
Benjamín Herrera

Benjamín Herrera Cortés (18 October 1853 – 29 February 1924) was a Colombian politician and general, born in Cali, Republic of New Granada. In 1875, while he was a student at the University of Cauca, Herrera joined the liberal army under César Conto to topple the conservative governor of Antioquia. He fought in the civil war for a decade until 1885, when the liberal forces were defeated and he decided to settle down in Pamplona, Colombia. In 1895 he returned to the political scene, gaining resources for a new liberal army against a new conservative governor. In the Thousand Days' War he became the main military strategist on the liberal side of the war, and, second to Rafael Uribe Uribe he became the main figure of Colombian liberalism. After the war, in 1905, he was elected to the Chamber of Representatives of Colombia. In 1905 and early 1906, he commanded the Colombian army forces confronting Venezuela, In 1909 Herrera became a senator, and in 1914 he became Minister of Agriculture under the government of Jose Vicente Concha. In 1922 he was the presidential candidate for the Colombian Liberal Party. He founded the Universidad Libre in 1923 (Free University). Herrera died in 1924.
