= Enrique Olaya Herrera =

President of Colombia from 1930 to 1934

His Excellency Enrique Olaya Herrera
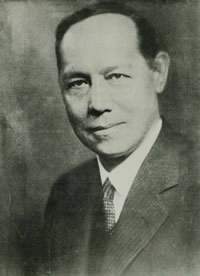

15th President of Colombia
- In office 7 August 1930 – 7 August 1934
- Preceded by: Miguel Abadia Mendez
- Succeeded by: Alfonso López Pumarejo

Colombian Ambassador to the Holy See
- In office 24 November 1935 – 18 February 1937
- President: Alfonso López Pumarejo
- Preceded by: Carlos Emilio Restrepo
- Succeeded by: Darío Echandía Olaya

Minister of Foreign Affairs
- In office 30 January 1935 – 18 May 1935
- President: Alfonso López Pumarejo
- Preceded by: Darío Echandia
- Succeeded by: Jorge Soto del Corral
- In office 18 June 1935 – 9 October 1935
- President: Alfonso López Pumarejo
- Preceded by: Jorge Soto del Corral
- Succeeded by: Ernesto González Piedrahita
- In office 21 November 1921 – 4 January 1922
- President: Jorge Holguín
- Preceded by: Miguel Arroyo Diez
- Succeeded by: Antonio Gómez Restrepo
- In office 7 August 1910 – 23 November 1911
- President: Carlos Eugenio Restrepo
- Preceded by: Carlos Caldero
- Succeeded by: José Maria González Valencia

Minister of Agriculture and Commerce
- In office 11 November 1921 – 28 November 1921
- President: Jorge Holguín
- Preceded by: Jesús del Corral
- Succeeded by: Lucas Caballero

Personal details
- Born: Enrique Alfredo Olaya Herrera; 12 November 1880 Guateque, Boyacá, United States of Colombia
- Died: 18 February 1937 (aged 56) Rome, Kingdom of Italy
- Party: Liberal
- Spouse: María Teresa Londoño (m. 1911)
- Children: María Olaya Londoño; Lucía Olaya Londoño
- Education: Republican University of Colombia; Université libre de Bruxelles
- Profession: Lawyer, Diplomat

Enrique Alfredo Olaya Herrera (12 November 1880 – 18 February 1937) was a Colombian journalist and politician. He served as President of Colombia from 7 August 1930 until 7 August 1934 representing the Colombian Liberal Party.

== Early years ==
Olaya Herrera grew up in a time of intellectual nonconformity and erudition, in a generation that had to live in through the Thousand Days War. He studied in the local public school of his hometown Guateque, in the Department of Boyacá as had his parents. He was son of Justiniano Olaya and Emperatriz Herrera, and had two brothers: Leonidas and Joaquín. When he was 12 years old, Olaya Herrera became known as the "child journalist of Guateque" after his founding of a newspaper called El Patriota (The Patriot) for which he managed to obtain many exchanges with major newspapers like El Espectador based in Medellín. Olaya Herrera studied law at the Universidad Republicana (later to become the Free University of Colombia), and founded a weekly magazine called El Estudiante (The Student) in a newspaper format, which was written by hand.

== Political career ==
Olaya Herrera is considered a member of the "Centennial Generation," corresponding to the cohort of political and intellectual leaders prominent at the time of the first century after the war of independence, roughly corresponding to the years from 1925 to 1940. Other members of this group were Alfonso López Pumarejo, Laureano Gómez, Eduardo Santos, Mariano Ospina Pérez, Roberto Urdaneta Arbeláez, Luis López de Mesa, Luis Eduardo Nieto Caballero and others.

As a journalist for the newspaper El Autonomista (The Autonomist) which was owned by Rafael Uribe Uribe and Ricardo Tirado Macias, Olaya Herrera made a name by criticizing the "Regeneration," which was the name of the numerous policies that marked the return of the country to a unitary state government system, as well as the rise of conservative, authoritarian, and clerical power following the Colombian Constitution of 1886. Back in his hometown of Guateque, Olaya Herrera maintained a newspaper called El Soldado Cubano (The Cuban Soldier) in which he showed his admiration for José Martí.

The political convulsion between the Liberal Party and the Conservative Party had escalated and provoked the thousand days civil war. Most of the centennial generation was pushed into the war following their political beliefs. Olaya Herrera was also pushed into active participation in politics in the Liberal Party. Olaya Herrera was radicalized and joined the armed liberal militias led by General Cenón Figueredo. Olaya Herrera participated in a confrontation in the village of Nocaima, Cundinamarca.

After the war Olaya Herrera continued studying law and finally graduated with a thesis entitled La Liberacion Condicional (The Conditional Liberation), which was then published by the university. In 1904 he obtained a doctorate in jurisprudence and in 1906 he traveled to Belgium where he studied diplomacy and sociology at the Université libre de Bruxelles focusing on diplomacy, politics and journalism.

== Politics and constitutional reform ==
Upon his return from Belgium, Olaya Herrera joined the cause against the government of General Rafael Reyes criticizing the treaties between the United States and Colombia, and the loss of Panama. On 13 March 1909 Olaya Herrera publicly made a speech during a Liberal Party event against Reyes' dictatorship, in the presence of the most important members of the Liberal Party. This made him officially a part of the political movement against the dictatorship that was initiated by Nicolás Esguerra, José Vicente Concha and Miguel Abadía Méndez, a movement that was called "Trecemarcismo," from "13 de Marzo" (March the 13th), after his speech. Once President Reyes had to resign as a result of their action, on 16 March 1909, Olaya Herrera put himself forward for the Constituent Assembly and was later elected. He helped reform the Colombian Constitution of 1886 representing the then-existing Quesada Department. Among his party members participating were Rafael Uribe Uribe, Benjamín Herrera, Gabriel Vargas Santos, Nicolás Esguerra, Tomás O. Eastman, Carmelo Arango and Tomás Quevedo Álvarez. The conservative deputies were Carlos E. Restrepo, José Vicente Concha, Pedro Nel Ospina, Guillermo Valencia, Emilio Forero, Hernando Holguín, Abel Carbonell, Pedro M. Carreño and Guillermo Quintero Calderón. Both sides concluded the constitutional reform and initiated a period of reconciliation, political tolerance and a sense of nationalism. Carlos Eugenio Restrepo assumed the presidency of Colombia from 1910 until 1914 sponsored by the Republican Party which Olaya Herrera supported.

President Restrepo appointed Olaya Herrera as the first Minister of Foreign Relations on 7 August 1910 until his resignation on 23 November 1911. During the administration of President Jorge Holguín, Olaya Herrera was appointed to the same office from 1921 until 4 January 1922, and also served as Minister of Agriculture. During the 1920s Olaya Herrera served also as a diplomat (mainly improving Colombian relations with the United States) and with the Colombian congress.

== Presidential candidate ==
During the 1930s the Liberal leadership considered Olaya Herrera as the most suitable leader to recover the presidency from the Regeneration Movement hegemony. He was appointed by the Liberal party in Bogotá as presidential candidate after a group of liberal and conservative friends registered him in the candidates list on 22 January 1930 in the town of Puerto Berrío. Olaya Herrera named his political movement "Concentracion Nacional" (National Concentration).

Olaya Herra was elected on 9 February 1930 with 369,962 votes against the other candidates Guillermo Valencia with 213,417 votes and Alfredo Vázquez Cobo with 213,417 votes. Former conservative president Carlos Eugenio Restrepo gave his support to Olaya Herrera along with other moderate conservatives.

Olaya Herrera's victory in the 1930 presidential election put an end to a period of unbroken conservative rule, sometimes referred as the Conservative Hegemony, from 1886.

== Presidency ==
Olaya Herrera's government was characterized at first by compromise, allocating half of his government's public offices (mainly ministries and government departments) to the opposition party led by Laureano Gómez, although these party members were gradually pushed out of office.

His term was characterized by a profound interest in social problems and reforms: workers' legislation, public assistance, protection for workers and farmers, and others. This agenda was interrupted by the urgent attention required by the Wall Street crash of 1929, and its repercussions all over the world. Olaya Herrera started a cycle of national protectionism, which fostered the development of industry with national capital as the basis for developmental stimuli, emphasizing internal demand. Imports decreased significantly, as did the prices of coffee in the international market. This protectionist trend promoted a nationalist consciousness that turned the country further away from the free-trade policies of the nineteenth century.

The Liberal Party passed legislation that reintroduced universal male suffrage in Colombia.

=== Economic crisis and War with Peru ===
After the Wall Street crash of 1929 Olaya Herrera was given special powers and dictated some economic reforms that developed at some level the industry and attempted to manage the debt generated by the war with Peru which originated in 1932 when the Amazonian port of Leticia was taken over by invading Peruvian soldiers. Previously, during the presidency of Jorge Holguin, the Salomón–Lozano Treaty which defined the Peru-Colombia border was signed in secrecy. Once the treaty became known to the public in Peru, it became unpopular and a group of Peruvian citizens took the town of Leticia, which was colonized by both Peruvians and Colombians, and which the treaty had awarded to Colombia. General Alfredo Vázquez Cobo was entrusted by Olaya Herrera to lead the armed operations in southern Colombia. The war was financed by the government and the solidarity of the citizens, who donated jewelry and money to support the cause. After many battles the war ended with the signing of the Rio Protocol in 1934, which upheld the Salomón–Lozano Treaty and officially ended the border conflicts between Colombia and Peru.

=== Public works ===
During his government Olaya Herrera tried to develop the Colombian national industry and for this he supported many infrastructure projects mainly highways, maritime and fluvial ports (Barranquilla and Buenaventura) and railroads. He also supported public education and the exploration and exploitation of energy natural resources such as oil, mainly in the northern region of Catatumbo.

Olaya Herrera also tried to improve the association between guilds, for which he created a Bank of Agrarian Credit (Spanish: Caja de Crédito Agrario), the Mortgage Central Bank (Spanish: Banco Central Hipotecario) to finance low income housing and for the improvement of production and exporting of coffee products; the government of Olaya Herrera also created the National Federation of Coffee Growers of Colombia. He also helped introduce labor law reforms.

=== Public order issues ===
During his first two years as president there were two main foci of violence in the country; in Boyaca and Santander initially motivated by political reasons. The towns with most problems were Chiquinquirá, the towns of western Boyaca, the Garcia Rovira Province in Santander Department and some towns in the areas of Norte de Santander Department, where conservative public employees resisted being in charge of liberals until the end of his government on 7 August 1934.

== Post-government and death ==
After finishing his term as president in 1935 Olaya Herrera was appointed Minister of Foreign Relations during the government of Alfonso López Pumarejo and later appointed ambassador of Colombia to the State of the Vatican City in Rome, Italy, where he died on 18 February 1937 serving. He had been planning to run for reelection as president upon his return to Colombia.

== Personal life ==
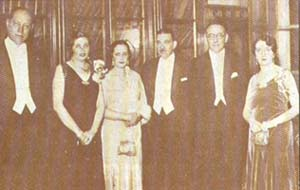
Enrique and María Michelsen de López (left), Clemencia Holguín and Roberto Urdaneta (centre), Alfonso López Pumarejo and María Teresa Londoño (right) at the Jockey Club de Bogotá – 7 August 1934

Olaya Herrera married María Teresa Londoño Sáenz in 1911 and had two daughters; Maria and Lucia.

He died of a stroke.

Political offices
Preceded by Miguel Abadía Méndez	President of Colombia; 1930–1934	Succeeded by Alfonso López Pumarejo
