= 1900 Colombian coup d'état =

- Part of Thousand Days' War
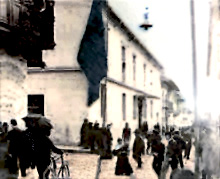
- The coup d'état was announced at the Palacio de San Carlos, on the afternoon of 31 July 1900.
Date	31 July 1900
Location	Colombia
Result	Coup successful, President Manuel Antonio Sanclemente overthrown

The 1900 Colombian coup d'état occurred on 31 July of that year, and consisted of the peaceful seizure of power by Vice President José Manuel Marroquín, who, supported by the Conservative Party and the Liberal Party, overthrew Manuel Antonio Sanclemente, member of the National Party. The coup occurred in the context of the Thousand Days' War, and took advantage of President Sanclemente's delicate state of health, advanced age, and unpopularity.

== Background ==
The direct antecedents of the coup can be found in the 1880s and 1890s. In 1886, after more than 20 years of a radical liberal regime, the government of Rafael Núñez promulgated the 1886 constitution. Núñez would later fall ill and his vice president, Miguel Antonio Caro, would go on to exercise executive power, assuming the presidency when Núñez died in 1894.

During Caro's mandate, the differences between the historical sector of the Conservative Party and the National Party became more acute. Caro concluded his mandate in the midst of a serious political crisis due to the division of conservatism, as well as marked by the increasingly evident war preparations of the Liberal Party, which had just been defeated in the contests of 1885 and 1895. Likewise, the decadent The economic situation, caused by the collapse of coffee prices, generated a growing inflation, the halt in the execution of public works and the delay in the salaries of government officials, forcing the government to resort to unpopular measures such as the creation of the Board of Issuance and the monopolization of the tobacco industry.

For the 1898 presidential elections, Caro appointed Minister of War, Manuel Antonio Sanclemente, as the candidate of the National Party, trusting in the ease with which he would manipulate Sanclemente and stay in power. In those elections, the historical sector nominated the 1895 civil war hero, General Rafael Reyes, as vice-presidential candidate, and former President Guillermo Quintero Calderón as vice-presidential candidate; At the last moment, Quintero was designated presidential candidate and Marceliano Vélez as vice-presidential candidate.

Finally, Sanclemente was elected president with 78.5% of the votes. The fact that the votes for Sanclemente were five times those received by the liberal Samper-Soto formula, triggered protests about a possible electoral fraud, among which those made by the conservative intellectual Carlos Martínez Silva stood out, who assured in a speech that the electorate Liberal comprised at least half of the country. These complaints were welcomed within liberalism, especially in the sectors in favor of fighting the government with arms. This was one of the justifications that the following year gave rise to the Thousand Days' War.

=== Thousand Days' War and Government of Sanclemente ===
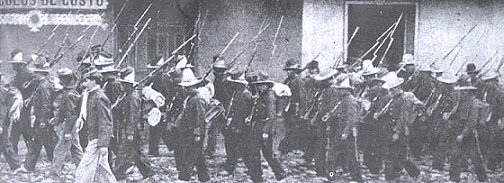
Troops during the Thousand Days' War

Due to health reasons, Sanclemente could not take office as he should on 7 August 1898, and he sent Marroquín to assume power. Such was Caro's mistrust of Marroquín that he, in turn, appointed diplomat Rafael Pinto Valderrama to hand over power to Marroquín.

From the beginning of his mandate, Sanclemente had to face the fierce liberal opposition and the so-called historical sector of the Conservative Party, which had become in favor of a presidency for Marroquín. Exercising power in the first months of the Sanclemente government, he implemented several political and economic reforms promoted by the Liberals and historical Conservatives, which caused the alarm of the National Party, forcing Sanclemente to assume power in November 1899. This event hardenedf the political situation and the frustration of the reformers. Due to his advanced age, Sanclemente had to move the seat of government from cold Bogotá to warmer towns, first Anapoima, then Tena, and finally to Villeta.

The economic crisis resulting from the fall in coffee prices and the recession in exports reduced imports, which, in turn, caused a decrease in tax collection, the main source of government income. As part of the austerity measures, the Government reduced the number of members of the Armed Forces, discharging more than 1,000 soldiers by December 1899. Likewise, it instructed its Minister of Finance, Carlos Calderón, to obtain internal loans and/or external, and solve the shortage of cash without having to resort to the issuance of paper money, a measure widely unpopular.

Despite the government's attempts to end the economic and political crisis, the situation only worsened, and in August 1899 the Conservative Party withdrew support for the Sanclemente government. This situation provided the necessary pretext for the warmongering sector of the Liberal Party to start the Thousand Days' War in October 1899. The war began in the coffee growing regions governed by liberal elites, severely affected by the aforementioned economic crisis.

The beginning of the War caused the Issuance Board, which fulfilled the functions of issuer, to reseal a large number of banknotes that had been issued by private banks before 1887, when this activity was prohibited. This, added to the new emissions of the government and the revolutionary army, caused an excessive inflation that was used by the opposition to justify the coup. The beginning of the war also caused a political reorganization: the nationalists received the support of a good part of the historical ones, which allowed them to infiltrate high government positions, and the pacifist liberals lost ground with respect to the warmongering liberals.

== The coup ==
=== Preparations ===
During the war, the ruling National party, headed by President Sanclemente, sought to negotiate with the so-called historical conservatives who were in the Conservative Party, including some of them in the government, to use their support for the need to expand the military apparatus. In turn, in the attempt to pacify the country, certain directorial liberals were included in the cabinet, such as Nicolás Esguerra as commissioner to deal with the Panama Canal company, and Carlos Arturo Torres as its secretary. However, this would be useless, since the historical conservatives were in conflict with the nationalists and had affinities with the liberals, who also had no intention of negotiating with the government.

Even so, the government managed to face the two bloodiest battles of the war: Peralonso, in which the liberals triumphed, and after which they sent a peace proposal to the government, which was rejected, and Palonegro, which meant the decisive defeat of the liberals, never managing to recover from the battle.

Alarmed by the direction of the war, thirty-one historical conservatives, between civilians and military, quickly began to conspire to stage a coup; the conservatives contacted the head of liberalism, Aquileo Parra, and offered him the presidency in mid-1900. The conservatives had planned that after the coup an honorable peace would be sought without reprisals (which would not take place), the call of a constituent body for elections, freedom for political prisoners, and separation from the government of Arístides Fernández, who was hated by liberalism.

As part of the preparations, the smear campaign against the government was intensified, generating accusations of misgovernment, based on facts such as that the executive power was divided between Bogotá and Villeta and that some ministers of the office had stamps with the president's signature, lending this to acts of corruption; In addition, they accused the Minister of Government, Rafael María Palacio, of exercising a de facto government. In reality, these accusations turned out to be baseless and exaggerated.

=== Events of 31 July ===
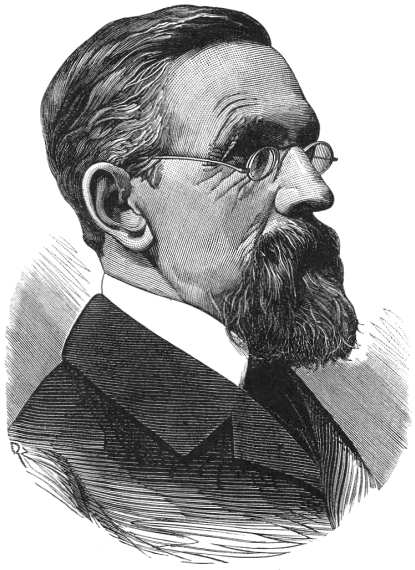
José Manuel Marroquín

Minister of War, Manuel Casabianca, indirectly facilitated the coup by naming General Jorge Moya Vásquez, one of the 31 historical figures of the plot, as commander of the Sumapaz forces. General Moya, with a force of a thousand men, moved from Soacha threatening to march on Villeta and, in fact, he made his way to Bogotá, where he arrived in the afternoon of 31 July. But the indecisive attitude of a large part of the army officers and the absence of Marroquín made Moya doubt the outcome of the situation and he resigned before General Casabianca.

This created great tension in the Bogotá garrisons that had to negotiate. The coup took place in the afternoon of 31 July. Police commander Arístides Fernández guaranteed the success of the movement by dispatching a force to appoint Marroquín as president of Colombia, while Sanclemente was informed in his private residence after 300 men were sent to Villeta where he was, despite being protected by 500 soldiers, they did not resist and Sanclemente would be arrested. As night fell, the cannons of the Palacio de San Carlos sounded in unison, announcing Sanclemente's departure from the government. Marroquín assumed power that same day, and remained in power for two more years.
