= Gilibert =

Gilibert is a surname. Notable people with the surname include:

- Jean Marie Marcelin Gilibert (1839–1923), French Commissioner in the French Gendarmerie
- Jean-Emmanuel Gilibert (1741–1814), French politician, botanist, freemason, and doctor

== See also ==
- Gilbert (surname)
