= María Teresa Londoño =

First Lady of Colombia from 1930 to 1934

First Lady of Colombia
- In role August 7, 1930 – August 7, 1934
- President: Enrique Olaya Herrera
- Preceded by: Leonor de Velasco Álvarez
- Succeeded by: María Michelsen de López

Personal details
- Born: María Teresa Londoño Sáenz; May 20, 1882 Bogotá, D.C., Colombia
- Died: May 5, 1962 (aged 79) Bogotá, D.C., Colombia
- Resting place: Central Cemetery of Bogotá
- Party: Liberal
- Spouse: Enrique Olaya Herrera (m. 1911; died 1937)
- Children: María; Lucia

María Teresa Londoño de Olaya (née Londoño Sáenz; May 20, 1882 - May 5, 1962) was a Colombian housewife, socialite and the First Lady of Colombia from 1930 to 1934 as the wife of President Enrique Olaya Herrera. María Teresa was characterized by having great political relevance during the Olaya Herrera administration, being the first time that the wife of a president obtained relevance from the media.

== First Lady of Colombia (1930-1934) ==
Her husband, nominated from the Liberal party, defeated his opponent, President Miguel Abadía Méndez, who was seeking re-election by obtaining the nomination again from the Conservative party. Londoño was known for accompanying her husband and her daughters during the presidential campaign, something never before seen during a Presidential elections in Colombia.

"The presidential family had great coverage by the media, this was the great sense of fashion reflected by María Teresa and her daughters during the great events and dances held at the San Carlos Palace throughout the Presidency of Enrique Olaya Herrera".

In October 1932, María Teresa organized and led, together with her daughters, the collection called "Patriotic Collection", in order to support the front-line military during the Colombian-Peruvian war.

Honorary titles
Preceded by Leonor de Velasco Álvarez	First Lady of Colombia; 1930-1934	Succeeded by María Michelsen de López
