= 1926 Colombian presidential election =

Presidential elections were held in Colombia on 14 February 1926. The result was a victory for Miguel Abadía Méndez of the Conservative Party, who received 99.9% of the vote. He took office on 7 August 1926.

== Results ==
Candidate	Party	Votes	%
Miguel Abadía Méndez	Colombian Conservative Party	370,494	99.88
Others		432	0.12
Total		370,926	100.00
Source: Nohlen
