= 1914 Colombian presidential election =

- 10 February 1914
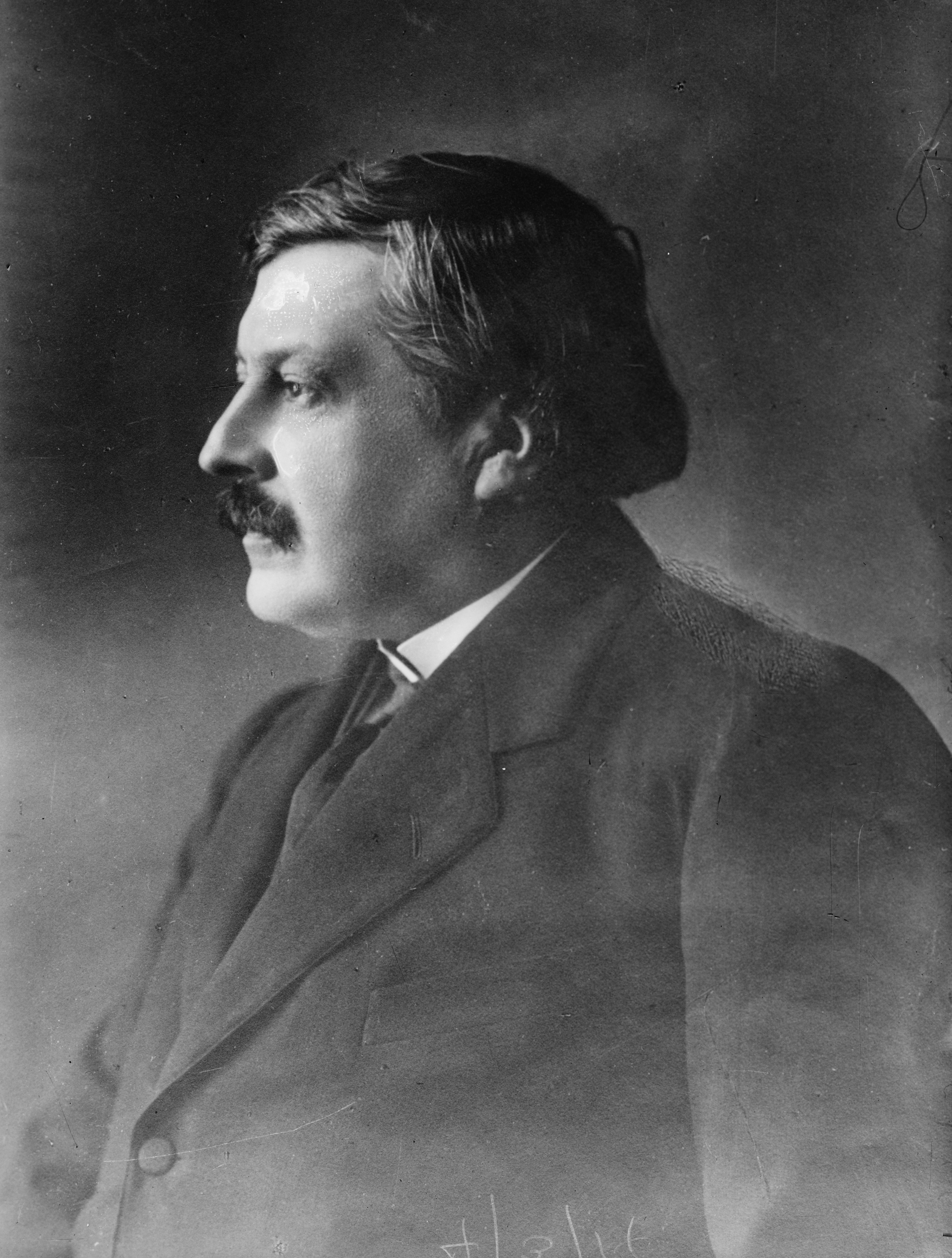

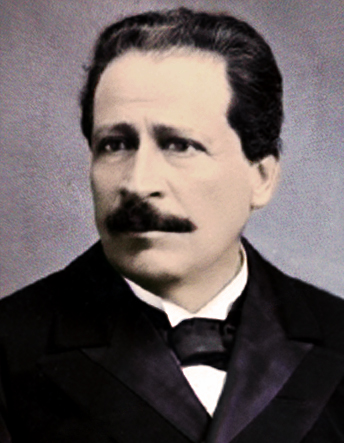
Nominee	José Vicente Concha	Nicolás Esguerra
Party	Conservative	Liberal
Alliance	–	Republican Union
Home state	Bogotá	Bogotá
Popular vote	300,735	36,763
Percentage	89.08%	10.89%
President before election
Carlos Eugenio Restrepo
Conservative
Elected President
José Vicente Concha
Conservative

Presidential elections were held in Colombia on 10 February 1914. They were the first direct presidential elections since 1860. The result was a victory for José Vicente Concha of the Conservative Party, who received 89% of the vote. Vicente took office on 7 August.

== Results ==
Candidate	Party	Votes	%
José Vicente Concha	Colombian Conservative Party	300,735	89.08
Nicolás Esguerra	Colombian Liberal Party–Republican Party	36,763	10.89
Others		99	0.03
Total		337,597	100.00
Source: Nohlen
