= 1922 Colombian presidential election =

Presidential elections were held in Colombia in February 1922. The result was a victory for Pedro Nel Ospina of the Conservative Party, who received 62% of the vote. He took office on 7 August.

His main opponent, Benjamín Herrera of the Liberal Party, was also supported by the Socialist Party. The Liberal Party claimed that the election had been marred by blatant fraud.

== Results ==
Candidate	Party	Votes	%
Pedro Nel Ospina	Colombian Conservative Party	413,619	61.73
Benjamín Herrera	Colombian Liberal Party	256,231	38.24
José Vicente Concha		118	0.02
Others		81	0.01
Total		670,049	100.00
Valid votes		670,049	99.98
Invalid/blank votes		105	0.02
Total votes		670,154	100.00
Source: Historia Electoral Colombiana
