= Carolina Vásquez de Ospina =

First Lady of Colombia from 1922 to 1926

First Lady of Colombia
- In role August 7, 1922 – August 7, 1926
- President: Pedro Nel Ospina
- Preceded by: Cecilia Arboleda de Holguín
- Succeeded by: Leonor de Velasco Álvarez

First Lady of Antioquia
- In role September 18, 1918 – April 12, 1920
- Governor: Pedro Nel Ospina
- Preceded by: Carlota González
- Succeeded by: Manuela Ospina Villa

Personal details
- Born: Carolina Vásquez Uribe; December 4, 1869 Medellín, Antioquia, United States of Colombia
- Died: May 12, 1955 (aged 85) Medellín, Antioquia, Colombia
- Party: Conservative
- Spouse: Pedro Nel Ospina (m. 1912; died 1927)
- Children: Elena; Pedro; Eduardo; María; Luis; Santiago; Manuel

Carolina Vásquez de Ospina (née Vásquez Uribe; December 4, 1869 — May 12, 1955) was a Colombian politician, businesswoman, philanthropist and wife of President Pedro Nel Ospina, having served as First Lady of Colombia from 1922 to 1926 and previously as First Lady of Antioquia from 1918 to 1920. Vasquez is considered one of the precursors of the colonization of southwestern Antioquia.

== Early life ==
Carolina Vásquez Uribe was born on December 4, 1869, in Medellín, Antioquia as the only child of Eduardo Vásquez and Elena Uribe Uribe. His father was an important Antioquia businessman, son of businessman Pedro Vásquez Calle, nephew of Enriqueta Vásquez Jaramillo, wife of Mariano Ospina Rodríguez, 1st president of the Grenadine Confederation.

Vásquez Uribe inherited several properties from her grandfather, later in 1922 her husband, the Conservative politician Pedro Nel Ospina, would be elected president of Colombia during the 1922 Colombian presidential election, in which he would obtain a wide advantage over the Liberal candidate Benjamín Herrera, thus becoming Ospina. became the 11th president of Colombia, so Carolina would serve as First Lady of Colombia from 1922 to 1926. After the death of her husband, she inherited all his businesses, among which the Marta Magdalena cattle ranch in Montería, Córdoba, as well as other properties, would stand out. Later in 1933, after the death of her father, she inherited shares of the Sociedad Agrícola del Sinú and The same year he would buy all the shares. By 1942 Carolina would become the richest woman in Medellín with a net worth of COP 1,651,240.

Honorary titles
Preceded by Carlota González	First Lady of Antioquia; 1818–1820	Succeeded by Manuela Ospina Villa
Preceded by Cecilia Arboleda de Holguín	First Lady of Colombia; 1922–1926	Succeeded by Leonor de Velasco Álvarez
