= Mariano Ospina =

Mariano Ospina may refer to:

Presidents of Colombia

- Mariano Ospina Rodríguez, president 1857–1861.
- Mariano Ospina Pérez, president 1946–1950.

== See also ==
- Pedro Nel Ospina, president 1922–1926, son of Mariano Ospina Rodríguez
