= José Eusebio Caro =

Colombian writer, journalist and politician (1817–1853)

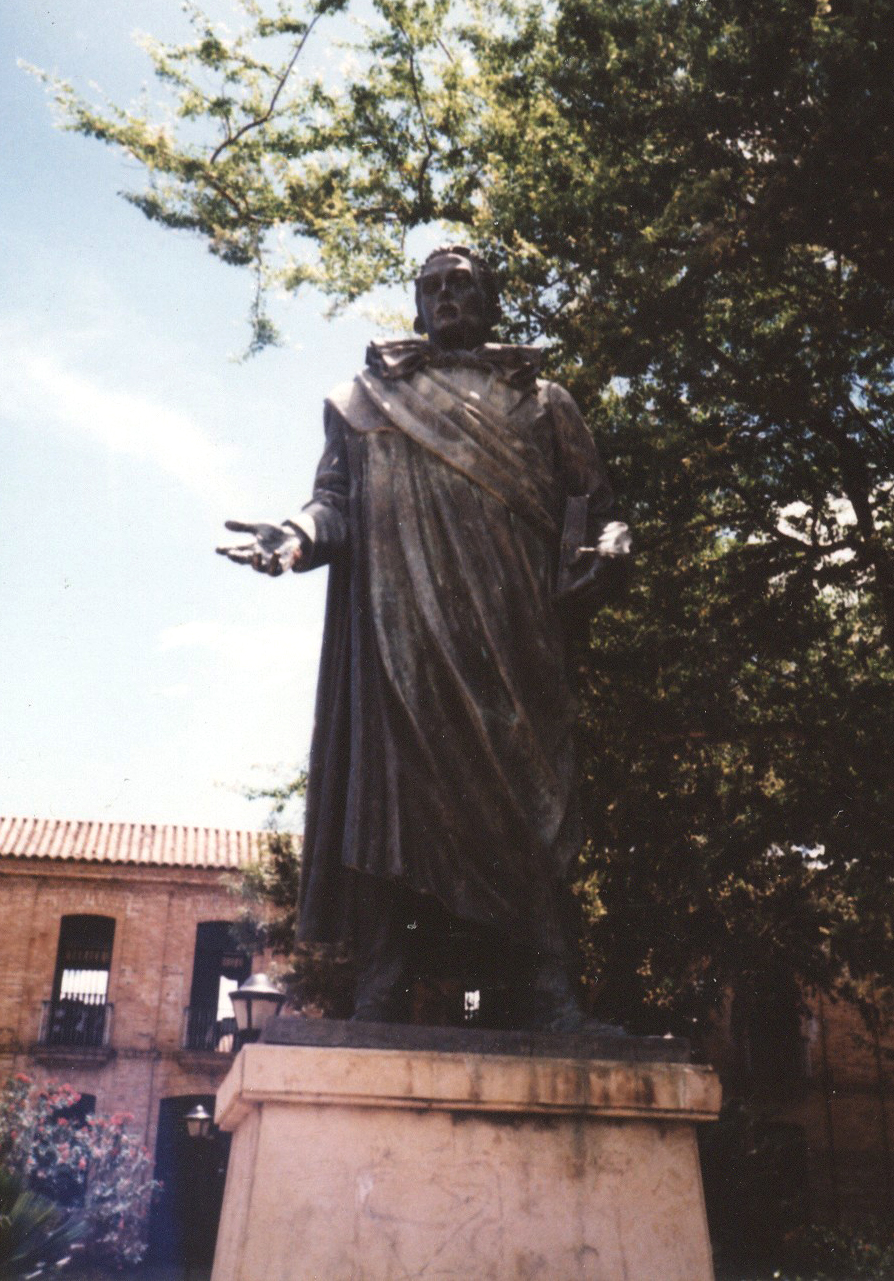
- José Eusebio Caro
- Born: March 5, 1817
- Died: January 28, 1853 (aged 35)
- Occupation: Politician

José Eusebio Caro Ibáñez (March 5, 1817 – January 28, 1853) was a writer, journalist, and politician from New Granada. He was born in Ocaña, Norte de Santander and studied law at the Colegio de San Bartolomé in Bogotá. Married to Blasina Tobar Finch in 1843, he was the father of future Colombian president Miguel Antonio Caro as well as future first lady Margarita Caro Tobar, the wife of another president Carlos Holguin Mallarino.

== Career ==
He was a co-founder of the Colombian Conservative Party. As a writer, his most notable works were only published after his death. Among these are his letters, philosophical writings and poetry.

== Personal life ==
He died in Santa Marta.
