= María Antonia Suárez =

Acting First Lady of Colombia from 1918 to 1919

First Lady of Colombia
- Acting; August 7, 1918 – March 3, 1919
- President: Marco Fidel Suárez
- Preceded by: Elvira Cárdenas de Concha
- Succeeded by: Cecilia Arboleda de Holguín

Personal details
- Born: María Antonia Suárez Orratia; June 5, 1895 Bogotá, Colombia
- Died: August 7, 1950 (aged 55) Bogotá, Colombia
- Party: Conservative
- Spouse: Roberto Morales (m. 1919)
- Parent(s): Marco Fidel Suárez; Isabel Orrantia

María Antonia Suárez de Morales (née Suárez Orrantia; June 5, 1897 - August 7, 1950) was a Colombian housewife, daughter of the 9th President Marco Fidel Suárez. Suárez served as Acting First Lady of Colombia from 1918 until her marriage in 1919, since her mother, Isabel Orrantia, had died years before her father became President of Colombia.

María Antonia was one of the most influential people in the Suárez administration, during her two years as acting first lady.

Honorary titles
Preceded by Elvira Cárdenas de Concha	First Lady of Colombia; 1918–1919	Succeeded by Cecilia Arboleda de Holguín
