= 1930 Colombian presidential election =

Presidential elections were held in Colombia on 9 February 1930. The result was a victory for Enrique Olaya Herrera of the Liberal Party, who received 44.9% of the vote. He took office on 7 August.

It was the first time since direct presidential elections were introduced in 1914 that a Conservative Party candidate had not won. The Conservative Party was divided, splitting its vote between two conservative candidates. Conservatives had governed Colombia since 1886.

Enrique Olaya Herrera campaigned on Colombian industrialization, improvements in public education, improvements in public health.

== Results ==
Candidate	Party	Votes	%
Enrique Olaya Herrera	Colombian Liberal Party	369,934	44.91
Guillermo Valencia	Colombian Conservative Party	240,360	29.18
Alfredo Vásquez Cobo	Colombian Conservative Party	213,470	25.91
Total		823,764	100.00
Valid votes		823,764	99.92
Invalid/blank votes		660	0.08
Total votes		824,424	100.00
Registered voters/turnout		987,504	83.49
Source: Historia Electoral Colombiana
