= Elvira Cárdenas de Concha =

First Lady of Colombia from 1914 to 1918

First Lady of Colombia
- In role August 7, 1914 – August 7, 1918
- President: José Vicente Concha
- Preceded by: Isabel Gaviria de Restrepo
- Succeeded by: María Antonia Suárez

Personal details
- Born: Elvira Cárdenas Mosquera; April 12, 1870 Popayán, Cauca, Colombia
- Died: June 22, 1935 (aged 65) Bogotá, D.C., Colombia
- Party: Conservative
- Spouse: José Vicente Concha
- Parent(s): Jeremías Cárdenas (father); Clelia Mosquera (mother)

Elvira Cárdenas Mosquera de Concha (April 12, 1870 - June 22, 1935) was a Colombian housewife and socialite, serving as First Lady of Colombia from 1914 and 1918 through her marriage to the 8th President of Colombia José Vicente Concha.

== Biography ==
Cárdenas Mosquera was born on April 12, 1870, in Popayán, Cauca, to Jeremias Cárdenas and Clelia Mosquera, daughter of Tomas Cipriano de Mosquera who served as the 1st and 4th President of the United States of Colombia, as well as the 4th and 3rd President of the Granadine Confederation and New Granada, both predecessor states to current Colombia.

Honorary titles
Preceded by Isabel Gaviria de Restrepo	First Lady of Colombia; 1914-1918	Succeeded by María Antonia Suárez
