= Jean Marie Marcelin Gilibert =

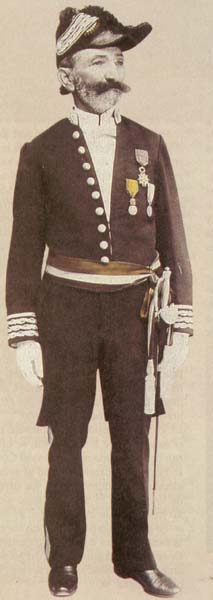
Portrait of Jean Marie Marcelin Gilibert

Jean Marie Marcelin Gilibert, also known as Juan Maria Marcelino Gilibert (24 February 1839 – 11 September 1923), was a French Commissioner in the French Gendarmerie. He was sent to Colombia as part of an exchange program between the two countries to help found the National Police of Colombia on 5 November 1891 and was its first commissioner.

== Early life ==
Gilibert was born in Fustignac in the French department of Haute Garonne on 24 February 1839. He joined the French Army at the age of 22 and rose to become a sergeant-major.

Gilibert served during the Franco-Prussian War and was wounded at the battle of Reichshoffen. During the war he was captured three times, escaping each time. He was awarded the French military medal for his service.

After the war, Gilibert travelled with his regiment to Constantinople, where he was appointed a police commissioner of the 5th class. He later rose to become the commissioner of the 1st class in Lille.

== Colombia ==
At the request of the Colombian chargé d'affaires, Gonzalo Mallarino, Gilibert was selected to reorganise the Bogotá police, known as the National Police, based on his knowledge of Spanish and his experience, and arrived in the country in late 1891. On 1 January 1892 he presented the new Bogotá police service, consisting of 450 officers organised in six districts, to President Carlos Holguin and his ministers in a parade. Local press reports from this period describe him rarely leaving his offices and strictly enforcing discipline, including dismissing two officers who claimed to have seen a ghost. Gilibert's contract expired in August 1892 but he remained on as an instructor to the force.

Between 15 and 17 January 1893 a series of riots by artisans and craftsmen known as the “anarchist insurrection of 1893” erupted in Bogotá. Anger towards the police force caused by its professionalisation and its crackdown on street crime and prostitution, as well as Gilibert's alienation from the local populace and recruitment of officers from outside the city is thought to have contributed to the breakout of rioting. Under Gilibert's leadership, the police responded violently, with many arrests.

In 1894 Gilibert also had a role in uncovering a coup-plot by artisans, buying off one of the plotters with 200 pesos. He also had a role in uncovering a liberal coup plot against the governing conservatives in Bogotá in January 1895, though this did not prevent a series of liberal uprisings timed to occur simultaneously elsewhere resulting in a civil war in that year.

In 1898 Gilibert tended his resignation from the directorate of the Bogotá police, claiming that his resources were insufficient for his task. He later reassumed the directorate under the government of General Rafael Reyes and continued to serve as an advisor until his death in Bogotá on 11 September 1923.
