= Leonor de Velasco Álvarez =

First Lady of Colombia from 1926 to 1930

Leonor de Velasco de Abadía

First Lady of Colombia
- In role August 7, 1926 – August 7, 1930
- President: Miguel Abadía Méndez
- Preceded by: Carolina Vásquez de Ospina
- Succeeded by: María Teresa Londoño

Personal details
- Born: Leonor de Velasco Álvarez; July 30, 1907 Bogotá, D.C., Colombia
- Died: January 14, 1975 (aged 67) Bogotá, D.C., Colombia
- Party: Conservative
- Spouse: Miguel Abadía Méndez (m. 1926; died 1947)

Leonor de Velasco Álvarez de Abadía (July 30, 1907 - January 14, 1975) was the First Lady of Colombia from 1926 to 1930, through her marriage to the 13th president Miguel Abadía Méndez.

== Biography ==
Leonor de Velasco Álvarez was born on July 30, 1907 to Enrique de Velasco and Mercedes Álvarez in Bogotá.

She completed her high school studies at the María Auxiliadora Women's Catholic School in Bogotá.

== First Lady of Colombia (1926-1930) ==
On June 5, 1926, Leonor married the then elected-President of Colombia, Miguel Abadía Méndez, being the first time in the history of Colombia that a presidential wedding occurred.

As host of San Carlos Palace de Velasco Álvarez was characterized by holding numerous social events held every month known as the "Palace Receipts" which were only attended by diplomats as well as those close to the Abadía Méndez administration.

Honorary titles
Preceded by Carolina Vásquez de Ospina	First Lady of Colombia; 1926-1930	Succeeded by María Teresa Londoño
