= Cecilia Arboleda de Holguín =

First Lady of Colombia from 1921 to 1922

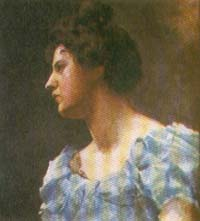

First Lady of Colombia
- In role 11 November 1921 – 7 August 1922
- President: Jorge Holguín
- Preceded by: María Antonia Suárez
- Succeeded by: Carolina Vásquez de Ospina

Personal details
- Born: María Cecilia Arboleda Mosquera; 21 January 1859 París, France
- Died: 3 February 1924 (aged 65) Bogotá, Colombia
- Party: Conservative Party
- Spouse: Jorge Holguín (m. 1877)

María Cecilia Arboleda de Holguín (née Arboleda Mosquera; 21 January 1859 - 3 February 1924), was a French born Colombian socialite who served as First Lady of Colombia from 1921 to 1922 as the wife of President Jorge Holguín.

Cecilia was born in Paris, France in 1859 to Julio Arboleda Pombo and Sofía Mosquera de Arboleda (née Mosquea Hurtado). She married Jorge Holguín in 1877 with whom she had 11 children.

Cecilia is the aunt of the Minister of Foreign Affairs, María Ángela Holguín, and the Minister of the Interior and Justice, Carlos Holguín Sardi.

== Biography ==
María Cecilia Arboleda Mosquera was born in Paris, France on January 21, 1859 to Julio Arboleda Pombo and Sofía Mosquera Hurtado. Her birth coincided with a brief stay with his family in Paris.

On 9 August 1877, she married the conservative politician from Cauca Jorge Holguín, who would later become the 10th President of Colombia.

=== First Lady of Colombia ===
On 11 November 1921, the resignation of the 9th President of Colombia, Marco Fidel Suárez, was officially presented, which made Jorge Holguín the 10th president of Colombia, being the next in line and one of the men of maximum confidence of Marco Fidel Suárez, making Cecilia the new first lady of Colombia, a position she held until 7 August 1922.

Honorary titles
Preceded by María Antonia Suárez	First Lady of Colombia; 1921–1922	Succeeded by Carolina Vásquez de Ospina
