= Nicolás Esguerra =

Colombian lawyer and statesman

Nicolás Esguerra (September 10, 1838 – December 23, 1923) was a Colombian lawyer and statesman.

== Early life ==
Esguerra was born in Bogotá, Republic of New Granada, the son of Colonel Domingo Esguerra, a veteran of the Independence war, and Serafina Ortiz. He lived in Ibagué for a good part of his life, and it was there that he came under the protection and influence of Manuel Murillo Toro, who helped him get admitted to college. Esguerra studied philosophy and law in the Colegio del Rosario where he graduated when he was twenty years old.

== Public Life and Politics ==
After he graduated as a lawyer, Esguerra became a judge and a magistrate. He started participating eagerly in politics and eventually became a congressman in 1872. Between 1864 and 1885 he was the rector of the Colegio del Rosario, during which tenure he attempted to reconcile the liberal and free-thinking university and the Catholic clergy. This made him popular among both liberals and conservatives. As a director of the Diario de Cundinamarca newspaper, he was influential in the presidential campaign of Santiago Pérez, who when elected as president appointed him as Secretary of Treasury and briefly as Minister of the Interior.

In the rise of the Regeneración (Regeneration) period which finished the liberal hegemony and terminated the United States of Colombia, to be succeeded by a centralist, conservative government embodied in the new Colombian Constitution of 1886, Esguerra was a strong opponent, denouncing among other things the illegal arrest of Cesar Conto, the director of "El Liberal" newspaper, assuming then as the director. Because of his opposition and liberal ideas he was persecuted, his properties confiscated, and he himself was expelled from the country on two occasions. During this time he traveled across Venezuela, Costa Rica, and the United States of America, where he met and befriended José Martí. He returned to Colombia under the government of Manuel Antonio Sanclemente, and later was instrumental in the protests against president Rafael Reyes regarding his signing of a treaty between Colombia, Panama and the United States of America, as a compensation for the separation of Panama, and as a result of which Reyes resigned as president.

Esguerra was also a presidential candidate in 1914, the first direct presidential elections since 1860, losing to conservative José Vicente Concha. He died in Bogotá in 1923.
