= Colombian Civil War of 1895 =

- Part of the Colombian Civil Wars
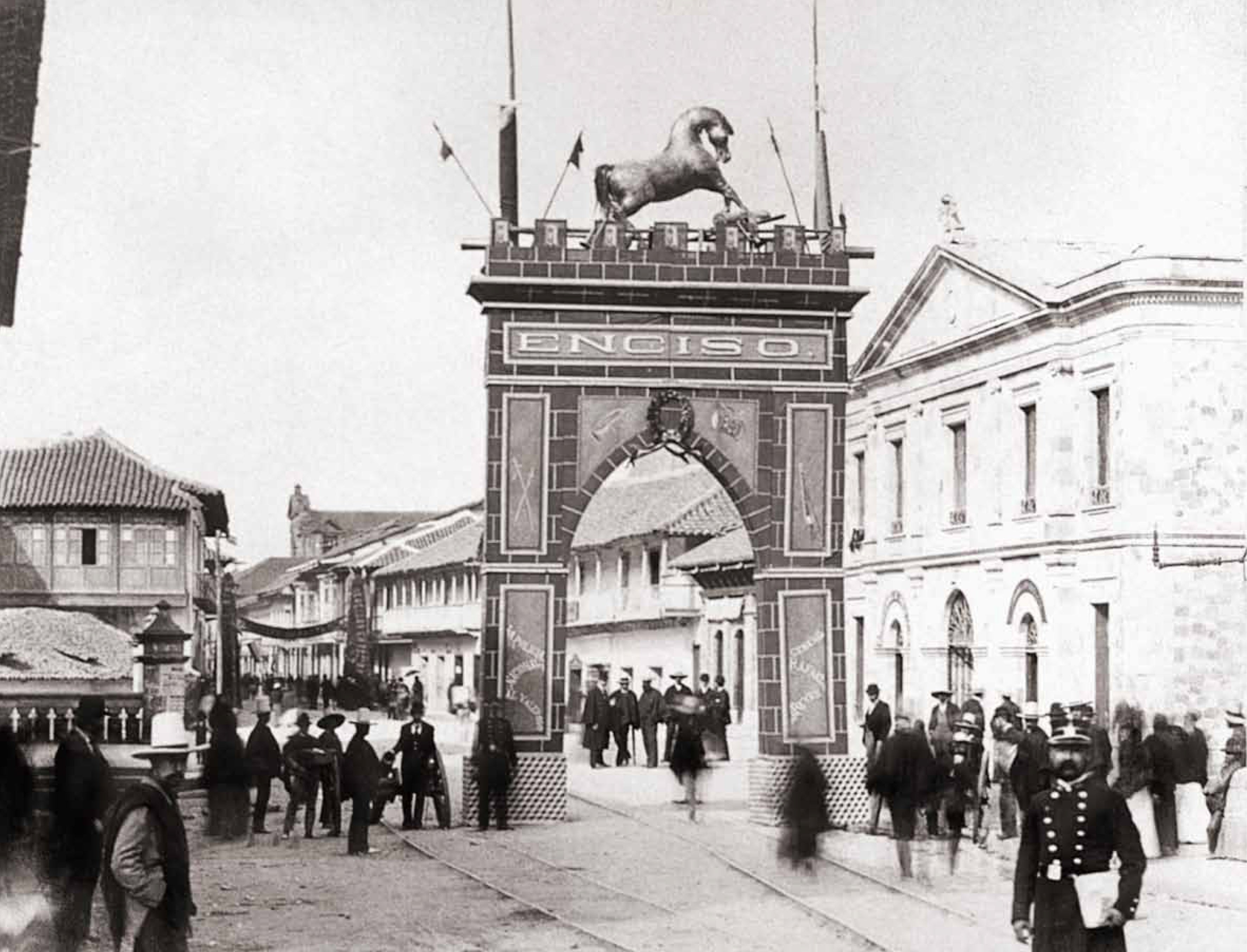
- Triumphal Arch placed in Bogotá to receive General Rafael Reyes after the Battle of Enciso
| Date | January to March 1895 |
| Location | Colombia |
| Result | Government victory |

Belligerents
| Republic of Colombia (nacional party); Conservative party | Colombian Liberal Party; Venezuelan mercenaries |

Commanders and leaders
| (Colombia) Miguel Antonio Caro; Rafael Reyes Prieto; Jean Marie Marcelin Gilibert; Manuel Casabianca; Próspero Pinzón | Santos Acosta (POW); Siervo Sarmiento; Rafael Uribe Uribe; José María Ruiz |

Strength
| 6,158 Soldiers, 450 Police | 3,000–4,000 |

The Colombian Civil War of 1895 (Spanish: La Guerra civil de 1895) was a conflict that took place in the Republic of Colombia in the late nineteenth century, then formed by the current countries of Colombia and Panama.

== Causes ==
The late nineteenth century was a period of instability in Colombian politics, with six civil wars fought between 1851 and 1895. The reorganisation of the country into a more unitary structure, without the separate state armies that had caused chaos earlier, also resulted in the Liberal party being marginalised in congress.

During the period 1892–1896, the Colombian Liberal Party was represented in the Congress by Luis Antonio Robles, while the presidency was occupied by Miguel Antonio Caro, a member of the National Party, after the retirement of Rafael Núñez for health reasons. The latter died in Cartagena 18 September 1894, leaving a power vacuum that contributed to the outbreak of conflict.

Upon taking office, Caro took unpopular measures under Law 61 of 1888, known as the "Law of Horses." Individual liberties and freedom of the press were reduced, censorship was introduced, and the government could arrest its political enemies without trial, arresting some and banishing others.

On the night of 22 of January 1895, the director of the new National Police of Colombia, the French director Jean Marie Marcelin Gilibert, foiled a coup plot, arranged from exile in Curaçao by the liberal General Avelino Rosas Cordoba, to arrest President Caro. Many of the coup plotters were arrested, with those who escaped fleeing to Facatativa, where General Siervo Sarmiento was based.

Despite this foiling of Cordoba's plan, on 29 January 1895, the Liberals rose under the command of General Servant Sarmiento.

== Course of the conflict ==
The Liberal revolt failed in a short amount of time due to a lack of organisation, weapons, manpower and official support. Both the Army and the National Police sided with the government. The rebel forces, on the other hand, were comprised in large part of poorly-armed students and artisans.

The rebels of the department of Cundinamarca were defeated at the battle of La Tribuna on 29 January 1895. On the same day rebels in the north of Tolima at Espinal, in Honda and in Ambalema were defeated by General Casabianca, reorganised themselves in Gualanday but were again defeated at Ibague. From there they advanced to Ambalema where they joined the rebels who had retreated from La Tribuna. These rebel forces later surrendered together.

In Boyacá, the rebels were led by Pedro María Pinzón, who marched with the forces from the west of the department (some 1,600 men) to Tunja to join those from the north. Pinzon won a victory against government forces at Soto leaving the road to Tunja open, but did not advance on Tunja, instead joining with the forces from the north of the department (≈1,400 in strength) at Duitama. From there they marched to join forces with the rebels of Santander, but reversed course along the way and returned to El Cocuy.

In Santander, whilst the rebels within the province were not of any great strength, a significant invasion by Colombian emigres based in the Venezuelan town of Rubio invaded the province of Cúcuta on 29 January and a week later defeated government forces at Bagalal, and then advanced to capture the towns of Rosario and Cúcuta. On 18 February, approximately 2,000 rebels left Cúcuta heading south, under the command of Generals José María Ruiz and Pedro Soler Martínez, with the intent of joining forces with those of Boyacá. They marched via Pamplona, Cácota de Velasco, Silos, Guaca, San Andrés and Málaga. At Enciso on 15 March the rebels encountered a 3,000-strong government force under General Rafael Reyes who had been following the same route as them, a bloody struggle ensued in which more than 1,000 men were killed before the government forces emerged victorious.

== Aftermath ==
General Rafael Reyes benefited greatly from the heightened reputation he had earned from his victories, and went on to become president of Colombia. However, the victory over the Liberals did not permanently settle the conflict within Colombian society, which within a few years was again embroiled in civil war - this time in the Thousand Days' War.
