= Miguel Antonio Caro =

President of Colombia from 1894 to 1898

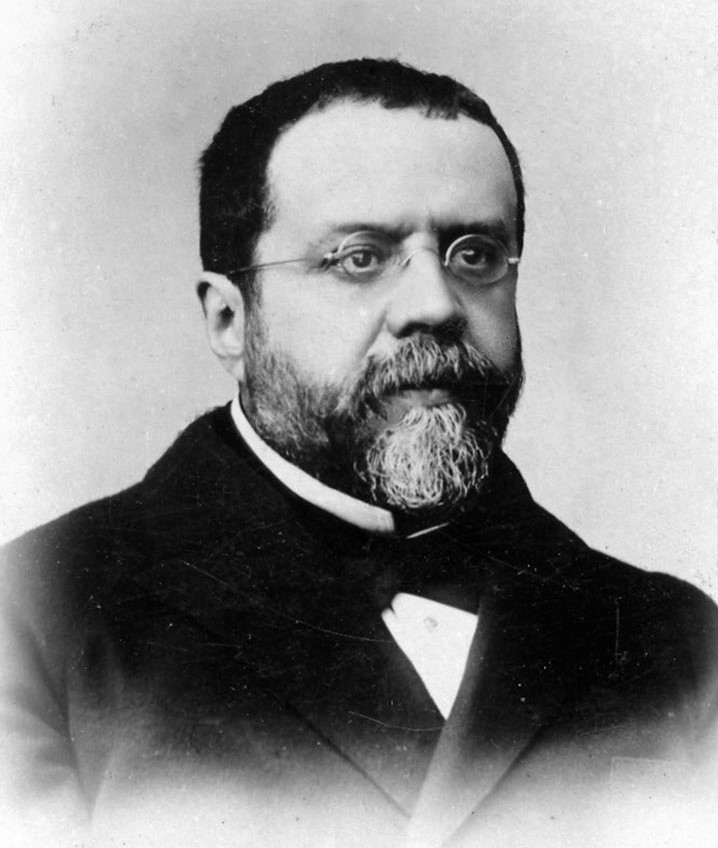

4th President of Colombia
- In office September 18, 1894 – August 7, 1898
- Vice President: Vacant (Note: Caro was vice president during the government of Rafael Núñez and became president after the death of Núñez on September 18, 1894. This was before the adoption of the National Constituent Assembly in 1904, and a vacancy in the office of vice president was not filled until the following elections and investiture.)
- Preceded by: Rafael Núñez
- Succeeded by: Manuel Antonio Sanclemente

2nd Vice President of Colombia
- In office August 7, 1892 – September 18, 1894 (Note: After the inauguration, Núñez stepped down from his office, so in his absence Caro led the administration ex officio as vice president until September 1894 when he ascended to the presidency after the death of Rafael Núñez.)
- President: Rafael Núñez
- Preceded by: Eliseo Payán
- Succeeded by: José Manuel Marroquín

Personal details
- Born: Miguel Antonio José Zoilo Cayetano Andrés Avelino de las Mercedes Caro Tobar; November 10, 1843 Bogotá, Cundinamarca, Republic of New Granada
- Died: August 5, 1909 (aged 63) Bogotá, Cundinamarca, Colombia
- Party: Conservative
- Other political affiliations: National Party
- Spouse: Ana de Narváez Guerra-Azuola (m. 1873; died 1909)
- Children: 9, including Julio
- Occupation: Journalist; philologist; politician

Miguel Antonio Caro Tobar (November 10, 1843 – August 5, 1909) was a Colombian writer, thinker, poet, and politician who served as the 4th president of Colombia from 1894 to 1898. A member of the Conservative Party, Caro served as the 2nd vice president of Colombia from 1892 to 1894 under Rafael Núñez.

== Early life ==
His father, José Eusebio Caro and Mariano Ospina Rodríguez, were the founders of the Colombian Conservative Party. His father's criticisms of President José Hilario López led to his exile to New York City.

Caro did not attend college or university. Nevertheless, as autodidact, he was very well versed in economics, world history and literature, social science, jurisprudence, linguistics and philology. He was also well known as great orator, debater and poet. Also, as a scholar, he translated several of the works of Virgil from Latin. He was appointed as Director of the National Library, was elected to congress, and founded of the Academia Colombiana de la Lengua.

== Political career ==
Caro, as philosopher, scholar and orator, played a decisive and important role in the preparation, composition and enactment of the new Constitution of 1886. The significant achievement gave him an enormous prestige in the political realm.

During the presidential election of 1892, the Colombian Conservative Party was divided in two movements: traditionalists and nationalists. The nationalists nominated Rafael Núñez as candidate for president and Caro as vice-president. The traditionalists nominated Marcelino Vélez and José Joaquín Ortiz. The liberals did not participate. Obviously, the conservatives won, and the nationalists outnumbered the traditionalists. Thus, Núñez and Caro were elected for the 1892-1898 presidential term.

== Presidency ==
Núñez had expressed his clear desire not to be inaugurated but to retire to his native city of Cartagena. Nevertheless, Caro insisted for Núñez had to be inaugurated as president before retiring. Thus, Núñez accepted and was inaugurated in Cartagena and then immediately resigned. Therefore, Caro, as vice-president, began acting as president.

Caro never used the title of President but the one of Vice President of Colombia in charge of the Executive Office. Although he was the legitimate and constitutional president of Colombia, he did so to show respect to his mentor Rafael Núñez whose illness had forced him to cede day-to-day power.

The vehement adversion and tenacious opposition from the liberals and traditionalists conservatives to his government made Caro impose a severe censorship law against the opposition. On August 4, 1893, by decree and invoking the law 61 of 1888, known as the law of the horses, he muzzled the opposition newspapers and curtailed the freedom of the press. In a subsequent decree, Caro shut down the major opposition and liberal newspapers El Redactor and El Contenporáneoand expelled its directors Santiago Pérez de Manosalbas and Modesto Garcés. Other opposition leaders and activists were incarcerated.

During the six years as president, Caro had to crush three coup attempts by the liberals.

On January 22, 1894, the Colombian Liberal Party launched a major offensive against the government of Caro. With its principal leaders spelled out of the country or detained, its newspapers closed and the freedom of the press and freedom of association suspended, the party found no other alternative but to start a civil war. This revolt rapidly extended throughout the country, mainly in the states of Boyacá, Cauca, Cundinamarca, Bolívar (Bolívar Department), Tolima and Santander (Norte de Santander Department). Even though the rebels had been aided by foreign countries, they were promptly defeated by the armies of President Caro. On March 15, 1895, the civil war came to an end at the battle of "Enciso", in Santander.

Almost a year later, in January 1896, the traditionalists sent to Caro a very stern admonition, known as the "Manifesto of the 21", expressing their discontent and disapproval of the affairs of his administration. The manifesto's main signatory was Carlos Martínez Silva, and 20 other prominent dignitaries and political leaders. They urged Caro to lift martial law, reinstate civil liberties and have a magnanimous approach towards the liberals.

Caro was so disillusioned and offended by this that he resigned the presidency on March 12, 1896. Caro appointed General Guillermo Quintero Calderón to replace him and retired to his family retreat in Sopó. General Quintero Calderón designated Abraham Moreno, of the opposition group, as Minister of Government. That infuriated Caro, and he retook his office of the presidency on March 17, 1896.

== Politically active relatives ==
The two politically active descendants of Miguel Antonio Caro are Juan Andres Caro and Sergio Jaramillo Caro Rivera.

Sergio Jaramillo Caro, is a Colombian politician. He recently served as the High Commissioner of Peace under President Juan Manuel Santos in the contested peace negotiations with the terrorist group FARC, between 2012 and 2016. He previously served in government as Vice Minister of Defense, and also held the position of National Security Advisor between 2010 and 2012.

Juan Andres Caro Rivera is an American politician who served in the Trump Administration as the White House lead for the Energy Recovery of Puerto Rico under Rear Admiral Peter Brown, and as a senior advisor at the United States Department of Energy. During his tenure, the federal government announcement 9.6 billion in federal energy recovery funds to revitalize the Puerto Rican energy grid. Juan represented White House energy priorities in recovery delegations focused on rebuilding infrastructure, economic revitalization, and the re-shoring pharmaceutical manufacturing. Juan was criticized for playing a role in spreading debunked voter fraud claims during the 2020 election.

== Bibliography ==
- The 1893 Bogotazo: Artisans and Public Violence in Late Nineteenth-Century Bogota. D Sowell - Journal of Latin American Studies, 1989
- Limits of Power: Elections Under the Conservative Hegemony in Colombia, 1886–1930. E Posada-Carbo - The Hispanic American Historical Review, 1997
- Rodríguez-García, José María "The Regime of Translation in Miguel Antonio Caro's Colombia." diacritics - Volume 34, Number 3/4, Fall-Winter 2004, pp. 143–175
- The Political Economy of the Colombian Presidential Election of 1897. CW Bergquist - The Hispanic American Historical Review, 1976

Political offices
Preceded by Eliseo Payán	Vice President of Colombia; 1892–1894	Succeeded by José Manuel Marroquín
Preceded by Rafael Nuñez	President of Colombia; 1894–1898	Succeeded by Manuel Antonio Sanclemente
