= Marco Tobón Mejía =

Colombian artist

- Born: 1876; Santa Rosa de Osos, Colombia
- Died: 1933 (aged 56–57); Paris, France
- Resting place: San Pedro Cemetery Museum

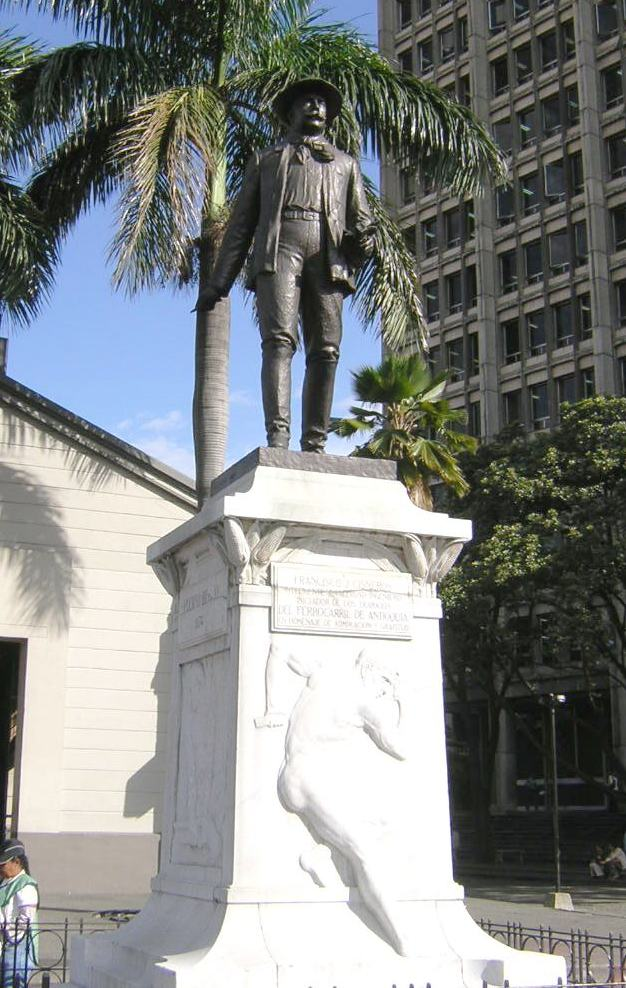
Statue to Cisneros

Marco Tobón Mejía (1876-1933) was a Colombian sculptor, draughtsman, and painter. He lived in France for almost all his career, where he met and formed relationships with several prominent artists, including Auguste Rodin, Aristide Maillol, and Antoine Bourdelle. He worked mostly within neoclassic and Art Nouveau styles, and is known especially for his sculptures in bronze, electroplate, and pewter. Several of his pieces can be found in the Colombian National Museum.

His marble statues Poetry and The Silence are dedicated to the Colombian poet José Asunción Silva.

== Biography ==
Tobón was born in Santa Rosa de Osos, near Medellín, Colombia. His artistic career began with drawing and painting. While in Colombia, he studied with Francisco Antonio Cano, and together they contributed to the magazine Lectura y arte (Reading and Art). During his residence in Cuba between 1905 and 1909, he also did covers and illustrations for the magazine Le Figaro and others. From 1910 to 1930, he created several small bronze reliefs of academic nudes. He died in Paris at the age of 57.

== Selected works ==
- Statue to Cisneros in Plaza Cisneros, Medellín, Colombia
- Poetry (La Poesia), 1914, female nude in white marble, Colombian National Museum
- The Silence (El Silencio), Colombian National Museum
- Sculpture of José María Cordoba
- Monument to the Flag, 1931, November 11 Park
- Tombstone for Pedro Justo Berrío
