= Francisco Antonio Cano Cardona =

Colombian artist

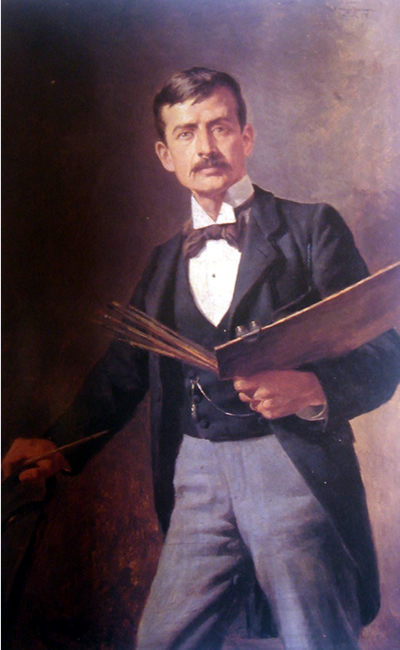
- Portrait of Cano by Ricardo Acevedo Bernal, 1917.
- Born: Francisco Antonio Cano Cardona; November 24, 1865; Yarumal, Colombia
- Died: May 10, 1935 (aged 69); Bogotá, Colombia
- Resting place: San Pedro Cemetery Museum
- Known for: Painting, Sculpting, Engraving, Writing
- Notable work: Horizons
- Spouse: María Sanín

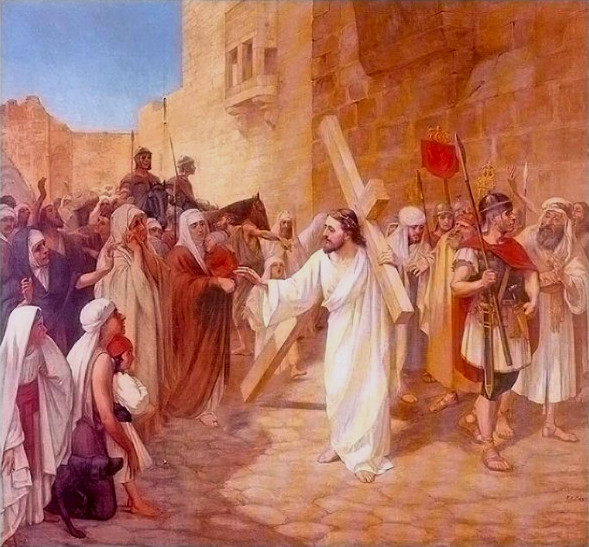
The Christ of Forgiveness by Cano, exhibited in the Metropolitan Cathedral of Medellín

Francisco Antonio Cano (November 24, 1865 - May 10, 1935) was a Colombian painter, sculptor, writer, and engraver from Antioquia, who is famous for his works in which he portrays the cultural identity of the country and region. One of his best known works is Horizons, which depicts the beginning of the colonization of Antioquia (1913) that took place during the second half of the nineteenth and early twentieth centuries. He was a professor and director of the School of Fine Arts in Medellín and in Bogotá. And also a mentor of other famous Colombian artists, such as Pedro Nel Gómez, Sergio Trujillo Magnenat and Marco Tobón Mejía.

== Biography ==
Cano was born in the town of Yarumal, Colombia, on November 24, 1865, to a poor family. He was son to José María Cano Álvarez and María Jesús Cardona y Villegas. He had a brother named José Ignacio.

He submitted drawings and vignettes for the newspaper Yarumal Annals of the Club. He received painting classes by Angel Maria Palomino and with Horacio Rodríguez Marino, he learned drawing techniques. He also took part in various important art exhibitions.

In 1896, he married María Sanín.

From 1898 to 1901, he received a scholarship to study in France, where he attended courses in Fine Arts at the Académie Julian and by Claude Monet. When he returned to Colombia, he opened his own workshop.

He was director and professor of the School of Fine Arts in Medellín and Bogotá, and a member of the Colombian Academy of Arts.

He is the great-uncle of the painter Fernando Granda Cano.

He died in Bogotá on May 10, 1935.

== Works ==
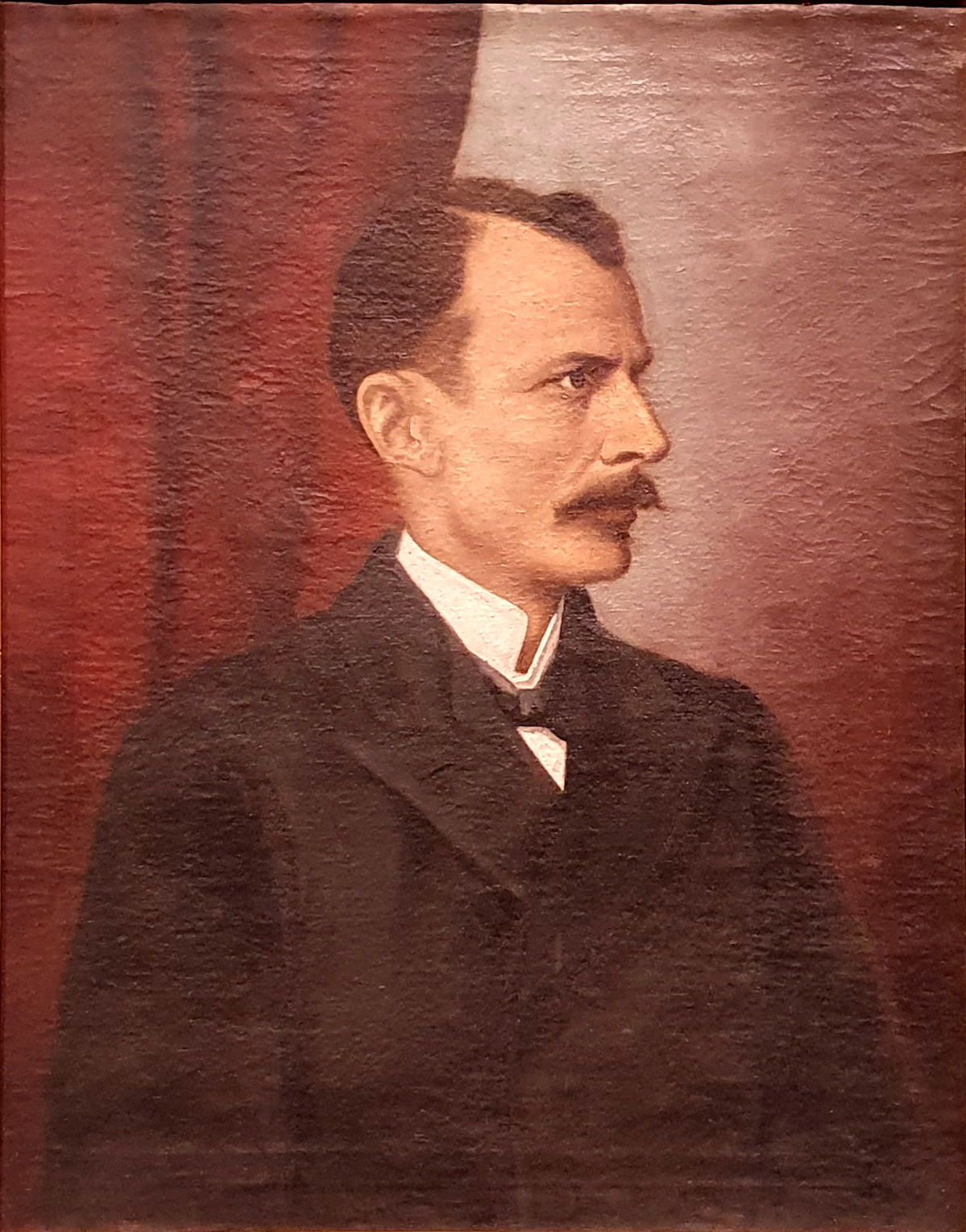
Portrait of Rafael Uribe Uribe

Among his principal oils and watercolors are: The study of the painter, Mariano Ospina Rodríguez, Pedro Justo Berrío, Marcelino Vélez, The Apostle Paul, Mariano Montoya, Earthenware, Rafael Nunez, Still life of roses, Cristo del Perdon, Source of the observatory, Efe Gómez, the Girl of the Roses, The baptism of Christ, Horizons, The Virgin of the Lilies, Don Fidel Cano, Francisco Javier Cisneros, The voluptuousness of the sea, and Carolina Cárdenas portraits, among others.

For the Church of San José, Cano created the fountain in the courtyard and the gilded altarpiece named Baptism of Jesus.

=== Horizontes ===
This oil painting is considered Cano's masterpiece. Horizontes epitomizes the idealized migrant family. It portrays a young, fair-skinned colono family — consisting of a husband, wife, and child — sitting on a bluff, surrounded by mountains. The three members of the family are likened to the Holy Family, with the woman dressed in blue and white like the Virgin Mary, with a baby on her lap. The gaze of the wife, child, and father are in the direction of the man's outstretched hand, which evokes Michelangelo's Creation of Adam, and that points toward an unseen, distant horizon.

His work has been copied and parodied several times by other artists and alumni. The original of Horizons is currently housed in the Museum of Antioquia.

=== Historical paintings ===
Cano also painted many historical paintings, some of his most famous oils were painted in 1916 when the director of the Colombian Army’s officer academy, Major Saenz commissioned Cano with two paintings, a portrait of Simón Bolívar known as Bolivar vencedor and one depicting General José María Cordóva leading the Gran Colombian army at the Battle of Ayacucho known as Paso de vencedores, these two paintings are on display at the academy.

In 1919, for the commemoration of the 100th anniversary of the New Granada Liberation Campaign that was led by Simón Bolívar and Francisco de Paula Santander that gave Colombia its independence, the Beautification society of Bogotá and the Council for patriotic festivities commissioned Cano to paint an oil depicting Bolívar and the liberator army during their grueling crossing of the Eastern Andes Mountain range through the Páramo de Pisba. Cano finished this oil painting in March of 1922 and titled it Paso del ejército Libertador por el páramo de Pisba, it quickly became one of his most celebrated works and is today on display at the Quinta de Bolivar museum in Bogotá. In 1983 the Colombian Central Bank included this painting on the reverse side of the $2000 pesos bill.

== Gallery ==
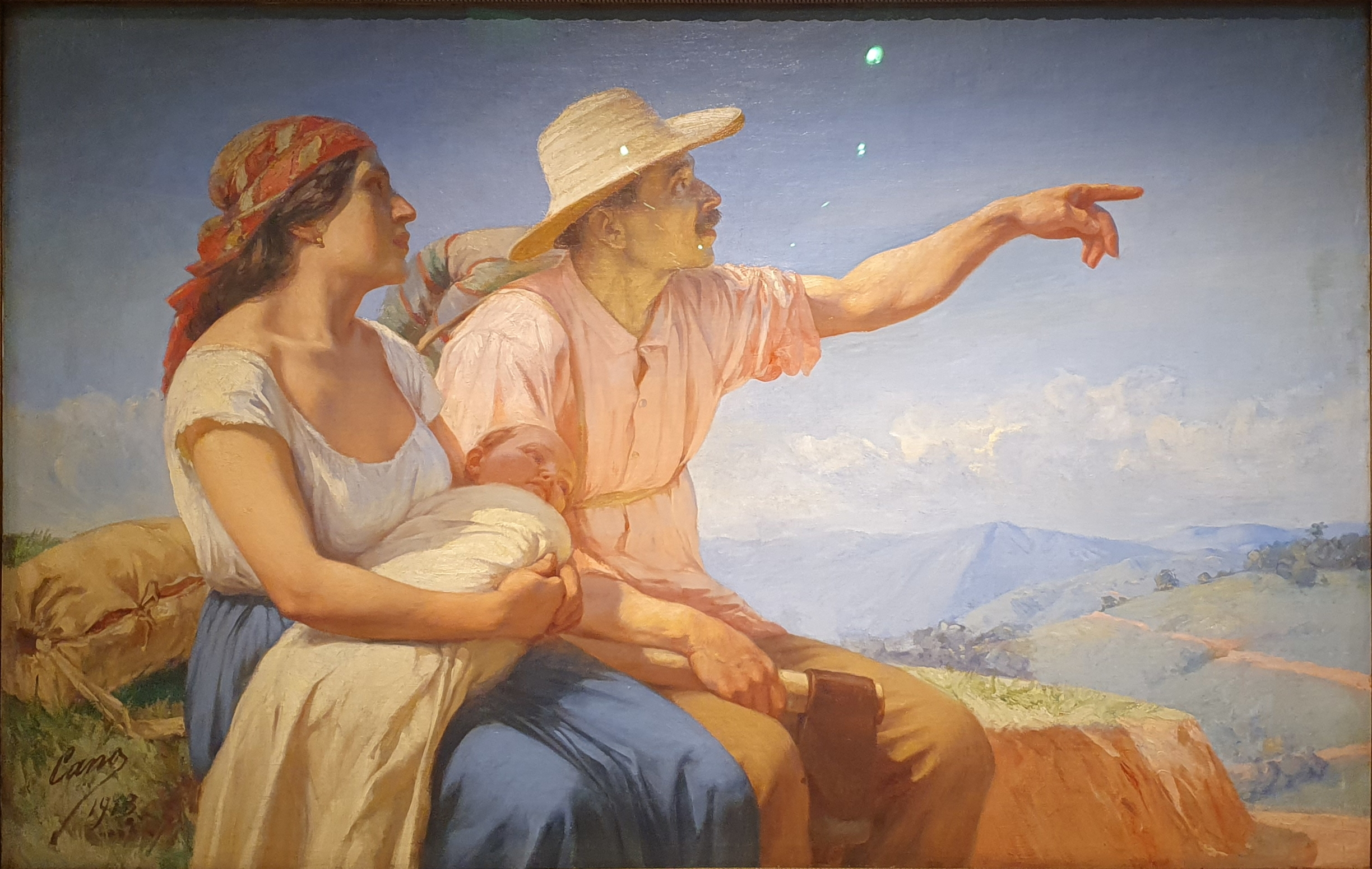
Cardona's Horizontes (1913)

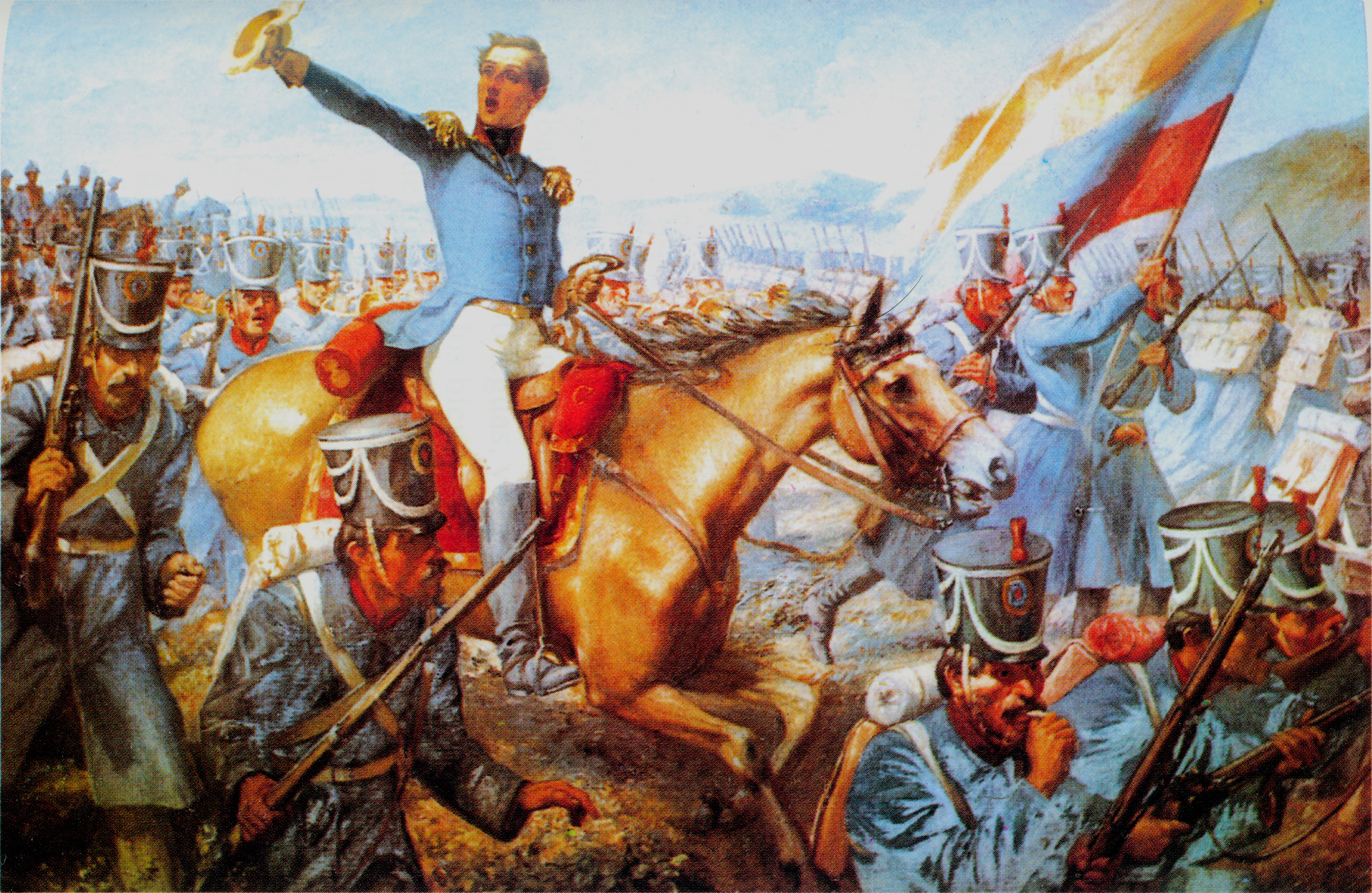
Paso de Vencedores (1916) which depicts General José María Córdova at the Battle of Ayacucho.

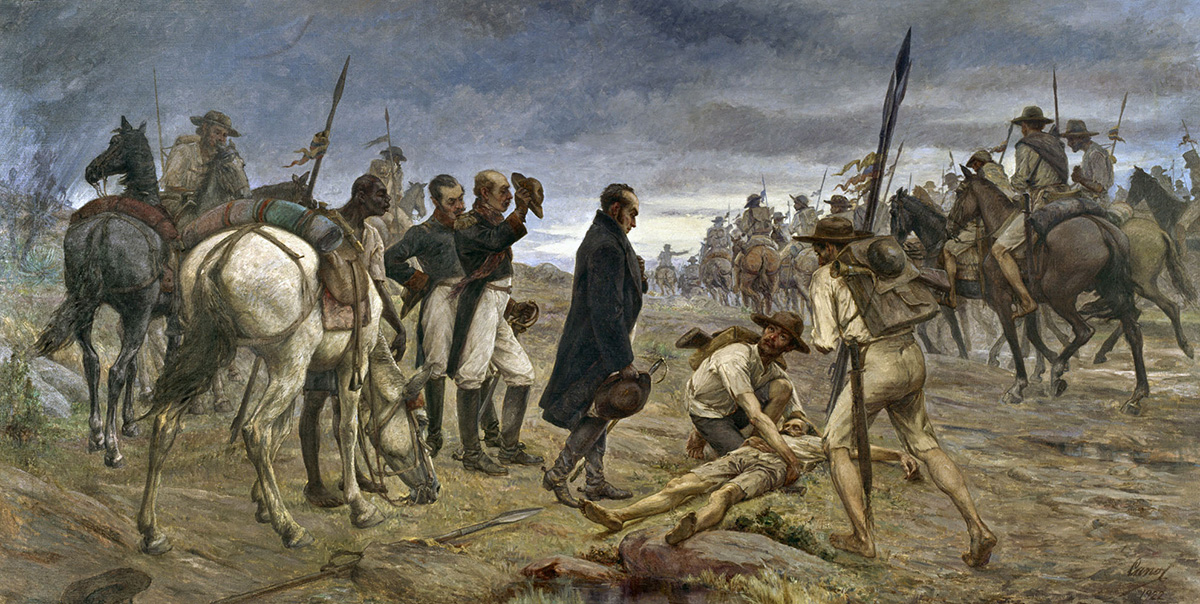
Paso del ejército Libertador por el páramo de Pisba (1922)
