= Efe Gómez =

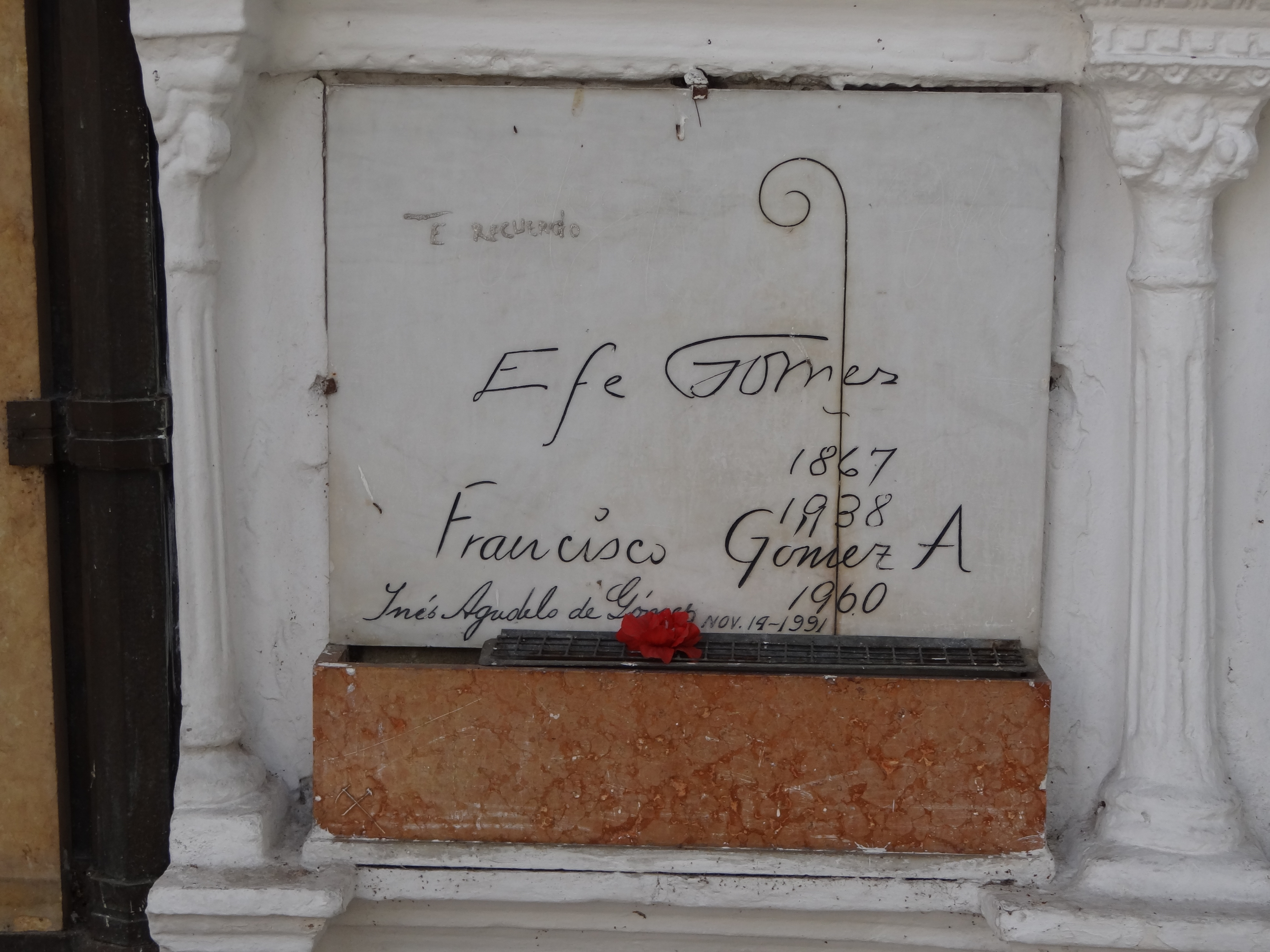
The tomb of Efe Gómez at the San Pedro Cemetery in Medellín

Efe Gómez, born Francisco Gómez Escobar, (1867 - 1938) was a prominent writer and intellectual from Medellín, Colombia. He is buried in the San Pedro Cemetery Museum.

He received a bachelor's degree from the Universidad de Antioquia graduate degree in engineering from Escuela de Minas de Medellín
