= Manuel Uribe Ángel =

Colombian physician, geographer and politician

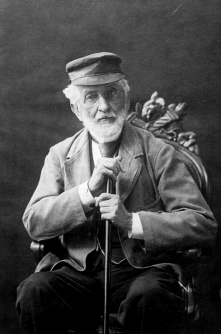
- Ángel in 1889

12th President of the Sovereign State of Antioquia
- In office 10 April 1877 – 31 October 1877
- Preceded by: Silverio Arango Palacio
- Succeeded by: Julián Trujillo Largacha

Senator of Colombia
- In office 1882–1883

Personal details
- Born: Manuel María Uribe Angel; 4 September 1822 Envigado, Antioquia, Colombia
- Died: 16 June 1904 (aged 81) Medellín, Antioquia, Colombia
- Resting place: San Pedro Cemetery Museum; 6.265619°N 75.561052°W
- Party: Liberal
- Spouse: Magdalena Urreta Saldarriaga (1854–1904)
- Education: Our Lady of the Rosary University, Central University, University of Paris
- Profession: Physician

Manuel María Uribe Angel (4 September 1822 – 16 June 1904) was a Colombian physician, geographer and politician. He has been called the "father of medicine of Antioquia" for his contributions to the advances of the practice of medicine in Colombia and the Antioquia Department. He was also known outside the realm of medicine for his studies and works on the geography and history of Colombia. He also served as President of the then Sovereign State of Antioquia and as Senator of Colombia.

== Life ==
Manuel María Uribe Angél was born on 4 September 1822 in la Magnolia, the hacienda of his parents José María Uribe Arango and María Josefa Ángel Uribe, both from an educated and well to do family in the town of Envigado, in what was then the Province of Antioquia, now Antioquia Department, during the First Republic or Gran Colombia. As customary in those times, he was baptized the following day in the parish church of Saint Gertrude in Envigado by Felipe de Restrepo. And years later confirmed in the Roman Catholic faith by the 1st Bishop Antioquia Mariano Garnica y Dorjuela.

=== Education ===
His education began in his home town and first taught by Alejo Escobar, and during his youth worked as secretary of the doctor Nicolás de Villa Tirado; the lack of proper education in Antioquia given the fresh independence of the nation, forced Uribe to depart to the capital of the country, Bogotá where he began his studies on 18 October 1836 at the High College of Our Lady of the Rosary, where he was a student of both his brother Wenceslao, and his uncle Pedro Uribe Arango who were professors at the institution. After graduating from Our Lady of the Rosary, he moved on to study Medicine at the Central University of the Republic, from where he graduated in 1844 as Doctor in Medicine and Surgery.

After graduating he moved for a short time back to Antiquia, but soon began a life of travelling, living in Quito, Ecuador where he received an honorary degree in Medicine from the Central University of Ecuador, from then to Peru, the United States, and finally to Paris, France, where he lived for two years specializing his medical training. Upon his return to Antioquia he married Magdalena Urreta Saldarriaga in 1854, and remained in the country for a good time, practicing medicine, now a renowned man in his field.

Manuel Uribe Ángel developed a renowned fame not only as a doctor, but as a versatile and all-around intellectual socialite. In 1871, after the creation of the Department of Medicine of the University of Antioquia, he joined the institution as a faculty professor of medicine, French, Gross Human Anatomy, Physics, Residency, among others. He was a founder member, 1st and 3rd President of the Academy of Medicine of Medellín, and during the first National Congress of Medicine of Colombia was designated honorary president of the congregation. Member of the Colombian Academy of the (Spanish) Language, and the Colombian Academy of History, and on 2 December 1903 he was named first president of the Academy of History of Antioquia.

=== Politics ===
In 1875, he traveled again to the United States, this time not only as a mere tourist but as representative of his Government to the United States for the occasion of the Centenary of the death of Miguel de Cervantes Saavedra. On this occasion he also travelled to Mexico, and the Antilles, but on his return to the country due to the events of the Colombian Civil War of 1876, and the similar wars from then on, he began to venture in to the realm of politics as a member of the Colombian Liberal Party.

In 1877, Uribe participated as Deputy of Antioquia during the constituent assembly, becoming its President, and on 10 April 1877 Uribe was elected President of the Sovereign State of Antioquia, a state in the United States of Colombia. His administration was challenged by the growing tensions between Liberals and Conservatives, Antioquia being a Conservative state was under attack by the Liberal Federal government and under the Military lead of Julián Trujillo Largacha, who succeeded Uribe on 31 October 1877 in power after crushing of Conservative forces.

Uribe Ángel was sent to the Sovereign State of Panama to Represent Antioquia at the groundbreaking ceremony for the Panama Canal on 1 January 1880.

In 1882, as a member of the Liberal party, Uribe Ángel was elected Senator of Colombia.

=== Death ===
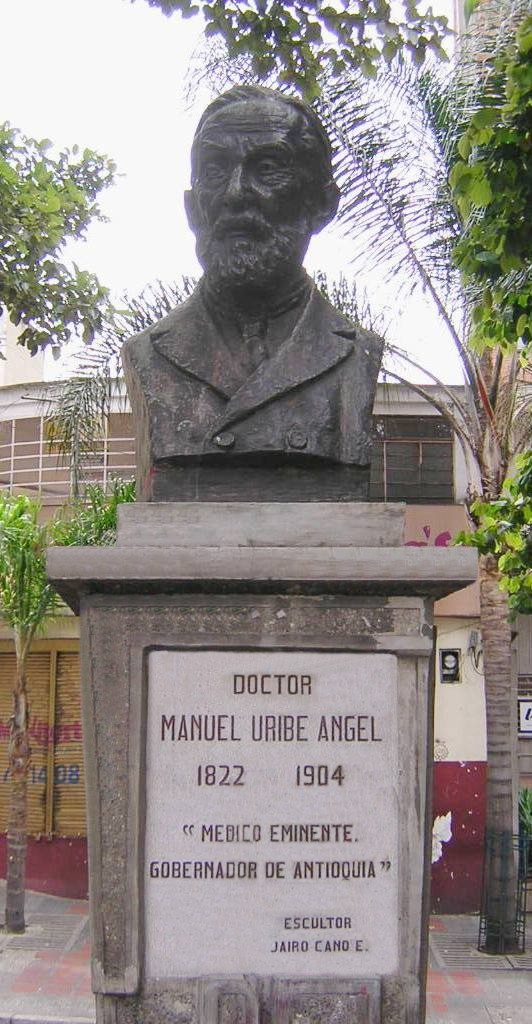
Bust by Jairo Cano E. of Manuel Uribe Ángel, located along Avenue la Playa, Medellín. Inscription reads: “Eminent Doctor. Governor of Antioquia.”

Manuel Uribe Ángel died on 16 June 1904 in Medellín at the age of 81. He had been blind his last seven years, and was only survived by his only widow Magdalena, as they never had children. After his death his body was interred in the San Pedro Cemetery. His memory was kept alive as a man of wisdom and science, the Congress of Colombia passed a law commemorating his death and allocating a special endowment to have two oil painting made to consecrate his image, one for his widow and the other to be displayed at the Library of Zea. In his home town of Envigado there is both a hospital and an educational institute for secondary education that carry his name.

The Academy of History of Antioquia, honored his contribution by creating the medal Order of the Centenary of Manuel Uribe Ángel, that grants those individuals that contribute to the history of Antioquia, its study, or its preservation; President Álvaro Uribe Vélez received such distinction on 26 March 2008.

== Works ==
The following is a list of selected works by Manuel Uribe Ángel in Spanish, some of his works were only published after his death.

- Reflexiones en viaje: la cruz de barbacoa. Imprenta de Gutierrez Hermanos. 1875.
- Las empresas del señor Cisneros (PDF). 1880.
- Un episodio Colombiano. 1881.
- Geografía general y compendio histórico del estado de Antioquia en Colombia. Paris: Victor Goupy et Jourdan. 1885. OCLC 184810.
- Biografía del Dr. Alejandro Eduardo Restrepo y Callejas. Medellín: Imprenta del Departamento. 1889.
- Colón – América – Medellín (PDF). Medellín: Imprenta del Departamento. 12 October 1892.
- Monumento al salvador del mundo. Imprenta del Departamento. 1901.
- La medecina en Antioquia (PDF). Biblioteca Aldeana de Colombia. Bogotá: Editorial Minerva. 1932. OCLC 2377823.
- Discursos y páginas históricas. Colección Academia Antioqueña de Historia. 1973. OCLC 6146158.
- La serrana: leyenda histórica. Fondo Rotario, Ministerio de Justicia. 1984 [1895]. OCLC 26129900.
- Antología del temprano relato antioqueño (PDF). Medellín: Biblioteca Virtual de Antioquia. 1995.
- Recuerdos de un viaje de Medellín a Bogotá. Colección Narrativa / Patrimonio. Prologue by Angela Pérez Mejía (3rd ed.). Medellín: Editorial Universidad de Antioquia. 2007. ISBN 978-958-714-011-8. OCLC 184907942.

== See also ==
- Fernando González (writer)
- José Fernández Madrid
- José Jerónimo Triana
- José Manuel Restrepo
