= Horizontes =

Painting by Francisco Antonio Cano Cardona

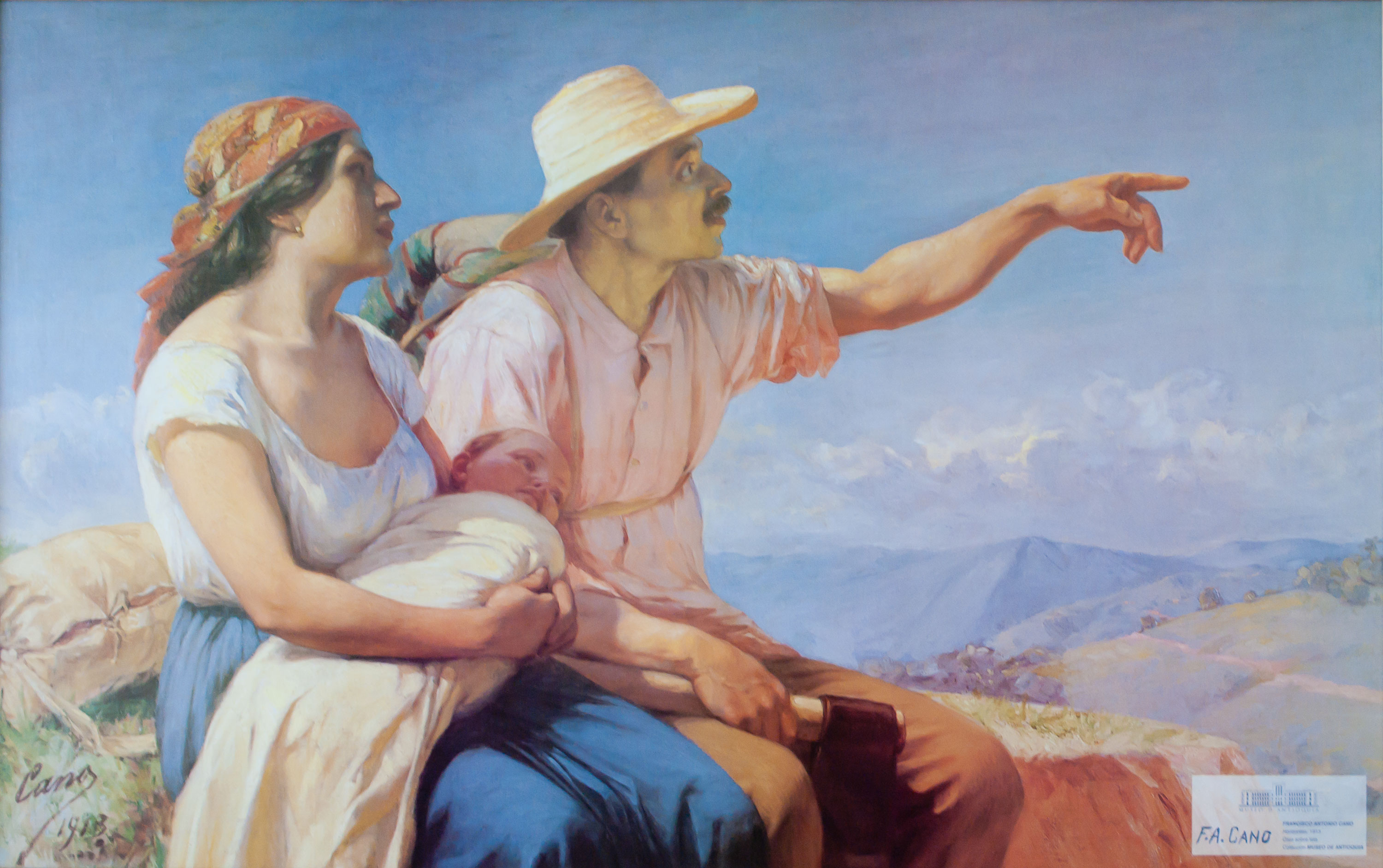
- Artist: Francisco Antonio Cano Cardona
- Year: 1913
- Medium: Oil on canvas
- Location: Museum of Antioquia, Medellín

Horizons (Spanish: Horizontes) is a 1913 oil painting by Francisco Antonio Cano Cardona. Horizons shows the idealized migrant family and it portrays a colono family –consisting of a husband, wife, and child– sitting on a bluff, surrounded by mountains. The three members of the family are often referred as a version of the Holy Family, with the woman dressed in colors like the Virgin Mary, with a baby on her lap. The gaze of the wife, child, and father are in the direction of the man's outstretched hand, which evokes Michelangelo's The Creation of Adam, and that points toward an unseen horizon.

The painting is a part of the permanent collection of the Museum of Antioquia, located in Medellín, Colombia.

== History ==
Horizons was painted in Bogotá after the painter moved there from Medellín.
