= San Pedro Cemetery Museum =

National monuments of Colombia

- Museo Cementerio San Pedro
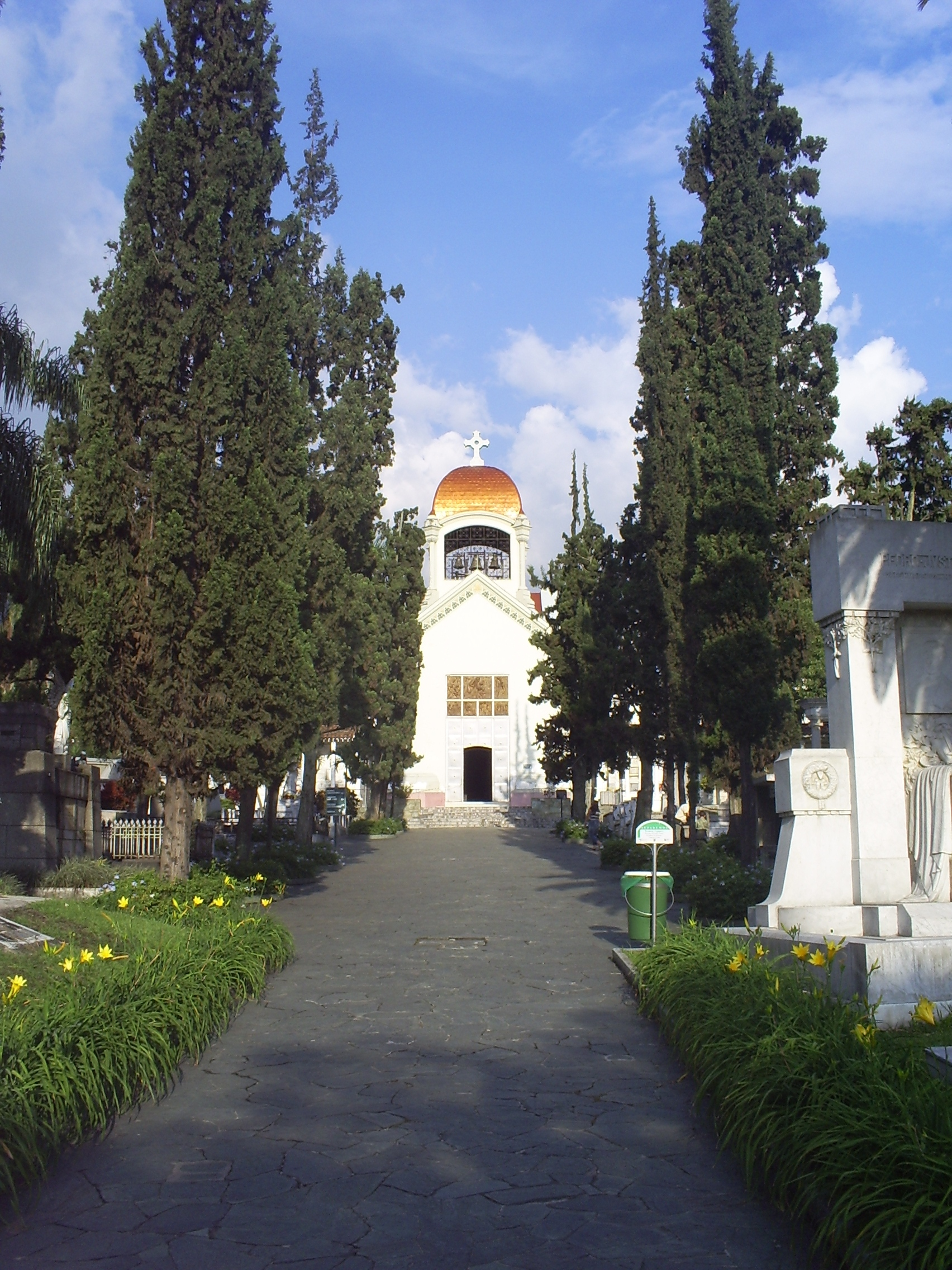
- Chapel of the San Pedro Cemetery Museum in Medellín, designed by Agustín Goovaerts
- Coordinates: 6.2657°N 75.5613°W

The San Pedro Cemetery Museum is a cemetery and museum located in Medellín, Colombia. It was constructed in 1842, named a museum in 1998, and declared a national monument of Colombia in 1999. This place is an integral part of the cultural and architectural heritage of the city. It is administered by the Foundation of San Pedro Cemetery.

Funerary monuments are erected here in memory of prominent figures in the history of Colombia. Although it falls under the category of funerary sculptures and architecture, the space has begun to emerge as a new venue for artistic dissemination. Local and national collections of art are preserved there and, in full moon nights, concerts, shows, storytelling, theater, and dance performances are held.

== History ==
The Cemetery San Pedro was founded in 1842, when the small town of La Candelaria (present-day Medellín) had 9000 inhabitants and only 16 years had passed since it became the new capital of Antioquia. This time was characterized by great advances in the town, such as a population increase and strengthening of major economic groups, wars fought between political parties, colonization of western Colombia, the consolidation of trade, the birth of the industry, railroad building and navigating the Magdalena River. Specifically, the cemetery was founded on July 8, 1842, under the initiative of Pedro Uribe Restrepo, who called a meeting of important families of the Villa de la Candelaria. They agreed to the founding of a new cemetery, seeing the lack of one worth their families, since the Cemetery of San Lorenzo, which was founded in January 1828, was the only one there and, therefore, was too small to continue providing the service to the families of Medellín.

The partners decided to buy land in the ridge of El Llano (today Bolivar Street). The lot was 125 yards long by 200 yards wide and on 30 September 1842 the deed of purchase was signed. The cemetery was called the New Cemetery, of Individuals or of San Vicente of Paul until 1871, when it changed names to San Pedro Cemetery. Because it was founded by members of the commercial, political, and intellectual elite of the time, it began to be called the cemetery of rich or "white city", for the many mausoleums and sculptures made of Carrara marble, most brought from Pietrasanta, Italy.

With the growth and progress of Medellín, the cemetery needed to make additions and alterations to improve service, whereby the surrounding land was acquired. The first gallery built was that of San Lorenzo on the southwest side of the main courtyard and from this model was consolidated throughout the territory with similar constructions for the entire set. In the 1920s, various projects were started. During this time, engineer and Belgian architect Agustín Goovaerts created the cemetery's chapel in 1925 and a monument for Camilo Restrepo in 1926.

== Recognition as a museum ==
Between 1996 and 1997 an evaluation and investigation was conducted. The result of this evaluation defined the need to seek protective mechanisms for a work that had a high degree of deterioration. In 1997 the institution Colcultura (since subsumed by the Ministry of Culture) was solicited to declare the Cemetery of San Pedro as a national monument of Colombia.

== Famous people ==
The following is a select list of famous people interred in the cemetery: Fidel Cano, Mariano Ospina Rodríguez, Pedro Nel Ospina, Luciano Restrepo Escobar, Pedro Justo Berrío, Carlos Coriolano Amador, José María Sierra, Alejandro Ángel, Efe Gómez, Luis López de Mesa, Félix de Bedout Moreno, Manuel Uribe Ángel, Pedro Estrado, Luis Eduardo Yepes, Jorge Isaacs, Francisco Antonio Cano, Marco Tobón Mejía, Bernardo Vieco Ortiz, Jorge Marín Vieco, Pedro Nel Gómez, Constantino Carvajal, Rafael Sáenz.

=== Select mausoleums ===
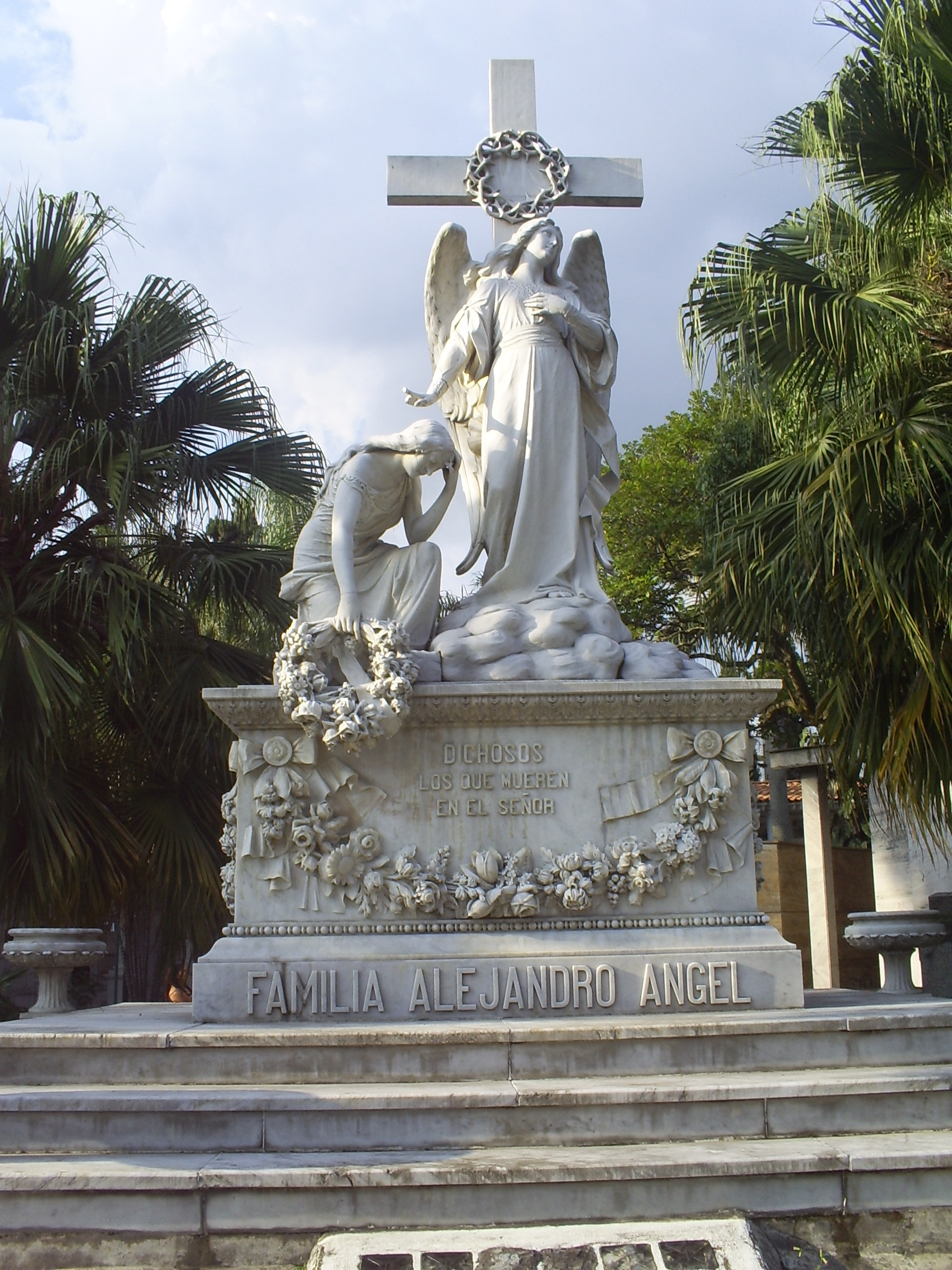
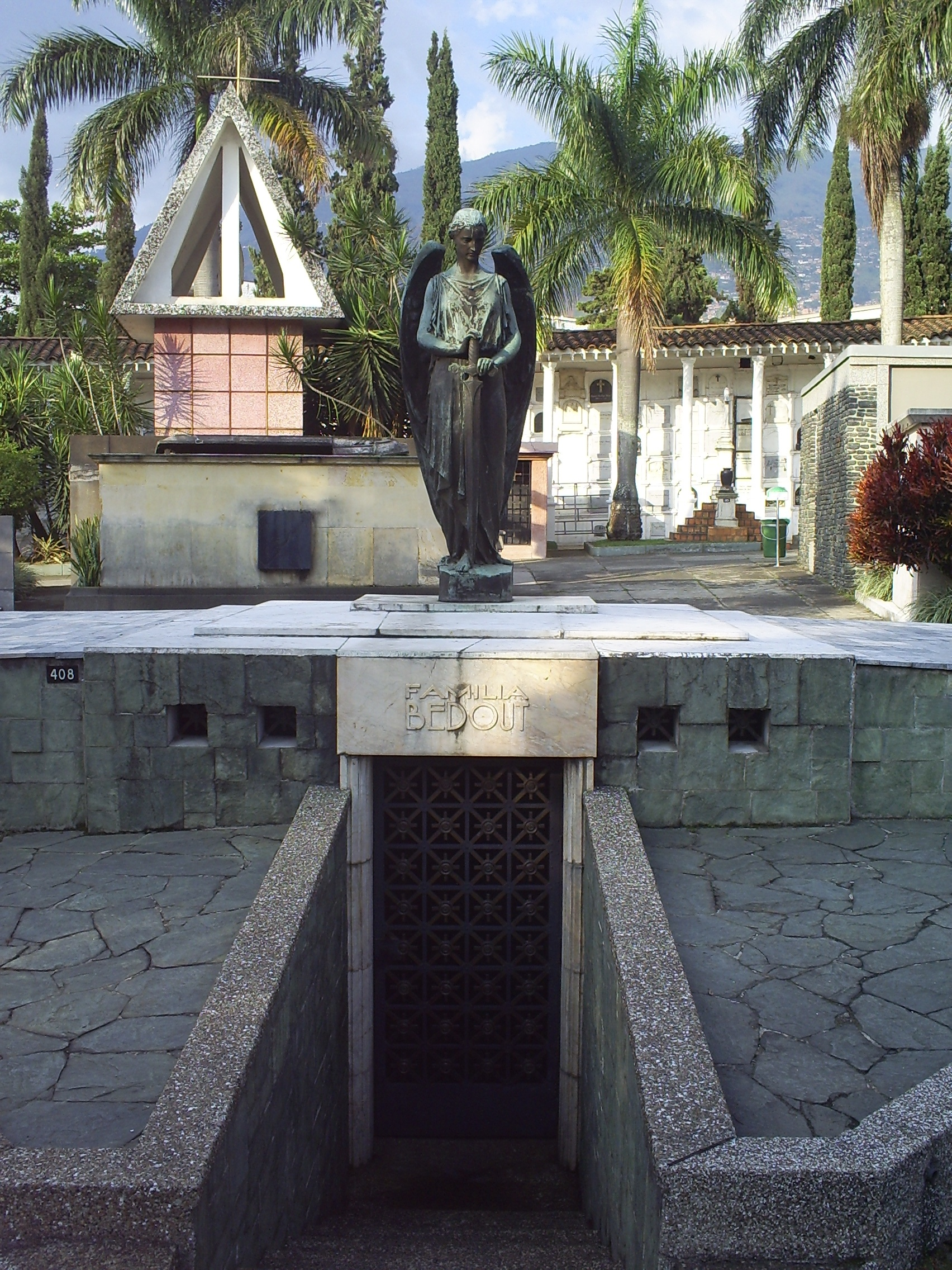
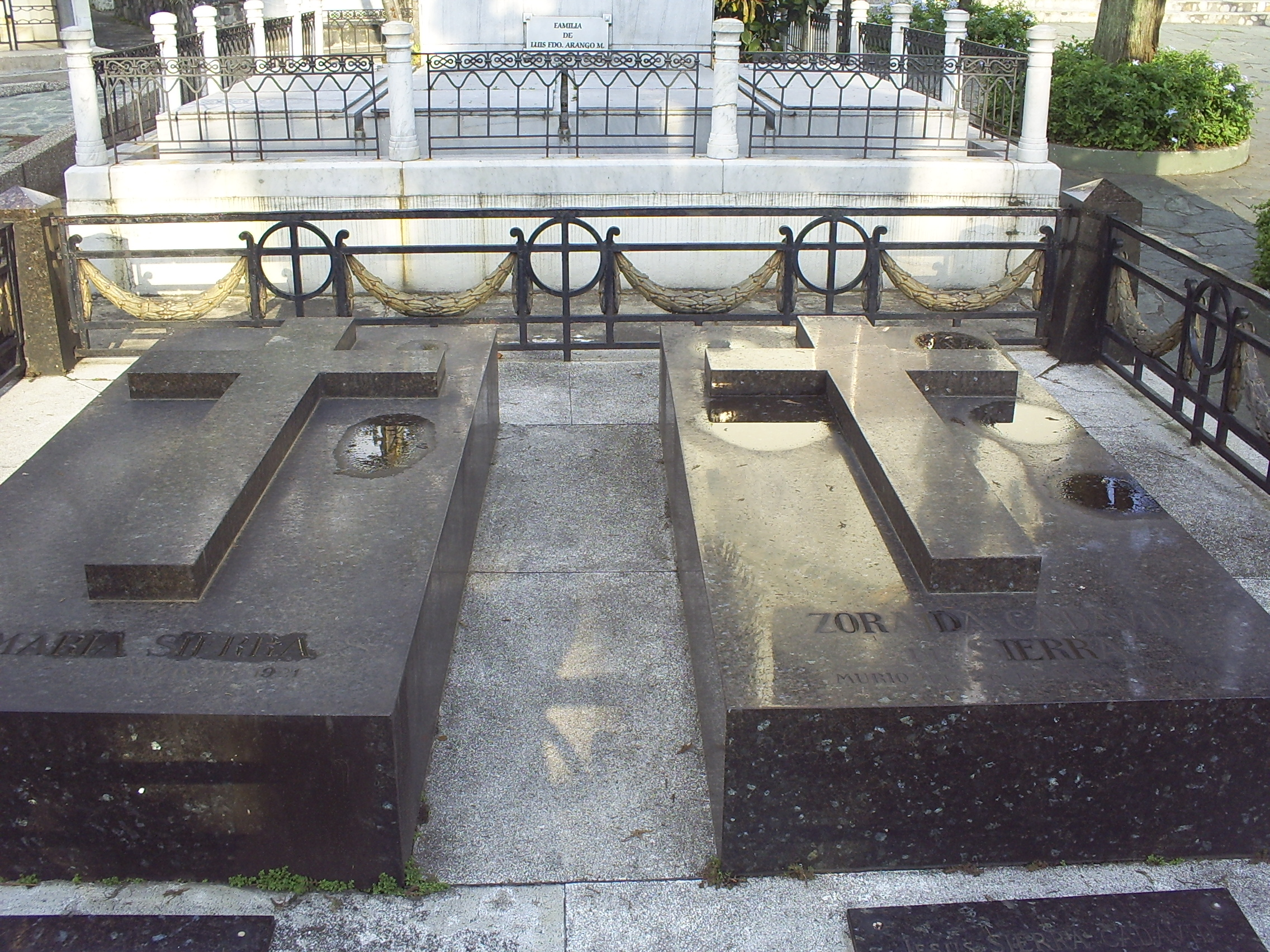
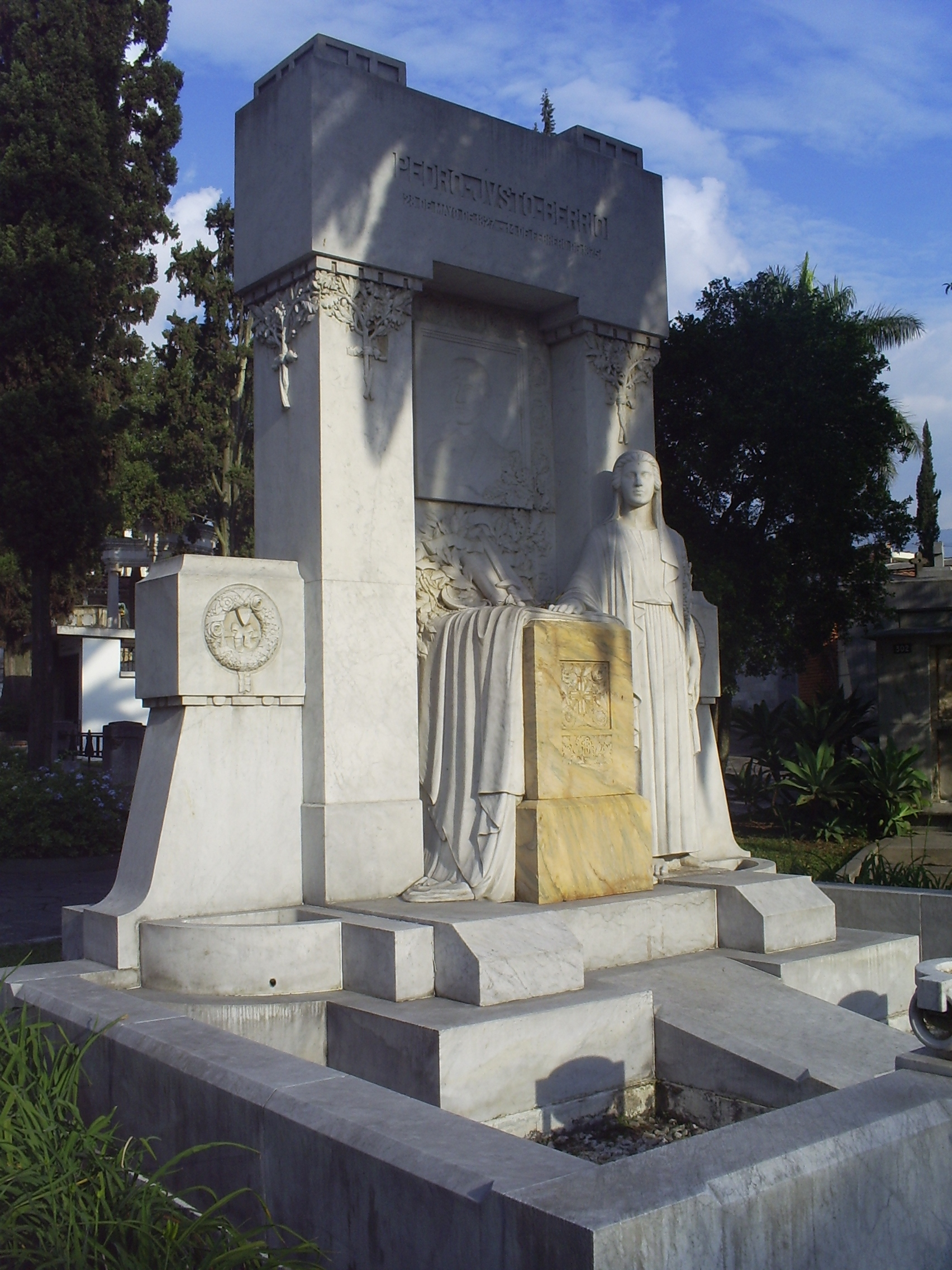
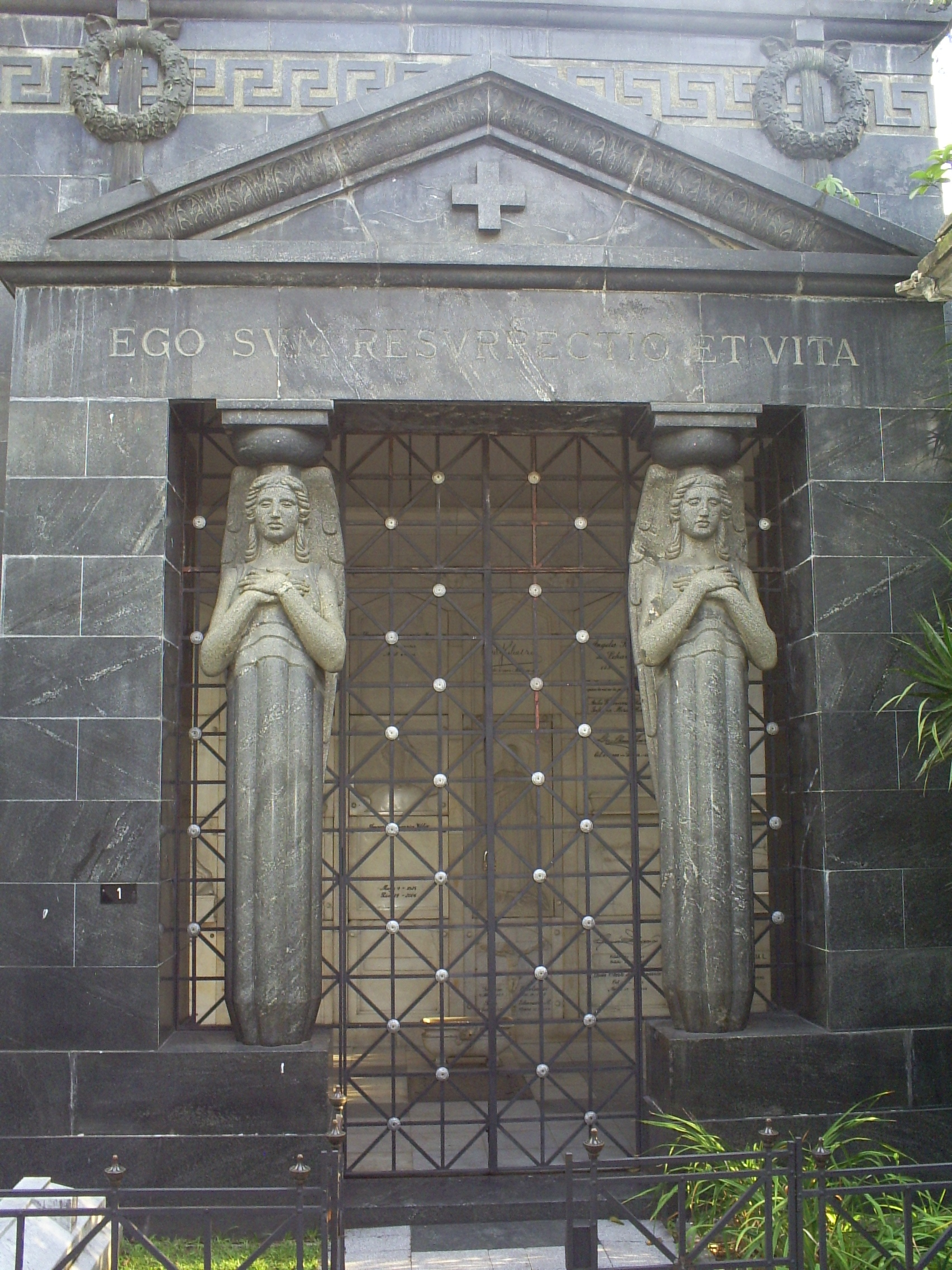
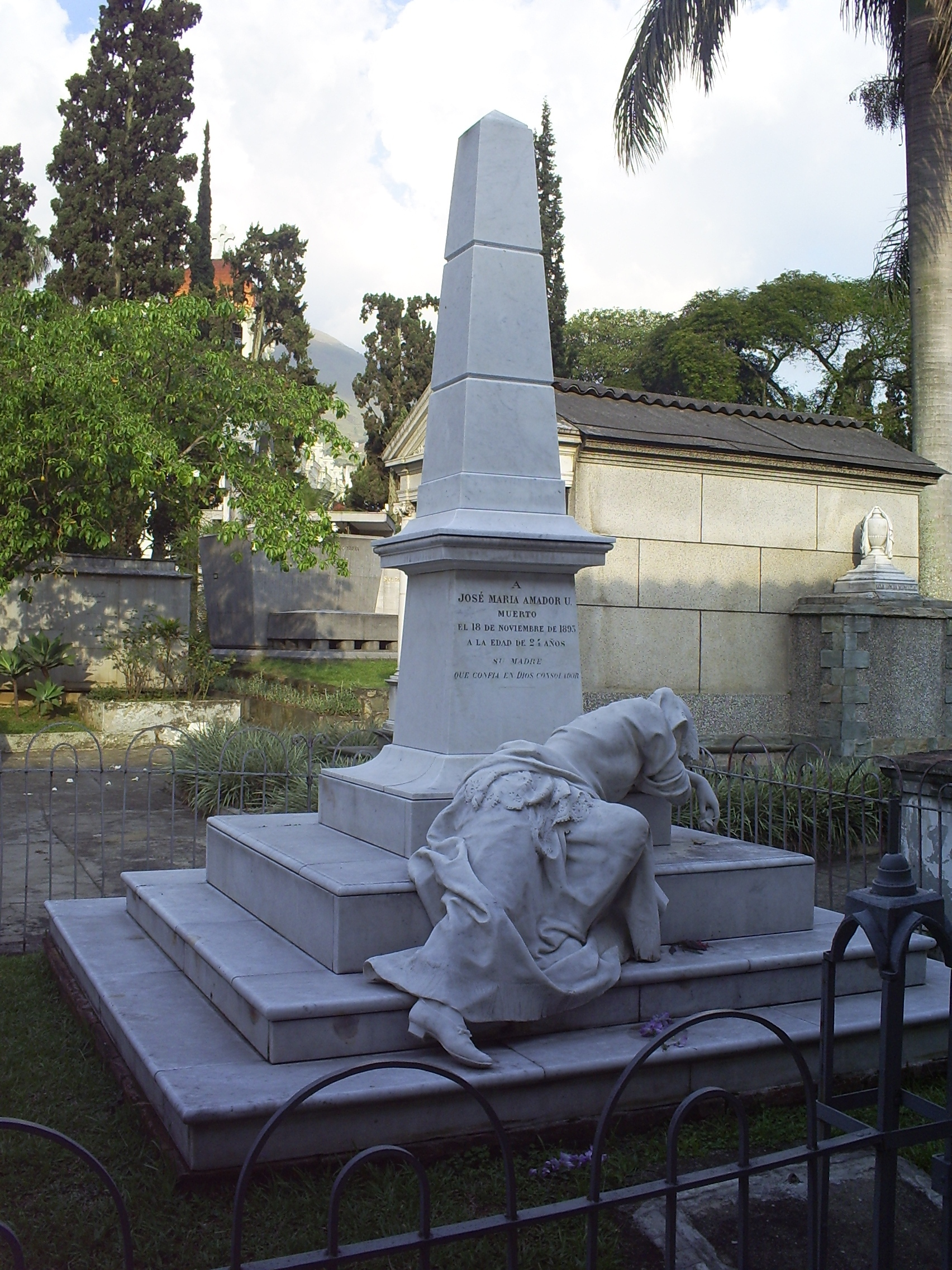
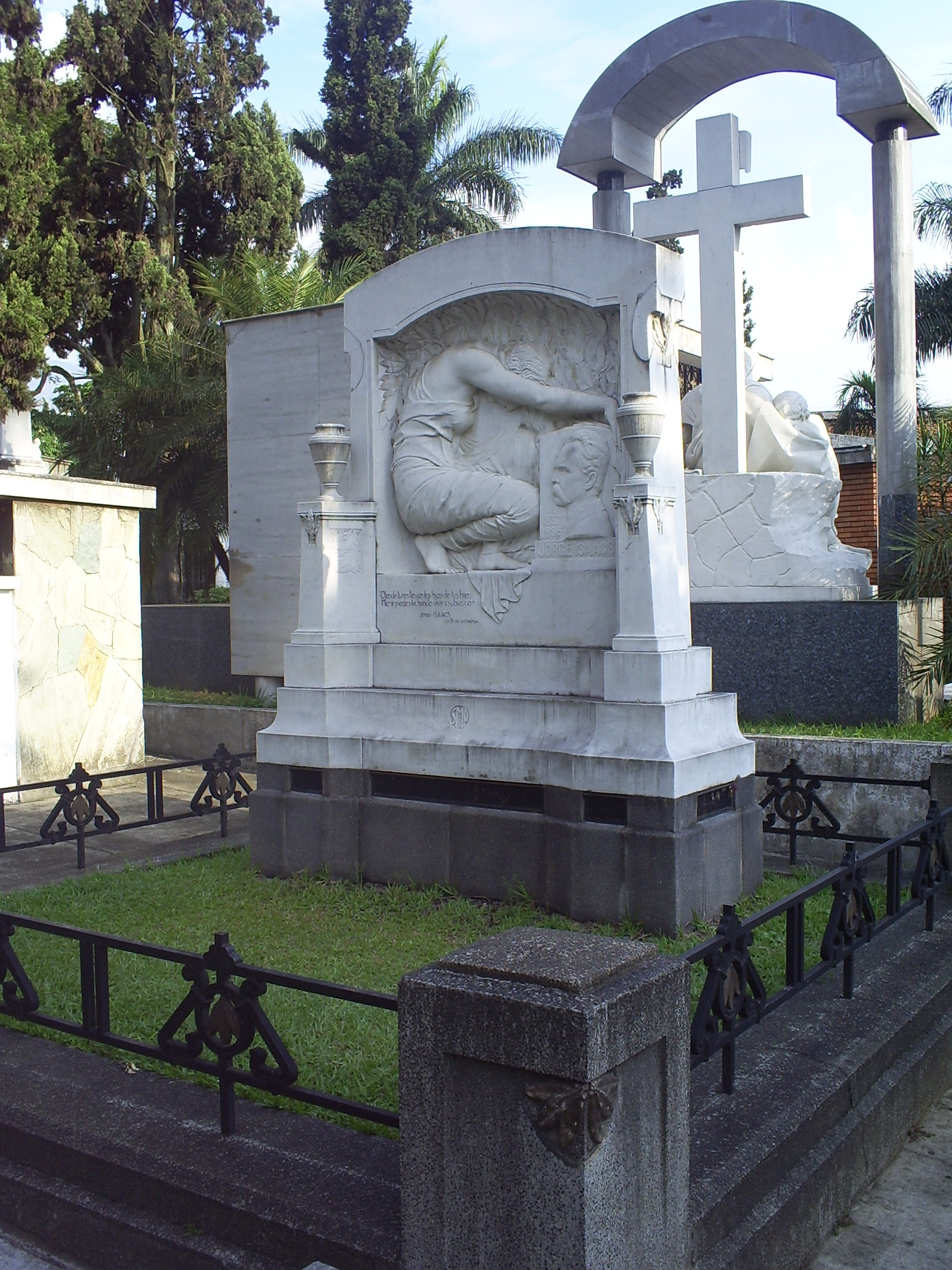
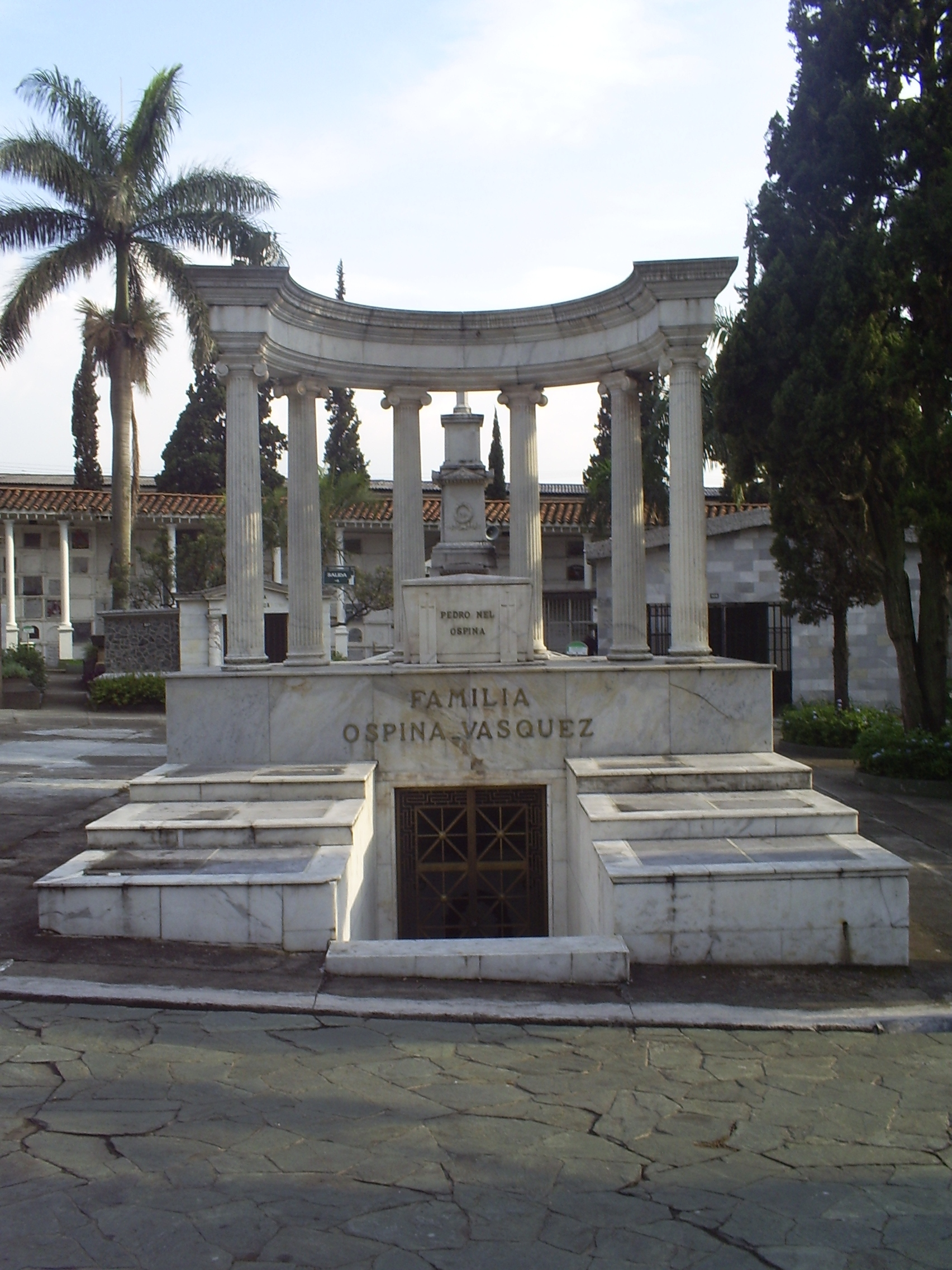
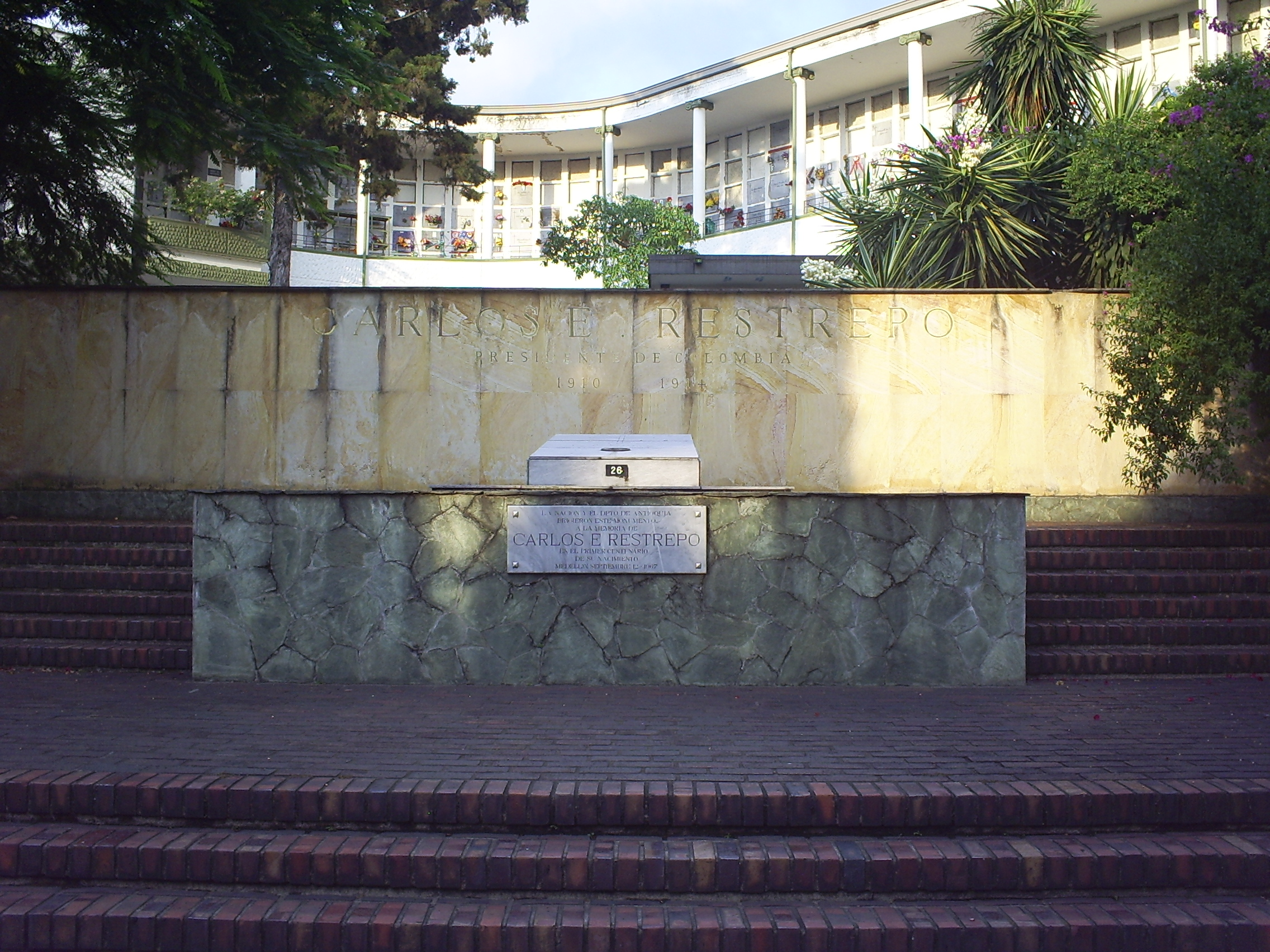
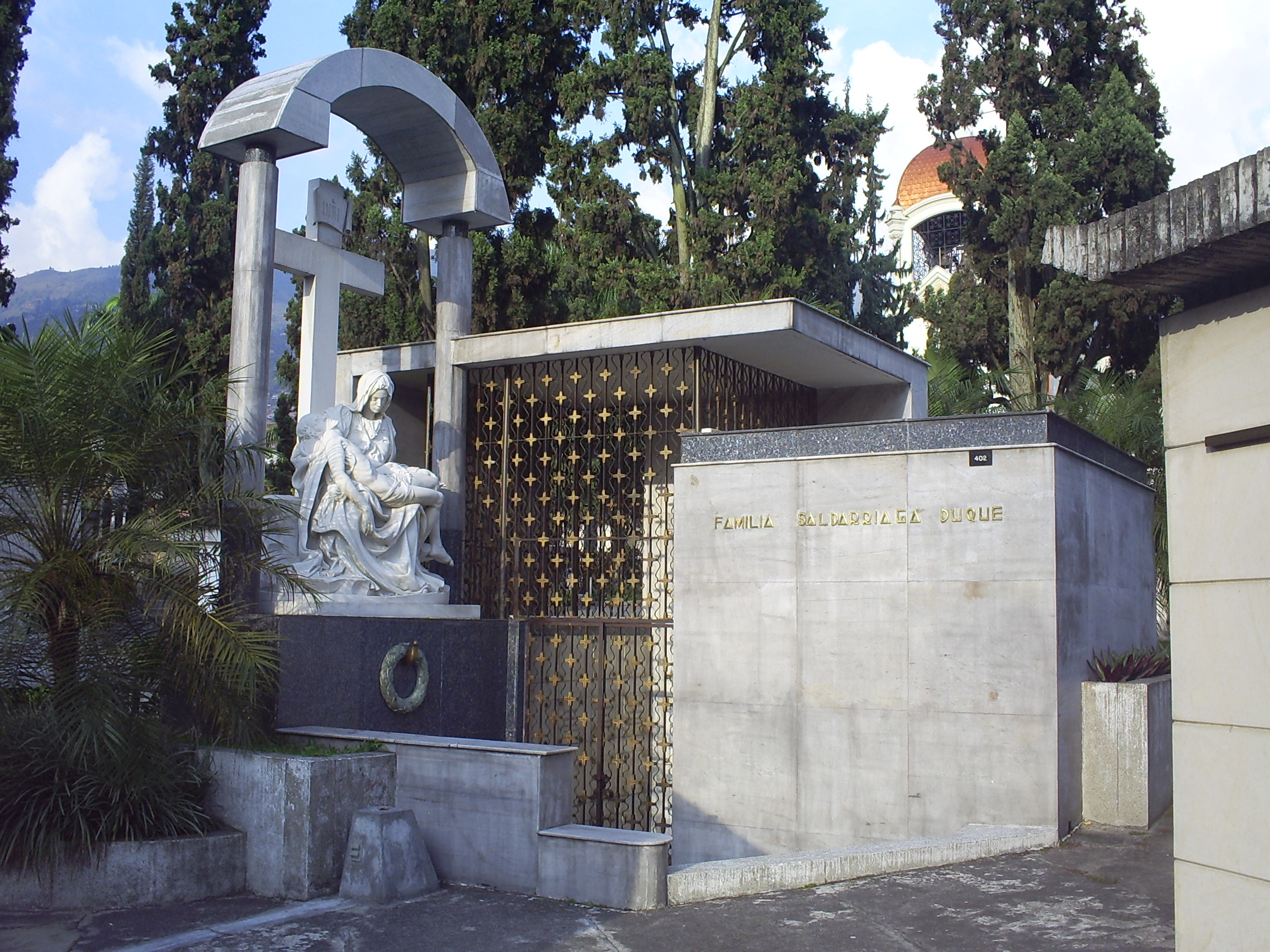
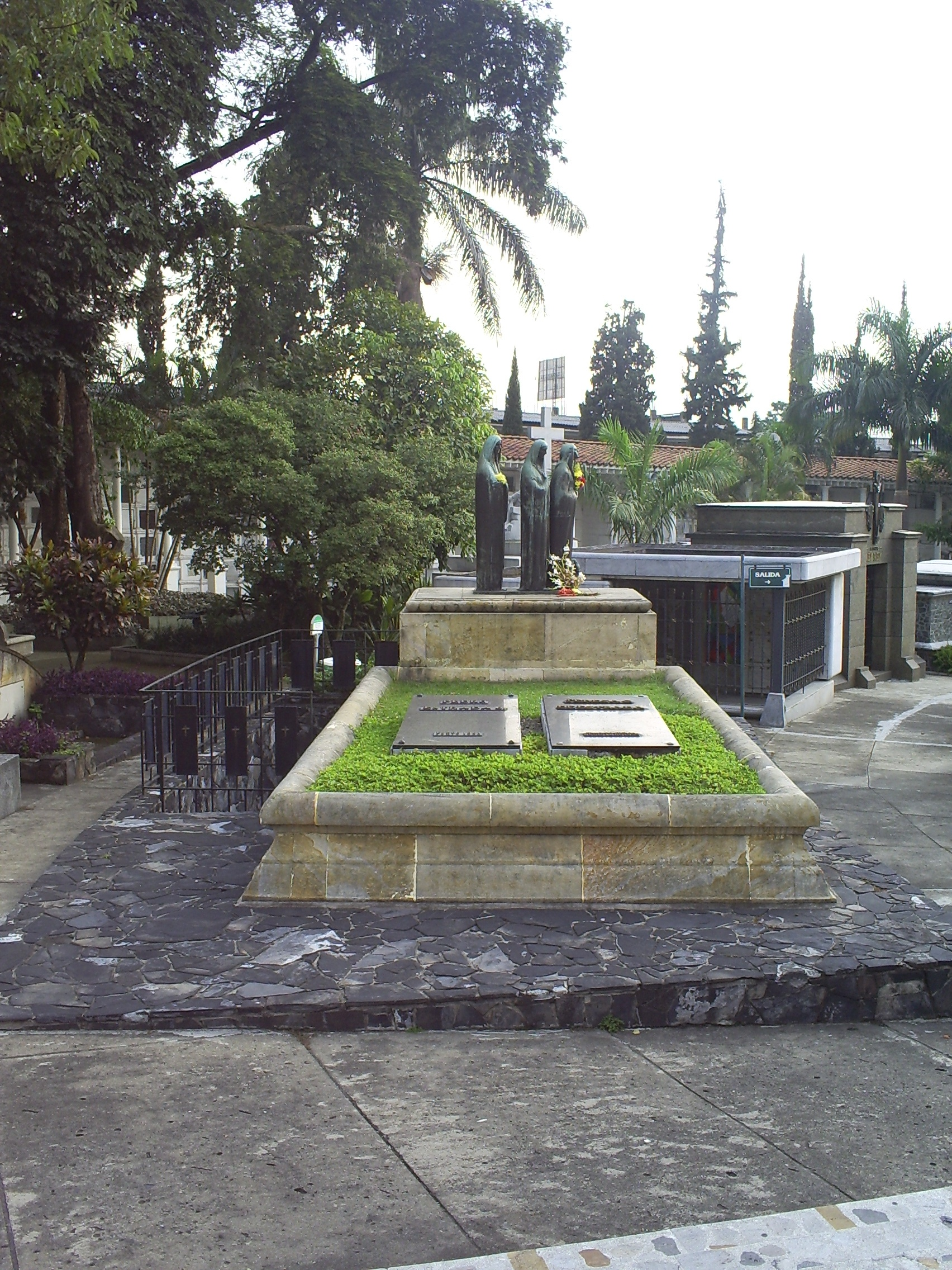
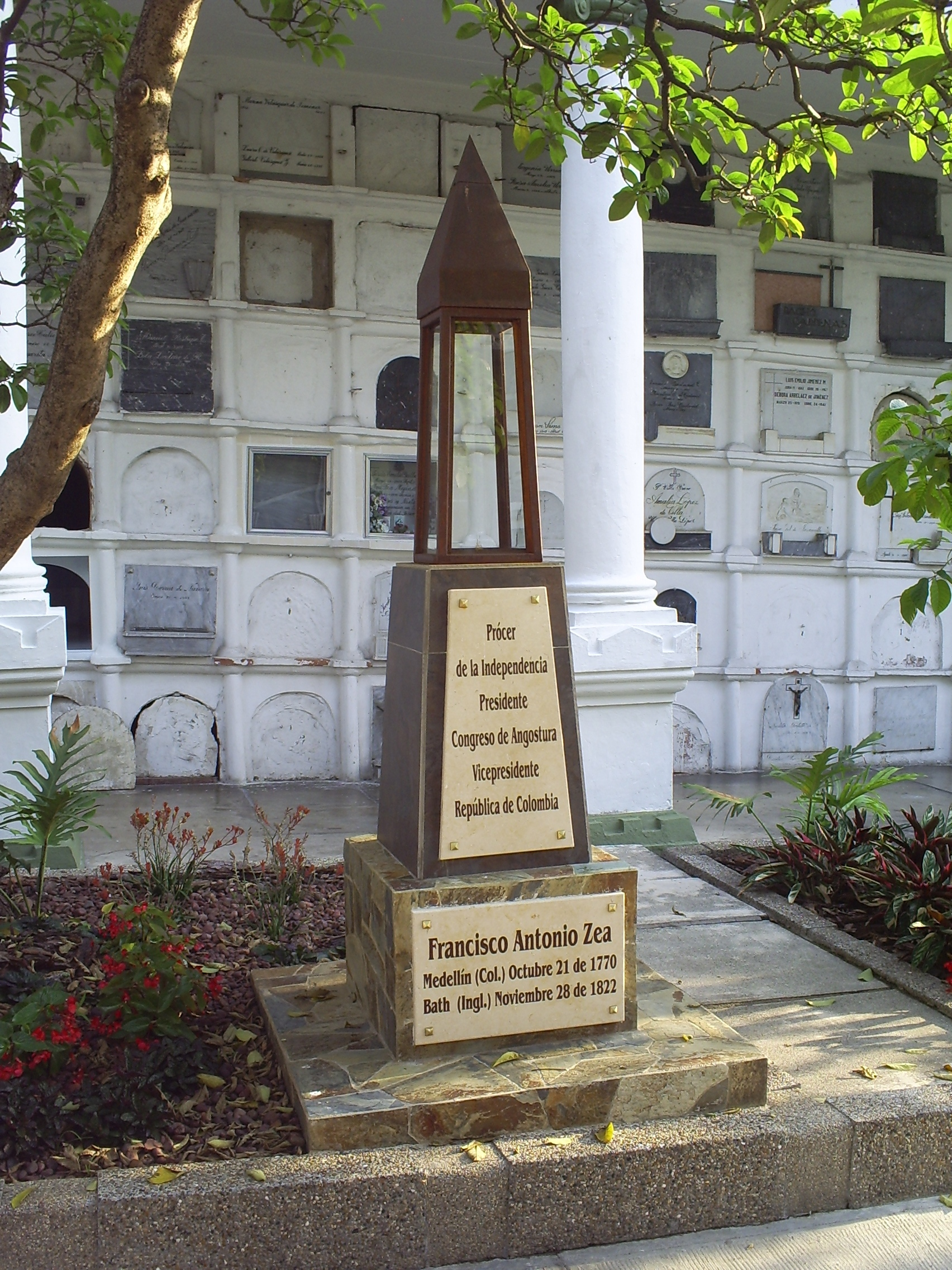
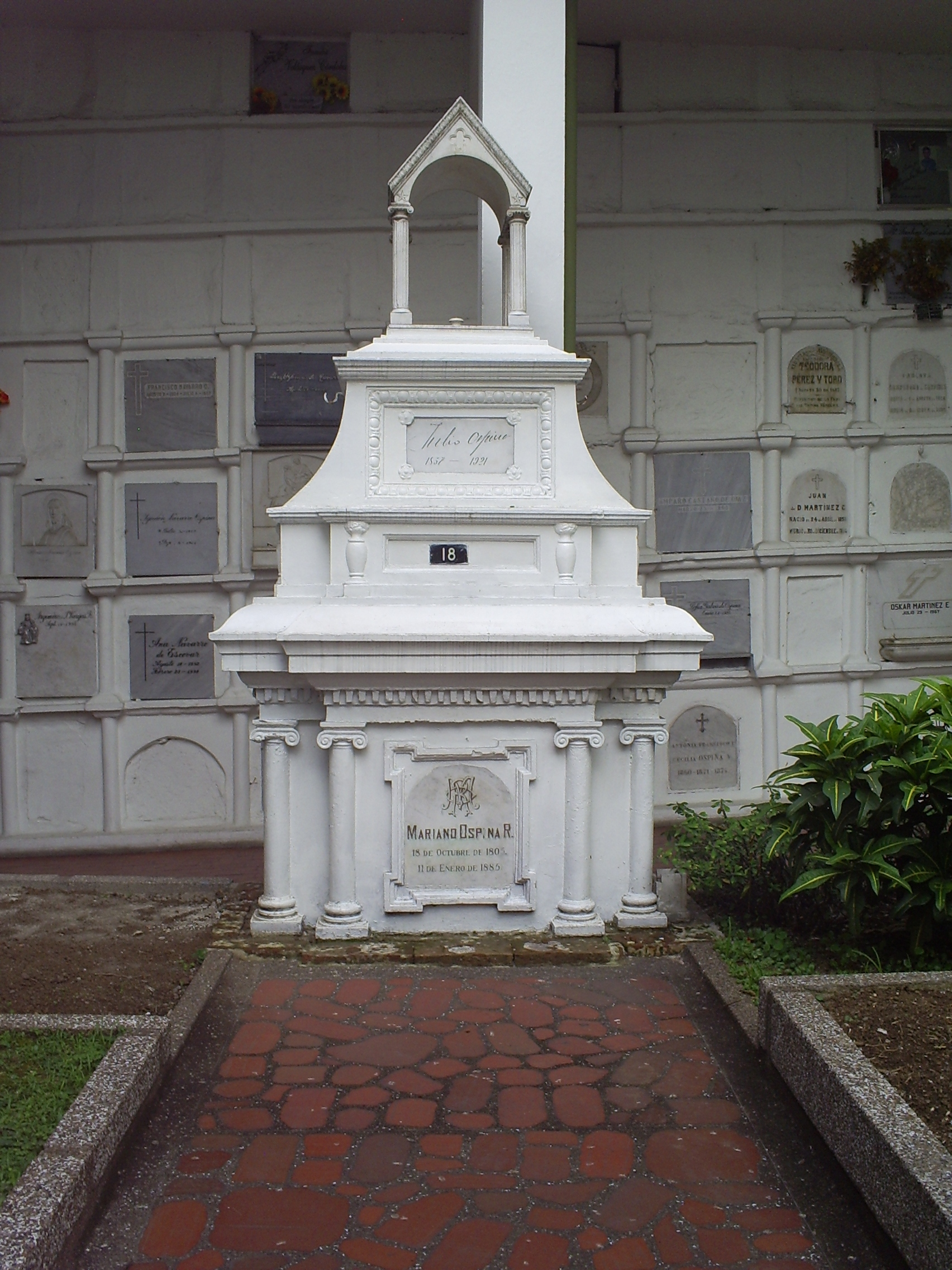
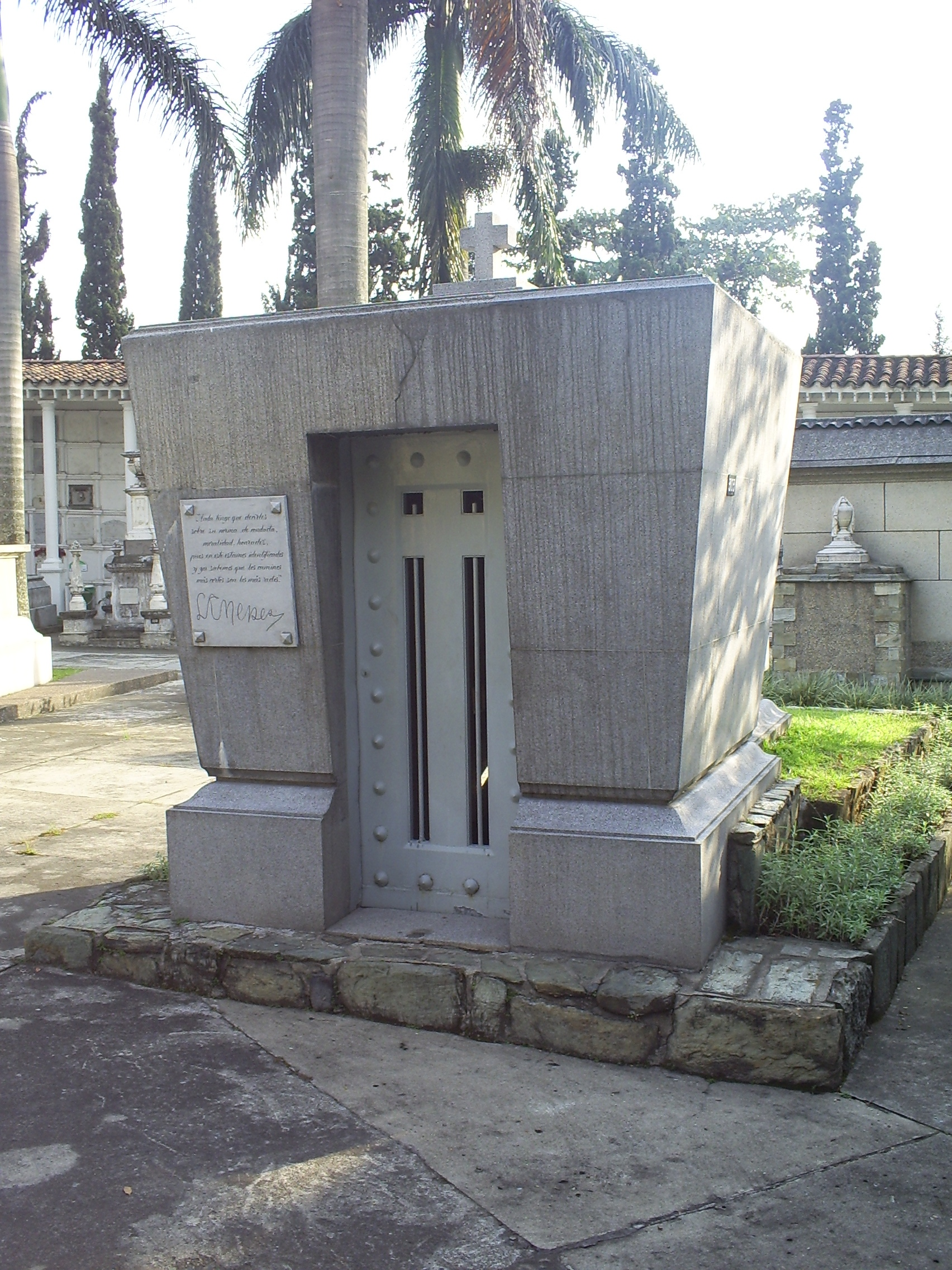
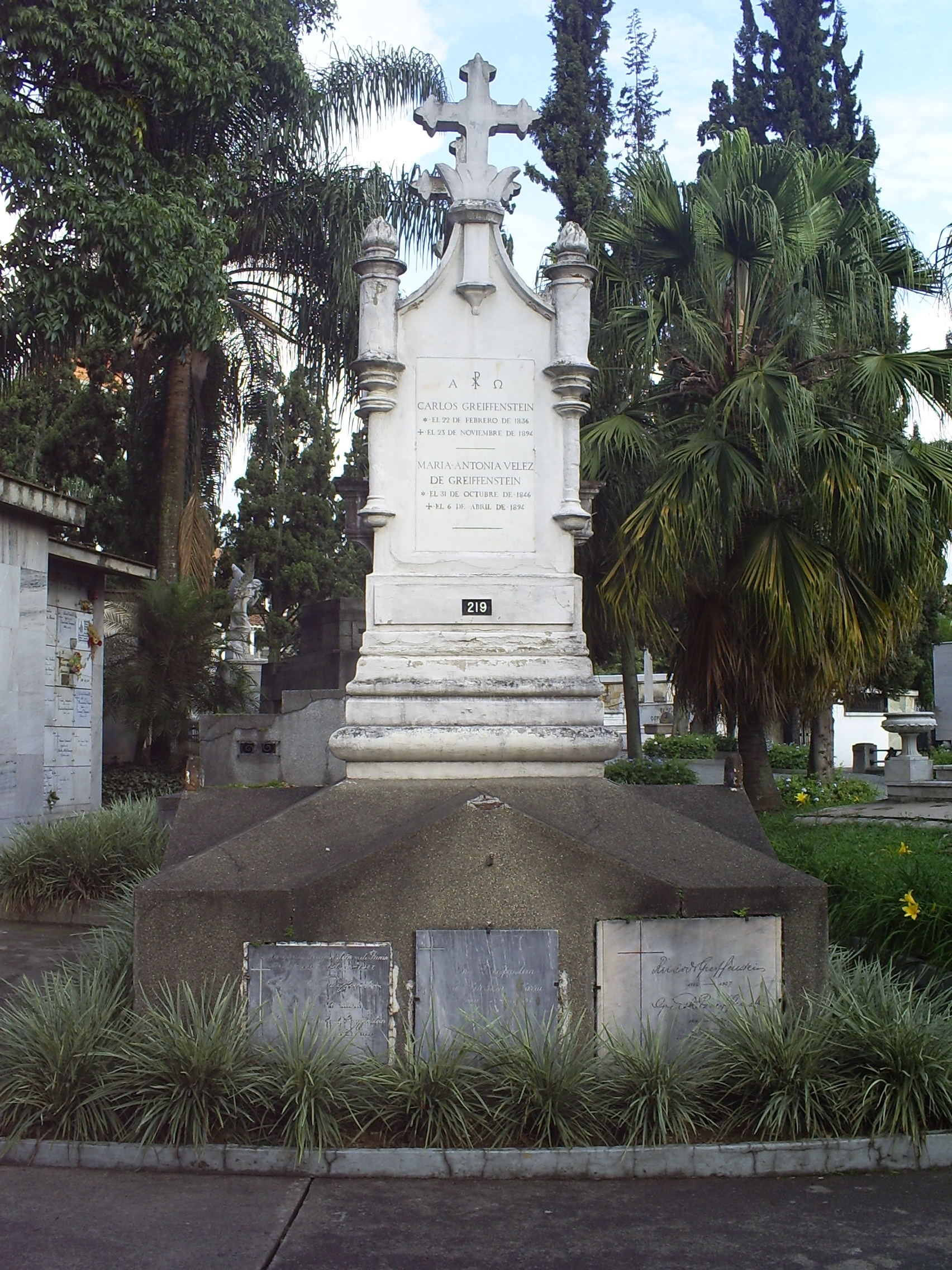
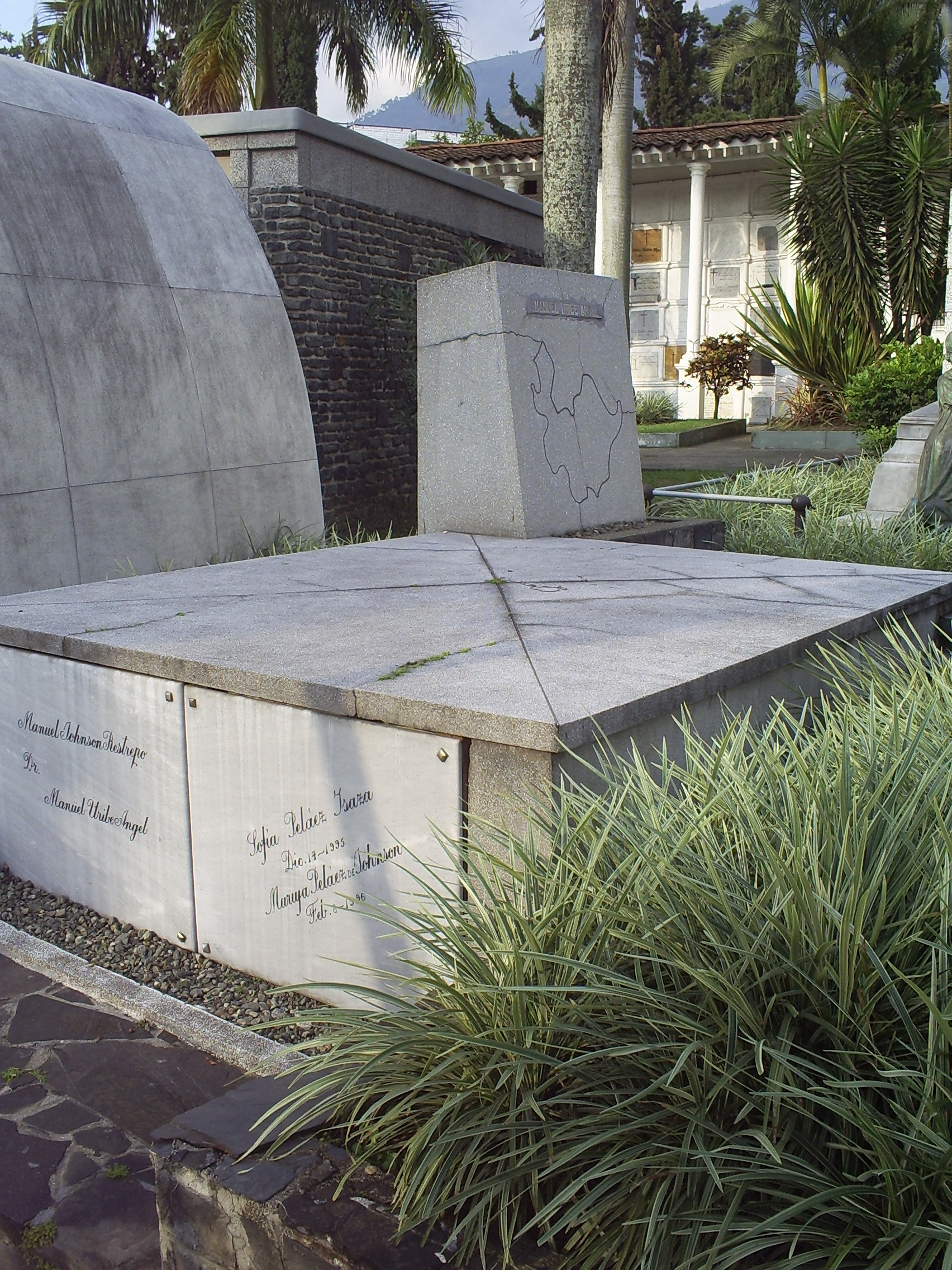
Select mausoleums of famous people
Mausoleum of: Alejandro Ángel; Industrial; Técnica: Dimensiones:	Mausoleum of: Félix de Bedout Moreno; Industrial; Técnica: Dimensiones:
Mausoleum of: José María sierra Empresario; Técnica: Dimensiones:	Mausoleum of: Pedro Justo Berrío; Gobernador de Antioquia político colombiano Técnica: Dimensiones:
Mausoleum of: Alejandro Echavarría Isaza; Industrial; Técnica: Dimensiones:	Monument of: José María Amador; Empresario; Técnica: Dimensiones:
Mausoleum of: Jorge Isaacs; Novelista y poeta colombiano Técnica: Dimensiones:	Mausoleum of: Pedro Nel Ospina; Presidente de la República; Técnica: Dimensiones:
Mausoleum of:: Carlos Eugenio Restrepo; Presidente de la República; Técnica: Dimensiones:	Mausoleum of: German Saldarriaga del Valle; Industrial; Técnica: Dimensiones:
Mausoleum of: Bernardo Vieco Ortiz; Escultor; Técnica: Dimensiones:	Mausoleum of: Francisco Antonio Zea; Prócer de la independencia Técnica: Dimensiones:
Mausoleum of: Mariano Ospina Rodríguez; Presidente de la República; Técnica: Dimensiones:	Mausoleum of: Luis Eduardo Yepes; Empresario; Técnica: Dimensiones:
Mausoleum of: Carlos Greiffenstein; Ingeniero y empresario Técnica: Dimensiones:	Mausoleum of: Manuel Uribe Ángel; Gobernador de Antioquia, Médico y geógrafo Técnica: Dimensiones:
