= Pedro Justo Berrío =

Colombian lawyer, soldier, and politician

Pedro Justo Berrío Rojas
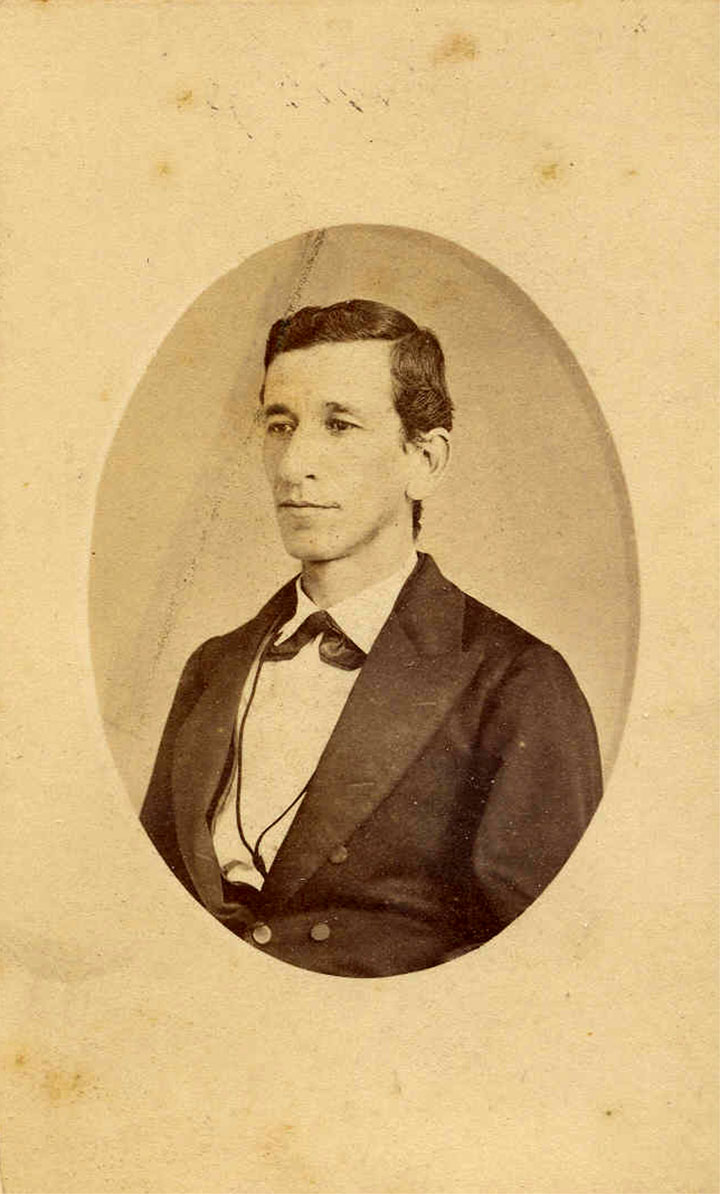

Governor of Antioquia
- In office 1864–1873

Senator

Personal details
- Born: May 28, 1827 Santa Rosa de Osos, Antioquia, Gran Colombia
- Died: February 14, 1875 (aged 47)
- Resting place: San Pedro Cemetery Museum
- Party: Conservative
- Spouse: Estefanía Díaz

Pedro Justo Berrío (May 28, 1827 - February 14, 1875) was a Colombian lawyer, soldier, and politician. He held several legislative positions throughout his life, including governor of Anitioquia from 1864 to 1873. He was born in the municipality of Santa Rosa de Osos of Antioquia Province (of Gran Colombia) in 1827, and died in the city of Medellín, the capital of the Sovereign State of Antioquia in 1875.

Several places in Antioquia are named after him, including Berrío Park, a plaza in the center of Medellín, Puerto Berrío, and the Salesian Pedro Justo Berrio School.

== Early life ==
He was the son of Lorenzo Berrio Hernández, a trader and educator in Santa Rosa de Osos, and Juliana Rojas. He studied theology, philosophy, and law in the San Fernando seminary in the city of Santa Fe of Antioquia. In 1851, he graduated as a lawyer in Bogotá, a city which saw the formation of the Liberal and Conservative parties. He adhered toward the principles of the latter.

In 1858, he married Estefanía Díaz, with whom he had six children.

== Governor of Antioquia ==
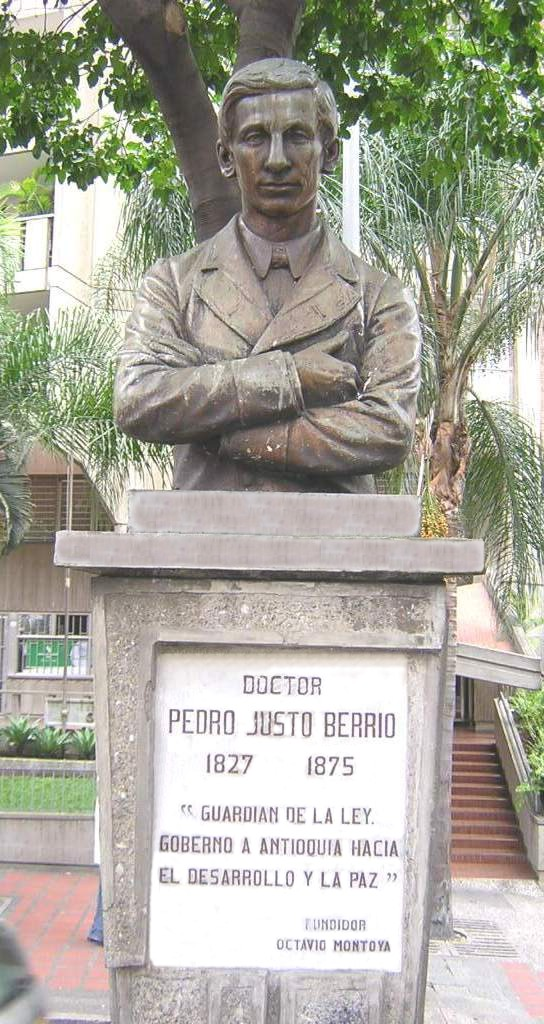
Bust of Pedro Justo Berrío

Pedro Justo Berrío became governor after his liberal predecessor was overthrown. Manuel Murillo Toro, who was a liberal and at the time was also President of the United States of Colombia, accepted this action as fait accompli, setting a precedent for self-determination in the federated states.

In 1864, his first administration had the slogan, "peace, roads, and schools". As such, he passed laws that made primary education compulsory.

He helped connect Antioquia to other parts of the country through the Antioquia Railway starting in 1874. There is a plaque acknowledging his role in the railway construction outside the La Quebrada tunnel, which the trains used to pass through.
