= List of the first openly LGBTQ holders of political offices =

This is a list of political offices, whether elected or appointed, which have been held by a lesbian, gay, bisexual or transgender person, with details of the first such holder of each office. It should only list people who came out as LGBT before or during their terms in office; it should not list people who came out only after retiring from politics, or people who were outed by reference sources only after their death. It should also exclude openly gay holders of inherited offices (including non-ceremonial monarchs who exercise political power).

The year in brackets refers to the year which the officeholder was elected as an openly LGBT person. If they came out during term of office it is referred to after the year in brackets.

It is ordered by country, by dates of election or appointment. Former countries are also to be listed.

== Heads of state ==
| # | Portrait | Name | Country | National population (while in office) | Office | Political party | Mandate start | Mandate end | Term length | Sexual orientation/ gender identity |
|---|---|---|---|---|---|---|---|---|---|---|
| 1 | | Paolo Rondelli | San Marino | 33,627 (2021 estimate) | Captain Regent | RETE Movement | 1 April 2022 | 1 October 2022 | 183 days | Gay |
| 2 | | Edgars Rinkēvičs | Latvia | 1,827,533 (2023 estimate) | President | Unity | 8 July 2023 | Incumbent | 3 years, 132 days | Gay |
| 3 | | Ana Brnabić | Serbia | 6,532,019 (2026 estimate) | President (acting) | Serbian Progressive Party | 28 September 2026 | 17 November 2026 | 50 days | Lesbian |

== Heads of government ==
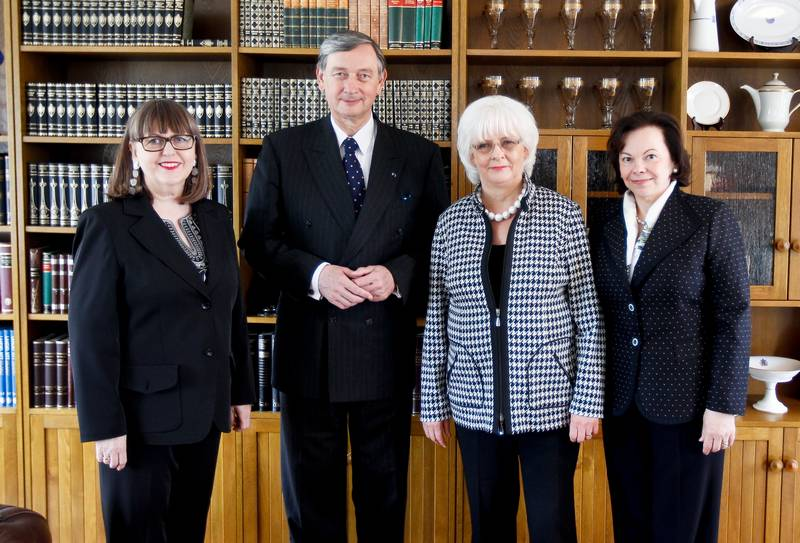
Former prime minister of Iceland, Jóhanna Sigurðardóttir (second from right), and her wife Jónína (far left) with Slovenian President Danilo Türk and his wife Barbara. Official visit to Slovenia.

| # | Portrait | Name | Years | Nation | National population (while in office) | Office | Note |
|---|---|---|---|---|---|---|---|
| 1 | | Jóhanna Sigurðardóttir | 2009–2013 | Iceland | 325,671 (2013 estimate) | Prime Minister | First permanent LGBT head of government. |
| 2 | | Elio Di Rupo | 2011–2014 | Belgium | 11,316,836 (2014 estimate) | Prime Minister | |
| 3 | | Xavier Bettel | 2013–2023 | Luxembourg | 660,809 (2023 estimate) | Prime Minister | |
| 4 | | Leo Varadkar | 2017–2020, 2022–2024 | Ireland | 5,281,600 (2022 estimate) | Taoiseach | |
| 5 | | Ana Brnabić | 2017–2024 | Serbia | 6,647,003 (2022 estimate) | Prime Minister | |
| 6 | | Xavier Espot Zamora | 2019–present | Andorra | 81,588 (2023 estimate) | Prime Minister | |
| 7 | | Gabriel Attal | 2024 | France | 68,042,591 (2023 estimate) | Prime Minister | |
| 8 | | Rob Jetten | 2026–present | Netherlands | 18,044,027 (2025 census) | Prime Minister | |

== International bodies ==
=== European Union ===
==== European Commission ====
- European Commissioner for Trade – Peter Mandelson – 2004 (British)

==== European Parliament ====
Arranged by country

- Austria – Ulrike Lunacek – 2009
- Denmark – Torben Lund – 1999
- Belgium – Petra de Sutter – 2019
- Finland – Silvia Modig – 2019
- France – Roger Karoutchi – 1997 [Came out as gay in 2009]
- Germany – Lissy Gröner – 1989
- Ireland – Maria Walsh – 2019
- Italy – Gianni Vattimo – 1999
- Luxembourg – Tilly Metz – 2018
- Netherlands – Herman Verbeek (PPR) – 1984
- Poland – Robert Biedroń (NL) – 2019
- Portugal – Paulo Rangel (PSD) – 2009 [Came out: 2021]
- Spain – José María Mendiluce Pereiro (PSOE; later joining the Greens) – 1999–2004 [Came out: 2003]
- Spain – Antoni Comín (Junts) – 2019
- Sweden – Fredrick Federley and Malin Björk – 2014
- United Kingdom – Tom Spencer – 1999 [Came out: 1999]
- United Kingdom – Nikki Sinclaire – 2009 [Came out as lesbian in 2004; Came out as transgender in 2013]

== Head of subnational governments ==
The following is a list of LGBT persons who headed the governments of a first-tier administrative division within a sovereign state (such as provinces, lands, states, regions or oblasts).

Currently in office

| Name | Years | Jurisdiction | Population (while in office) | Office | Note |
|---|---|---|---|---|---|
| Gustavo Álvarez Gardeazábal | 1998–1999 | Valle del Cauca (COL) | 4,000,000 (approx.) (Note: Per census published by DANE: 1993 - 3,736,090; 2005 - 4,161,425.) | Governor | Openly gay when elected Governor in 1997. |
| Elio Di Rupo | 1999–2000, 2005–2007, 2019–2024 | Wallonia (BEL) | 3,500,000 (approx.) | Minister-president | Openly gay when appointed minister-president in 1999. |
| Nichi Vendola | 2005–2015 | Apulia (ITA) | 4,000,000 (approx.) (Note: Per census published by ISTAT: 2001 - 4,020,707; 2011 - 4,052,566; 2021 - 3,922,941) | President | Openly gay when elected president in 2005. |
| Rosario Crocetta | 2012–2017 | Sicily (ITA) | 4,900,000 (approx.) (Note: Per census published by ISTAT: 2011 - 5,002,904 ; 2021 - 4,833,329) | President | Openly gay when elected president in 2012. |
| Kathleen Wynne | 2013–2018 | Ontario (CAN) | 14,000,000 (approx.) (Note: Per census published by Statistics Canada: 2011 - 12,851,821; 2016 -13,448,494; 2021 - 14,223,942) | Premier | Openly lesbian when appointed Premier. Assumed Premiership in 2013 upon being selected party leader, won first electoral mandate in 2014 |
| Andrew Barr | 2014–present | Australian Capital Territory (AUS) | 450,000 (approx.) (Note: Per estimates published by Australian Bureau of Statistics: 2014 - 422,747; 2016 - 435,036; 2020 - 457,330) | Chief Minister | Openly gay when appointed chief minister. Assumed premiership in 2014 upon being elected by assembly members mid term, won first electoral mandate in 2016 |
| Wade MacLauchlan | 2015–2019 | Prince Edward Island (CAN) | 150,000 (approx.) (Note: Per census published by Statistics Canada: 2016 - 142,907; 2021 - 154,331) | Premier | Openly gay when appointed premier. Assumed premiership upon being selected party leader, won first electoral mandate in 2015 |
| Kate Brown | 2015–2023 | Oregon (USA) | 4,000,000 (approx.) (Note: Per census published by United States census: 2010 - 3,831,074; 2020 - 4,237,256) | Governor | Openly bisexual when succeeded as governor. As Secretary of State succeeded governorship in 2015, won first electoral mandate in 2018 |
| Eduardo Leite | 2019–2022, 2023–present | Rio Grande do Sul (BRA) | 10,800,000 (approx.) (Note: Per census published by IBGE: 2022 - 10,882,965) | Governor | Openly gay when elected governor in 2018. |
| Fátima Bezerra | 2019–present | Rio Grande do Norte (BRA) | 3,200,000 (approx.) (Note: Per census published by IBGE: 2022 - 3,302,729) | Governor | Openly lesbian when elected governor in 2018 |
| Jared Polis | 2019–present | Colorado (USA) | 5,750,000 (approx.) (Note: Per census published by United States census: 2020 - 5,773,714) | Governor | Openly gay when elected governor in 2018. |
| Gustavo Melella | 2019–present | Tierra del Fuego (ARG) | 190,000 (approx.) (Note: Per census published by INDEC: 2022 - 190,641) | Governor | Openly gay when elected governor in 2019. |
| Antonino Spirlì | 2020–2021 | Calabria (ITA) | 1,855,454 (Note: Per census published by ISTAT: 2021 - 1,855,454) | President (Acting) | |
| Tina Kotek | 2023–present | Oregon (USA) | 4,200,000 (approx.) (Note: Per census published by United States census: 2020 - 4,237,256) | Governor | Openly lesbian when elected governor in 2022. |
| Maura Healey | 2023–present | Massachusetts (USA) | 7,100,000 (approx.) (Note: Per census published by United States census: 2020 - 7,029,917) | Governor | Openly lesbian when elected governor in 2022. |
| Colin Martin-Reynolds | 2025–present | Falkland Islands (BOTs) | 3,700 (approx.) (Note: Per census published by Falkland Islands Government: 2021 - 3,662) | Governor | Foreign service officer, openly gay when appointed governor. |
| Colin Martin-Reynolds | 2025–present | South Georgia and the South Sandwich Islands (BOTs) | 20 (approx.) (Note: Non-permanent population) | Commissioner | Foreign service officer, openly gay when appointed governor. |

== Americas ==
=== Argentina ===
- Senate – Osvaldo López – 2011 [First openly gay man]
- Chamber of Deputies – Marcela Virginia Rodríguez – 2001 [First openly lesbian woman]
- Chamber of Deputies – Leonardo Grosso – 2011 [First openly gay man; Came out: 2018]
- Government Minister (Ministry of Foreign Affairs and Worship) – Jorge Faurie – 2017 [First openly gay man]
- Government Minister (Ministry of Culture) – Teresa Parodi – 2014 [First openly lesbian woman; Came out: 2025]
- Government Minister (Ministry of Women, Genders and Diversity) – Ayelén Mazzina – 2022 [First openly lesbian woman]
- Government Secretary (Undersecretary of Diversity Policies) – Alba Rueda – 2019 [First openly transgender person]
- Government Member (Office for the Coordination of Diversity and Non-Discrimination of the Ministry of Security) – Mara Pérez Reynoso – 2015 [First openly transgender person]
- Provincial governor (Tierra del Fuego) – Gustavo Melella – 2019 [First openly gay man]
- Buenos Aires City Legislature – María Rachid – 2011 [First openly lesbian woman]
- Buenos Aires City Legislature – Maximiliano Ferraro – 2011 [First openly gay man]
- Mayor (General Pinto, Buenos Aires) – Alexis Guerrera – 2003 [First openly gay man]
- Mayor (Loncopué, Neuquén) – María Fernanda Villone – 2011 [First openly lesbian woman]
- Municipal councillor (Escobar, Buenos Aires Province) – Sandra Edith "Tía Gaucha" Tancredi – 2022 [First openly transgender person]
- Municipal councillor (General La Madrid, Buenos Aires Province) – Ariel Lucho López – 2023 [First openly non-binary person]

=== Aruba ===
- Parliament of Aruba (Senator) – Miguel Mansur – 2021 [First openly gay party leader]

=== Bolivia ===
- Congressperson (Deputy) – Manuel Canelas – 2015 [First openly gay male]
- Assemblyperson (La Paz) – París Galán – 2015 [First openly transgender male]

=== Chile ===
- Councilmember – Alejandra González Pino – 2004 [First elected transgender woman]
- Councilmember – Jaime Parada – 2012 [First openly gay male]
- Chamber of Deputies – Claudio Arriagada – 2013 [First openly gay male]
- Chamber of Deputies – Guillermo Ceroni – 2013
- Chamber of Deputies – Emilia Schneider – 2021 [First openly transgender person]
- Chamber of Deputies – Marcela Riquelme – 2021 [First openly lesbian female]
- Chamber of Deputies – Francisca Bello, Camila Musante – 2021 [First openly bisexual female]

=== Colombia ===
- Congressperson – Tamara Argote – 2022 [first openly non-binary member of Congress]
- Mayor of Bogota – Claudia López – 2019 [first openly LGBTQ (lesbian)]
- Mayor of Chapinero – Blanca Inés Durán Hernández – 2008–2012 [openly lesbian]
- Minister of Transport – Cecilia Álvarez-Correa Glen − 2012–2014 [Came out: 2014]
- Minister of Education – Gina Parody – 2014–2018
- Minister of Commerce – Cecilia Álvarez-Correa Glen – 2014–2018 [Came out: 2014]
- Minister of Environment – Ricardo Lozano Picón – 2018
- Minister of Justice – Néstor Osuna – 2022–2024 [openly homosexual]
- Minister of Equality and Equity – Juan Carlos Florián – 2025–2026 [openly LGBTQ]
- National Agency Director (Alexander von Humboldt Institute for Biodiversity) – Brigitte Baptiste [first openly transgender woman]
- Representative – Angélica Lozano – 2014 [first openly bisexual legislator]
- Representative– Mauricio Toro – 2018 [first openly gay man elected to Congress]
- Senator – Angélica Lozano – 2018 [first openly LGBTQ (bisexual) senator]
- Senator – Claudia López – 2015

=== Costa Rica ===
- Legislative Assembly – Carmen Muñoz – elected 2010 and minister appointed in 2014 [first openly lesbian person]
- Cabinet Minister – Wilhelm von Breymann Barquero – appointed in 2014. [first openly gay man]
- Legislative Assembly – Enrique Sánchez – 2018 [first openly gay male]
- Second Vice Mayor – Municipality of the Canton of Moravia – Gerhard Phillip Hernández Padilla – elected in 2024 [first openly trans man].

=== Cuba ===
- Municipal council – Adela Hernández – 2012 [First transgender person elected to office]

=== Curaçao ===
- Governor of Curaçao – Mauritsz de Kort – November 4, 2025 – present).

=== Ecuador ===
- National Assembly – Sandra Alvarez – 2009 [first openly LGBT substitute lawmaker.]
- Minister of Health – Carina Vance Mafla – 2012
- National Assembly – Diane Marie Rodríguez Zambrano – 2017 [First transgender woman substitute lawmaker]
- Mayor of Pujilí – José Arroyo Cabrera – 2023 [first openly LGBTQ mayor in Ecuador]

=== El Salvador ===
- Mayor (Intipucá) – Hugo Salinas – 2009

=== Guatemala ===
- Member of Congress – Sandra Morán – 2016 [First lesbian female congressperson]
- Member of Congress – Aldo Dávila – 2020[First gay male congressperson]
- Member of Central American Parliament – José Carlos Hernández Ruano − 2020[First Guatemalan gay male parliamentarian]

=== Mexico ===
- Federal Deputy – Patria Jiménez – 1997 [First openly lesbian female]
- Federal Deputy – David Sánchez Camacho – 2006 [First openly gay male]
- Federal Deputy – María Clemente García – 2021 [One of the first two transgender women]
- Federal Deputy – Salma Luévano – 2021 [One of the first two transgender women]
- Local Deputy (Federal District) – Enoé Uranga – 2000 [First openly lesbian female]
- Local Deputy (Federal District) – David Sánchez Camacho – 1997 [First openly gay male]
- Municipal president (Fresnillo, Zacatecas) – Benjamín Medrano Quezada – 2013 [First openly gay male]
- City Council (Guanajuato, Guanajuato) – Rubí Suárez Araujo – 2016 [first transgender city councillor and first openly transgender woman in political office]
- City Council (Durango, Durango) – Ezequiel García Torres – 2017 [First openly gay male]

=== Peru ===
- Councilmember – Luisa Revilla – 2014 [First transgender woman]
- Member of Congress – Carlos Bruce – 2006; 2016–2021 [First openly gay male congressman; Came out: 2014]
- Member of Congress – Alberto de Belaunde (Ungrouped) – 2016
- Minister of Transport and Communications – Carlos Bruce – September 2017

=== Puerto Rico ===
- Chief Justice of the Supreme Court of Puerto Rico – Maite Oronoz Rodríguez – 15 July 2014

=== Trinidad and Tobago ===
- Parliament of Trinidad and Tobago (Senator) – Jowelle de Souza – 2022 [First transgender person]

=== Uruguay ===
- Director of Macro Counseling in Social Policies – Andrés Scagliola – 2010 [First openly gay member of the government; Came out: 2011]
- House of Representatives (Substitute Deputy) – Martín Couto – 2014 [First openly gay congressperson; Came out: 2017]
- Member of Parliament – Michelle Suárez Bértora – 2014 [First transgender legislator]

=== Venezuela ===
- National Assembly (Deputy) – Tamara Adrián – elected 2015 [First transgender woman]
- National Assembly (Deputy) – Rosmit Mantilla – elected 2015 [First openly gay male]
- National Assembly (Deputy) – Gaby Arellano – elected 2016 [First openly lesbian woman]
- State Legislative Council (State Deputy) – Ronny Ortega – elected 2018 [First transgender woman]
- Minister of Foreign Affairs – Oliver Blanco – appointed in 2026 [First openly gay male]

== Europe ==
=== Armenia ===
- Member of Parliament – Lilit Martirosyan – transgender

=== Andorra ===
- Prime Minister – Xavier Espot Zamora – 2019 [First openly gay male to head an Andorran national government in modern times]

=== Austria ===
- Member of Parliament – Ulrike Lunacek – 1999 [First openly lesbian Member of Parliament]
- Member of Parliament – Mario Lindner – 2017 [First openly gay Member of Parliament]
- Minister – Iris Eliisa Rauskala – 2019 [First openly LGBT minister, openly lesbian, Minister of Education]
- Mayor – Georg Djundja – 2019 [First openly LGBT mayor, openly gay, mayor of Oberndorf bei Salzburg]

=== Belgium ===
- Prime Minister – Elio Di Rupo (PS) – 2011 [First openly gay male to head a Belgian national government in modern times]
- Member of the Federal Government (Federal Minister of Civil Service) – Petra De Sutter (Groen) – 2020 [First openly trans national minister in Europe]
- Member of the Flemish Government (Flemish Minister of Education) – Pascal Smet (SP.A) – 2009–2014 [Came out; 2009]
- Member of the Brussels Government (Minister of Mobility and Public Works) – Pascal Smet (SP.A) – 2004–2009
- Member of the Brussels Government – Bruno De Lille (Groen) – 2012
- Member of the Flemish Parliament – Conner Rousseau – 2019 [Came out; 2023]

=== Croatia ===
- Member of Parliament – Domagoj Hajduković – 2011 [First openly gay male]

=== Czech Republic ===
- Member of the Senate – Václav Fischer – 1999–2002
- Minister of Transport – Gustáv Slamečka – 2009–2010
- Minister for Regional Development – Karla Šlechtová – 2014 [First openly lesbian female]
- Regional council member (Prague) – Matěj Stropnický – 2014
- Party leader (Green Party) – Matěj Stropnický – 2016–2017

=== Denmark ===
- Member of Parliament – Yvonne Herløv Andersen – 1998 [She was an MP for a few terms during the 1970s and 1980s, but not while openly lesbian.]
- Member of Parliament – Torben Lund – 1998 [First openly gay male; Came out: February 1998]
- Minister of Culture – Uffe Elbæk – 2011–2012
- Member of Parliament (Alternative in Sjællands Storkreds) – Rasmus Nordqvist – 2015
- Minister of Justice – Søren Pape Poulsen – 2016
- Minister for Science, Technology, Information and Higher Education – Tommy Ahlers – 2018 [Came out (bisexual): July 2018]

=== Estonia ===
- Member of Parliament – Eduard Odinets – 2000

=== Faroe Islands ===
- Member of Parliament – Sonja J. Jógvansdóttir – 2015

=== Finland ===
- Member of Parliament (Finnish Parliament) – Oras Tynkkynen – 2004
- Leader of a major political party (Green League) – Pekka Haavisto – 1992
- Minister of the Environment – Pekka Haavisto – 1995
- Member of Parliament (Finnish Parliament) – Merikukka Forsius – 1999 [First bisexual female]
- Member of Parliament (Finnish Parliament) – Reijo Paananen – 2002
- Secretary of a major political party (Social Democratic Party of Finland) – Reijo Paananen – 2012
- Member of Parliament (Finnish Parliament for Pirkanmaa) – Oras Tynkkynen – 2004
- Member of Parliament (Finnish Parliament for Uusimaa) – Jani Toivola – 2011
- Member of Parliament (Finnish Parliament) – Silvia Modig – 2011 [First lesbian female]
- Minister for International Development – Pekka Haavisto – 2013
- Minister for Foreign Affairs – Pekka Haavisto – 2019

=== France ===
- Member of Parliament (Minister in charge of relations) – André Labarrère – 1981 [Came out: 1998]
- Mayor of Paris – Bertrand Delanoë – 2001 [Came out: 1998]
- Government Member (Ministry of Culture) – Jean-Jacques Aillagon – 2002 (came out in 2002).
- Government Member (Secretary of State for relations with parliament) – Roger Karoutchi – 2007 [Came out: 2009]
- Member of Parliament (National Assembly of France) – Franck Riester – 2007 [Came out: 2011]
- Member of Parliament (National Assembly of France, Allier) – Laurence Vanceunebrock-Mialon – 2017
- Government Member (Secretary of State for the Digital Sector) – Mounir Mahjoubi – 2017 (came out in 2018).
- Government Member (Ministry of Labour - Olivier Dussopt (2017–2024)
- Government Member (Secretary of State for Youth and Education) – Gabriel Attal – 2018 (came out in 2018).
- Mayor of Nancy – Mathieu Klein – 2020
- Mayor of Tilloy-lez-Marchiennes – Marie Cau – 2020 (first transgender mayor in France)
- Government Member (Secretary of State for Youth) – Sarah El Haïry – 2022
- Government Member (Ministry of National Education) – Gabriel Attal – 2023
- Prime Minister – Gabriel Attal – 2024
- Government Member (Ministry for Europe and Foreign Affairs) – Stéphane Séjourné – 2024

=== Germany ===
- Reich Minister without portfolio, Reichsleiter: Ernst Röhm (NSDAP) — 1933–1934 (outed in 1931). Historian Laurie Marhoefer writes that Röhm became the world's "first openly gay politician" after letters in which he called himself "same-sex orientated [gleichgeschlechtlich]" were published by Social Democratic newspapers. He was murdered by the NSDAP in the "Night of the Long Knives" (German: Nacht der langen Messer (also called the Röhm purge or Operation Hummingbird (German: Aktion Kolibri)
- Member of Parliament – Helga Schuchardt (FDP) – 1972–1983 [Outed: 1992 (while serving as Minister of Science and Culture in Lower Saxony at that time]
- Member of Parliament – Herbert Rusche (Greens) – 1985–1987
- Member of Parliament (Speaker for Legal Affairs) – Volker Beck (Greens) – 1994
- Member of Parliament (Bundestag) for North Rhine-Westphalia) – Barbara Hendricks (SPD) – 1994
- Member of Parliament (Bundestag) – Tessa Ganserer (Greens) & Nyke Slawik (Greens) – 2021 [First openly transgender persons]
- Mayor (Hamburg) – Ole von Beust – 2001–2010 [He also served as president of Bundesrat in 2007–2008]
- Mayor (Berlin) – Klaus Wowereit – 2001–2014 [He also served as president of Bundesrat in 2001–2002]
- Vice Chancellor – Guido Westerwelle, leader of (FDP) – 2009–2011
- Foreign Minister – Guido Westerwelle, leader of (FDP) – 2009–2013
- Mayor (Bielefeld) – Pit Clausen (SPD) – 2009-2025
- Mayor (Mainz) – Michael Ebling – 2012-2023
- Mayor (Wiesbaden) – Sven Gerich – 2013-2019
- Minister for the Environment, Nature Conservation, Building and Nuclear Safety – Barbara Hendricks (SPD) – 2013–2018
- Mayor (Essen) – Thomas Kufen – 2015
- Health Minister – Jens Spahn (CDU) – 2018–2021
- Mayor (Hamm) – Marc Herter (SPD) – 2020–
- Mayor (Munich) – Dominik Krause (The Greens) – 2026–

=== Greece ===
- Cabinet minister – Nicholas Yatromanolakis (2021)

=== Hungary ===
- Member of Parliament – Klára Ungár^{(hu)} – 1990–1994, 1994–1998 [First openly lesbian female]
- Member of Parliament – László Sebián-Petrovszki^{(hu)} – 2019–2022, 2022–
- Member of Parliament – Péter Ungár^{(hu)} – 2018–2022, 2022– [First openly gay male, came out: 2019]
- Member of Government (Secretary of State for Human Resources) – Gábor Szetey – 2006–2009 [came out: 2007]

=== Iceland ===
- Prime Minister – Jóhanna Sigurðardóttir – 2009–2013 [First openly gay person in the world to be elected head of government]
- Minister of Social Affairs and Social Security – Jóhanna Sigurðardóttir – 1987–1994, 2007–2009
- Minister for the Environment and Natural Resources – Guðmundur Ingi Guðbrandsson – 2017 [First openly gay male to serve as a minister]

=== Ireland ===
- Senator – David Norris (Dublin University) – 1987
- Senator – Katherine Zappone (Taoiseach's nominee) – 2011
- Teachta Dála (member of parliament) – Dominic Hannigan (Meath East) – openly gay when elected in 2011
- Teachta Dála (member of parliament) – John Lyons (Dublin North-West) – openly gay when elected in 2011
- Teachta Dála (member of parliament) – Jerry Buttimer (Cork South-Central) – Elected as TD in 2011; came out in 2012
- Minister for Transport, Tourism and Sport – Leo Varadkar – 2011, came out 2015
- Mayor (Fingal County Council) – Cian O'Callaghan – 2012
- Leader of the Seanad Éireann – Jerry Buttimer – 2016
- Minister for Children and Youth Affairs – Katherine Zappone – 2016 [The first minister to have been openly gay at the time of first appointment to cabinet]
- Taoiseach (Prime Minister) – Leo Varadkar – 2017
- Leader of largest party in Dáil Éireann – Leo Varadkar, Fine Gael – 2017
- Member of the European Parliament – Maria Walsh, 2019
- Minister for Children, Equality, Disability, Integration and Youth – Roderic O'Gorman – 2020
- Government Chief Whip – Jack Chambers, 2020, came out 2024
- Minister of State at the Department of Transport, and at the Department of the Environment, Climate and Communications – Jack Chambers – 2022
- Minister for Finance - Jack Chambers, 2024

=== Isle of Man ===
- Chief Minister – Allan Bell – 2011 [Came out: 2015]

=== Italy ===
- Member of Parliament – Angelo Pezzana^{(it)} – 1979 [First openly gay male]
- Minister for Agriculture – Alfonso Pecoraro Scanio – 2000 [Came out (bisexual): 2000]
- Member of Parliament – Titti De Simone^{(it)} – 2001 [First lesbian]
- Mayor (Gela) – Rosario Crocetta – 2003–2009 [First openly gay male mayor]
- President of Apulia – Nichi Vendola – 2005–2015
- Member of Parliament – Vladimir Luxuria – 2006 [First transgender woman]
- Member of Parliament – Sergio Lo Giudice – 2013 [Former Arcigay president]
- Member of Parliament (Vice president of the Democratic Party) – Ivan Scalfarotto – 2009
- President of Sicily – Rosario Crocetta – 2012–2017
- First transgender mayor (Tromello) – Gianmarco Negri – 2019
- Acting President of Calabria – Antonino Spirlì – 2020–2021
- Minister for Youth Policies and Sport – Vincenzo Spadafora – 2019 [Came out (gay): 2021]

=== Latvia ===
- Member of Parliament (Minister of Foreign Affairs) – Edgars Rinkēvičs – 2014 [First openly gay male; Came out: 2014]
- Member of Parliament – Marija Golubeva – 2018 [First openly lesbian female]
- Chairman of a political party (The Progressives) – Roberts Putnis – 2018 [First openly gay male]
- President – Edgars Rinkēvičs – 2023

=== Lithuania ===
- Member of Parliament: Rokas Žilinskas – 2008
- Member of Parliament: Tomas Vytautas Raskevičius – 2020

=== Luxembourg ===
- Mayor of Luxembourg City – Xavier Bettel – 2011
- Minister of the Economy – Etienne Schneider – 2012
- Prime Minister – Xavier Bettel – 2013
- Deputy Prime Minister – Etienne Schneider – 2013

=== Netherlands ===
- Member of Parliament – Coos Huijsen (CHU) – 1972 (Came out: 1977; World's first openly gay MP)
- Member of Parliament – Evelien Eshuis (CPN) – 1982
- King's Commissioner – Jan Franssen (VVD) – 2000–2013
- Mayor – Arno Brok (VVD) – 2003–2010
- Minister of Economic Affairs – Joop Wijn (CDA) – 2006
- Minister of Agriculture, Nature and Food – Gerda Verburg (CDA) – 2007
- Minister of Finance – Jan Kees de Jager (CDA) – 2010
- Minister of Climate and Energy – Rob Jetten (D66) – 2022
- Minister of the Interior and Kingdom Relations – Kajsa Ollongren (D66) – 2017
- Member of Parliament – Vera Bergkamp (D66) – 2017
- Member of Parliament – Henk Krol (50PLUS) – 2017
- Member of Parliament – Henk Nijboer (PvdA) – 2017
- Member of Parliament – Sjoerd Potters (VVD) – 2017
- Member of Parliament – Lisa van Ginneken (D66) – 2021 (first transgender MP)
- City councillor municipality Apeldoorn – Lilian Haak (VVD) – 2018 (one of the first four transgender councilors)
- City councillor municipality Nijmegen – Michelle van Doorn (PvdD) – 2018 (one of the first four transgender councilors)
- City councillor municipality Utrecht – Sophie Schers (GroenLinks) – 2018 (one of the first four transgender councilors)
- City councillor municipality Utrecht – Corine van Dun (D66) – 2018 (one of the first four transgender councilors)
- Speaker of the House of Representatives – Vera Bergkamp (D66) – 2021
- Prime Minister – Rob Jetten (D66) – 2026

=== Norway ===
- Prime Minister (acting) – Per-Kristian Foss – 2002
- Member of Parliament – Wenche Lowzow – 1977–1985, reelected 1981 [Came out 1979; First openly lesbian female]
- Member of Parliament – Anders Hornslien – 1993–2001 [Came out: 2001]
- City council chairman of Oslo – Erling Lae – 2000–2009
- Member of Bergen city council and chairman of the Red Electoral Alliance and Red Party – Torstein Dahle – 1987–2018, 2003–2007, and 2007–2010 respectively [Came out late 1960s]
- Minister of Finance – Per-Kristian Foss – 2001–2005
- Minister of Health and Care Services – Bent Høie – 2013–2021

=== Poland ===
- Members of the Sejm – Jerzy Andrzejewski and Jarosław Iwaszkiewicz – 1952 [first either gay or bisexual members of Sejm; outed posthumously]
- Member of the State Council – Jerzy Zawieyski – 1956 [first either gay or bisexual member of the State Council; outed posthumously]
- City councilor (Warsaw) – Krystian Legierski – 2010 [first gay city councilor; first openly gay elected politician]
- Member of the Sejm – Anna Grodzka – 2011 [first transgender member of the Sejm; first transgender elected politician] (Note: While Anna Grodzka never conclusively stated her sexual orientation, in some interviews she said she could be seen as either lesbian or bisexual, which would make her either the first lesbian or first female bisexual elected official in Poland. Otherwise, first women to openly and fully identify as bisexual in elected position were Anna Maria Żukowska and Hanna Gill-Piątek, elected to the Sejm in 2019, and first lesbian, Zuzanna Bartel, a member of the Poznań City Council elected in 2024.)
- Member of Sejm – Robert Biedroń – 2011 [first openly gay member of the Sejm]
- Mayor (Słupsk) – Robert Biedroń – 2014 [first gay city mayor]
- Sołtys (Bobrowniki) – Łukasz Włodarczyk – 2017 [first gay sołtys (village mayor)]
- Deputy mayor (Warsaw) – Paweł Rabiej – 2018 [first gay deputy mayor of a city]
- Member of the European Parliament – Robert Biedroń – 2019 [first gay member of European Parliament representing Poland]
- Leader of a political party (New Left) – Robert Biedroń – 2019 [first gay leader of a major political party]
- Member of the Sejm – Anna Maria Żukowska and Hanna Gill-Piątek – 2019 [first bisexual women members of the Sejm, and first openly bisexual elected officials]
- Presidential candidate – Robert Biedroń – 2020 [first gay presidential candidate]
- Member of a regional assembly (Łódź Voivodeship Sejmik) – Hanna Gill-Piątek – 2024 [first bisexual member of a regional assembly (sejmik)]
- City councillors – Zuzanna Bartel (Poznań) and Marta Magott (Gdańsk) – 2024 [first lesbian elected officials; first lesbian city councillors]
- City councillor (Kraków) – Aleksandra Owca – 2024 [first bisexual city councillor]

=== Portugal ===
- Member of Parliament – Miguel Vale de Almeida – 2009–2010
- Member of the government (Secretary of State Assistant and of Administrative Modernisation) – Graça Fonseca – 2015–2018 [Came out: 2017]
- Member of the government (Minister of Culture) – Graça Fonseca – 2018
- Party deputy leader – Adolfo Mesquita Nunes (CDS – People's Party) – 2018
- Member of the government (Secretary of State of the Presidency of the Council of Ministers) – André Caldas – 2020
- Member of the government (Minister of State and of Foreign Affairs) - Paulo Rangel - 2024

=== Serbia ===
- Prime Minister – Ana Brnabić – 2017
- Government minister (Minister of Public Administration and Local Self-Government) – Ana Brnabić – 2016–2017
- Assistant Minister for International Cooperation in the Ministry of Human and Minority Rights and Social Dialogue – Boris Milićević – 2020

=== Slovakia ===
- Member of Parliament – Edita Angyalová – 2002 [First openly lesbian female]
- Member of Parliament – Stanislav Fořt – 2011 [First openly gay male; Came out: 2011]
- Member of Bratislava city council – Lucia Plaváková – 2022 [First openly member of Bratislava city council]
- Mayor of the town Mýto pod Ďumbierom - Roman Švantner- 2006 [First openly mayor of town]

=== Slovenia ===
- Minister of Solidarity-Based Future of Slovenia – Simon Maljevac – 2023 to 2026

=== Spain ===
- Member of the Cortes (Senate) – Jerónimo Saavedra (PSOE) – 1977–2004 [Came out: 2000]
- Regional President (President of the Canary Islands) Jerónimo Saavedra – 1983–1987, 1991–1993 [Came out: 2000]
- Minister of Public Administrations and Minister of Education and Science- Jerónimo Saavedra (Public Administrations, 1993–1995 and of Education and Science 1995–1996)
- Town councillor (Geldo, Castellon) Manuela Trasobares (ARDE) – 2007 [First transgender woman]
- Mayor of a Provincial Capital (Las Palmas de Gran Canaria) – Jerónimo Saavedra – 2007–2011
- Member of the Cortes (Madrid) – Ángeles Álvarez (PSOE) – 2011
- Mayor of an Autonomic Capital (Vitoria-Gasteiz) – Javier Maroto (PP) – 2011–2015 [Member of Basque Parliament since 2012, Sectorial Under-secretary of the Spanish People's Party since 2015. Member of the Member of the Cortes since 2016]
- Minister of the Interior – Fernando Grande-Marlaska – 2018–present
- Minister of Culture and Sport – Màxim Huerta – 2018
- Minister of Territorial Policy and Civil Service – Miquel Iceta – 2021–2023

==== Autonomous regional parliament members ====
- Minister of Health of Catalonia – Antoni Comín i Oliveres (Together for Yes) – 2016
- Minister of Culture of Catalonia – Santi Vila (Together For Yes – CDC) – c. 2017
- Minister of Culture and Education of Galicia – Jesús Vázquez Abad (People's Party of Galicia) – 2007–2015
- Member of the Parliament of Catalonia – Miquel Iceta PSC – 1999 [First openly gay male]
- Member of the Basque Parliament – Iñaki Oyarzábal – 1996 [Secretary General of the Spanish People's Party of the Basque Country, 2008–2014. He is member of the Senate of Spain since 2016.]
- Member of the Assembly of Extremadura – Víctor Casco – 2014
- Member of the Assembly of Madrid – Carla Antonelli – 2011 [First transgender woman and LGBT rights activist who was instrumental in the approval of the Spanish Gender Identity Law.]
- Member of the Corts Valencianes – Fran Ferri (spokesman of Coalició Compromís) – 2011

=== Sweden ===
- Member of Parliament – Kent Carlsson (s) – 1991 [Came out: 1991]
- Member of Parliament – Elisebeht Markström (s) – 1995 [Came out publicly: 2006]
- Minister of the Environment – Andreas Carlgren – 2006
- Minister of Migration Affairs – Tobias Billström – 2006 [First bisexual male]
- Minister for Schooling – Lina Axelsson Kihlblom – 2021 [First transgender person in a cabinet]

=== Switzerland ===
- Member of Parliament – Claude Janiak – 1999 [First openly gay male]
- Member of Parliament – Marianne Huguenin – 2003 [Came out: 2004]
- President of the National Council – Claude Janiak – 2005–2006
- Speaker of House of Representatives – Claude Janiak – 2006
- Cantonal Governments (Member of the Executive Council of Bern) – Bernhard Pulver – 2006
- Mayor (Zurich) – Corine Mauch – 2009 [First openly gay mayor of a large Swiss city]
- Cantonal Governments (Member of the Executive Council of St. Gallen) – Martin Klöti – 2012

=== Ukraine ===
- Deputy minister of culture – Ivan Verbytskyi – 2025

== Africa ==
=== Mauritius ===
- Deputy Prime Minister of Mauritius – Gaëtan Duval – 1976 & 1983

=== South Africa ===
- High Court Judge – Edwin Cameron – 1995
- Member of Parliament – Mike Waters – 1999
- Constitutional Court Justice – Edwin Cameron – 2008
- Provincial Premier – Lynne Brown – 2009
- Member of Parliament – Zakhele Mbhele – 2014
- Cabinet minister – Lynne Brown – 2014
- Municipal Councillor – Dimakatso Moloisane – 2015
- Mayor – Chris Pappas – 2021

=== Tunisia ===
- Leader of a political party (Tunisian Liberal Party) – Mounir Baatour – 2011

== Asia ==
=== Hong Kong ===
- Legislative Council Member – Raymond Chan Chi-chuen – 2012 [First openly gay man]
- District Council Member — Jimmy Sham, Kenneth Cheung, and Alice Wei — 2019 [First openly gay and lesbian councillors]

=== India ===
- Member of the Legislative Assembly (Madhya Pradesh) – Shabnam Mausi – 2000–2003 [First transgender person to be elected to public office]
- Mayor (Raigarh, Chhattisgarh) – Madhu Bai Kinnar – 4 January 2015 [First transgender mayor of a city]
- Member of Parliament (Rajya Sabha) – Menaka Guruswamy – 2026–present

=== Israel ===
- Member of Knesset (Parliament) – Uzi Even – 2003 [First openly gay male]
- Member of Knesset (Parliament) – Nitzan Horowitz (Meretz) – 2008
- Member of Knesset (Parliament) – Itzik Shmuli (Israeli Labor Party) – 2013
- Member of Knesset (Parliament) – Amir Ohana (Likud) – 2015
- Mayor and Minister of Communicattions – Eitan Ginzburg – 2018 (mayor)/minister (2021)
- City councillor (Tel-Aviv) – Michal Eden – 1998 [First openly elected lesbian female]
- City councillor (Tel-Aviv) – Itai Pinkas (2003) and Yaniv Weizman (2008) [First openly elected gay males respectively]
- City councillor (Jerusalem) – Saar Netanel – 2003
- City councillor (Yavne) – Ronit Ehrenfreund – 2003
- Minister – Amir Ohana – 2019.
- Leader of a political party (Meretz) – Nitzan Horowitz – 2019 [First openly gay male]
- Deputy mayor of Tel Aviv – Chen Arieli – 2019
- Speaker of the Knesset – Amir Ohana – 2022

=== Japan ===
- Ward councillor (Setagaya, Tokyo) – Aya Kamikawa – 2003 [First transgender woman]
- Prefectural assembly member (Osaka) – Kanako Otsuji – 2005 [First openly lesbian woman]
- Ward councillor (Tokyo) – Taiga Ishikawa (Toshima) and Wataru Ishizaka (Nakano) – 2011 [First elected gay men]
- Member of the House of Councillors (Upper House) – Kanako Otsuji – 2013 [First openly lesbian woman]
- City councillor (Iruma, Saitama) – Tomoya Hosoda – 2017 [First transgender man]
- Member of the Diet (Lower House) – Kanako Otsuji – 2017 [First openly lesbian woman]
- City councillor (Kameoka, Kyoto) – Maria Akasaka – 2019 [First transgender female]
- Prefectural assembly member (Hokkaido) – Ayako Fuchigami – 2019 [First transgender woman]
- Member of the House of Councillors (Upper House) – Taiga Ishikawa – 2019 [First openly gay man]

=== Macau ===
- Chairperson of a political party (New Macau Association) – Jason Chao – 2010 [First openly gay male]

=== Nepal ===
- Constituent Assembly Member – Sunil Babu Pant – 2008 [First openly gay male]

=== Philippines ===
- Province Mayor (Municipality of Leyte, Leyte) – Arnold James Ysidoro – 1998–2004; 2010
- Province Mayor (Municipality of Palapag, Northern Samar) – Florencio "Fawa" Abobo Batula – 2013 [First transgender woman]
- Province Vice Mayor – Geefre "Kalay" Alonsabe – 2022–present " [First openly gay man]
- Board Member of 2nd District of Northern Samar Province – Florencio "Fawa" Abobo Batula – 2013–2016
- City Councilor (Mandaue City) – Wenceslao Gakit – 1998–2007
- Board Member of Sixth District of Cebu Province – Wenceslao Gakit – 2007–2010
- City Councilor (Pasay) – Justo Justo (Panfilo C Justo) – c. 1980s
- Barangay Capitan of Angeles IV (Tayabas, Quezon Province) – Ruvic Rea – 2001 [First transgender woman]
- House of Representatives – Geraldine Roman – 2016 [First transgender woman elected to Congress]

=== Sri Lanka ===
- Member of the Sri Lanka Parliament – Mangala Samaraweera – 1989 [First openly gay male]
- Minister – Mangala Samaraweera – 2005 [First openly gay male]
- Governor – Niluka Ekanayake – 2016 [World's first transgender female Governor]

=== Taiwan ===
- Minister without Portfolio – Audrey Tang – 2016 [World's first transgender minister without portfolio]
- Member of the Legislative Yuan – Huang Jie – 2024

=== Thailand ===
- MP of House of Representatives of Mueang Nan District on the Provincial Administration Organization for Nan Province – Yollada Suanyot – 2012.
- MP of House Representatives – Tanwarin Sukkhapisit – 2019. [first openly transgender]

== Oceania ==
=== Guam ===
- Lieutenant Governor – Josh Tenorio – 2019
- Supreme Court Justice – Benjamin Cruz – 1997 [Came out: 1995]
- Chief Justice – Benjamin Cruz −1999–2001
- Member of Legislature – Benjamin Cruz – 2004

=== New Zealand ===
- Member of Parliament (Parliament for Raglan / Parliament for Waipa) – Marilyn Waring (National) – 1975–1984 [Outed: 1975; Officially came out: after 1984]
- Member of Parliament (Parliament for Te Atatū) – Chris Carter (Labour) – 1993–2011 [First openly gay male]
- Mayor – Georgina Beyer (Labour) – 1995–1999 [World's first openly transgender mayor]
- Member of Parliament – Georgina Beyer (Labour) – 1999–2007 [World's first openly transgender member of parliament]
- Member of Parliament – Maryan Street (Labour) – 2005–2014 [First openly lesbian female elected to parliament]
- Minister of Conservation – Chris Carter (Labour) – 2002–2007
- Minister of Ethnic Affairs – Chris Carter (Labour) – 2002–2008
- Minister of Local Government – Chris Carter (Labour) – 2002–2005
- Minister for Building Issues – Chris Carter (Labour) – 2004–2005
- Minister of Education - Chris Carter (Labour) – 2007–2008
- Minister Responsible for the Education Review Office – Chris Carter (Labour) – 2007–2008
- Minister of Housing and Minister of ACC – Maryan Street (Labour) – 2007–2008
- Attorney-General (New Zealand) and Minister for Treaty of Waitangi Negotiations – Chris Finlayson (National) – 2008–2017 (Male)
- District Court of New Zealand – Bill Hastings (judge) 2010 (Male)
- High Court of New Zealand – Michael Muir (High Court Judge) 2014 (Male)
- Minister of Finance – Grant Robertson (Labour) – 2017 (Male)
- Party leader – Damian Light (United Future) – 2017
- Deputy Prime Minister – Grant Robertson (Labour) – 2020 (Male)

== See also ==
- List of LGBTQ firsts by year
  - List of LGBTQ firsts by year (2010s)
- List of transgender political office-holders
