= Adriana Córdoba =

Colombian politician

Secretary of Planning of Bogotá
- In office January 1, 2020 – December 30, 2020
- Mayor: Claudia López
- Preceded by: Andrés Ortiz Gómez
- Succeeded by: María Mercedes Jaramillo

First Lady of Bogotá
- In role January 1, 2001 – December 31, 2003
- Mayor: Antanas Mockus
- Preceded by: Liliana Sánchez
- Succeeded by: Marcela Hernández
- In role January 1, 1995 – April 10, 1997
- Mayor: Antanas Mockus
- Preceded by: Clara Forero de Castro
- Succeeded by: Cristina Dimaté de Bromberg

Personal details
- Born: Adriana Córdoba Alvarado; October 18, 1969 (age 57) Bogotá, D.C., Colombia
- Party: Green Alliance
- Spouse: Antanas Mockus (m. 1996)
- Education: University College of Cundinamarca (BSc)

Adriana Córdoba Alvarado (born October 18, 1969) is a Colombian social worker, consultant, and politician who served as Secretary of Planning of Bogotá from January to December 2020 under Mayor Claudia López. A member of the Green Alliance party, she also served as First Lady of Bogotá from 1995 to 1997 and again from 2001 until 2003, as the wife of Mayor Antanas Mockus. She is the first person to serve in this role for two non-consecutive terms.

Born in Bogotá, D.C., she graduated in social work from the University College of Cundinamarca. In 2023, she was appointed Colombian Ambassador to Denmark by President Gustavo Petro, an offer she later declined.

Honorary titles
Preceded by Clara Forero de Castro	First Lady of Bogotá; 1995-1997	Succeeded by Cristina Dimaté de Bromberg
Preceded by Liliana Sánchez	First Lady of Bogotá; 2001-2003	Succeeded by Marcela Hernández
