= First Lady of Bogotá =

Spouse of the Superior Mayor of Bogotá

- Current; Carolina Deik since January 1, 2024
- Style: Mrs. Deik
- Residence: Private residence
- Inaugural holder: Emma Villegas
- Website: Gestión social

The First Lady of Bogotá, is the title held by the social manager of Bogotá, generally the wife of the Mayor of Bogotá, coinciding with the mayor's mandate. The role of the first lady has never been codified or officially defined; according to Colombian regulation, the first lady holds the status of private citizen before the public administration. However, this gives the first lady an additional special role, since, being the wife of the mayor, the first lady of Bogotá has the non-obligatory right to ensure the social policy of Bogotá.

Although traditionally the spouse of the mayor of Bogotá fulfills the functions of Social Manager, these functions can be replaced by another person completely different from his or her spouse, in cases where the mayor is not married or is widowed.

Carolina Deik is the current first lady of Bogotá as wife of the current Superior mayor of Bogotá, Carlos Fernando Galán.

== List ==
Spouses of the mayors of Bogotá
Name	Image	Term	Mayor	Notes	Ref(s)
Emma Villegas		1961-1966	Jorge Gaitán		
Carolina Isakson de Barco		1966-1969	Virgilio Barco		
Luz Marina Botero		1975-1976	Luis Prieto Ocampo		
Olga Pardo de Gaitán		1976-1978	Bernardo Gaitán		
Martha Arango de Durán		1978-1982	Hernando Durán Dussán		
Cecilia Montoya		1984-1985	Rafael de Zubiría		
Gloria Ortega de Sánchez		1986-1988	Julio César Sánchez		
Nohra Puyana de Pastrana		1988-1990	Andrés Pastrana	Promoted mid-year school holidays in Bogotá.	
Lía de Roux		1990-1992	Juan Martín Caicedo	Promoted reading during her husband's administration in Bogotá through the so-called librovías.	
Clara Forero de Castro		1992-1995	Jaime Castro Castro	Born in Bogotá. Graduated from the Del Rosario University as a jurist and lawyer. Served as a magistrate of the Council of State.	
Adriana Córdoba		1995-1997	Antanas Mockus	Served as planning secretary of Bogotá during Claudia López's mayoralty.	
Cristina Dimaté de Bromberg		1997-1998	Paul Bromberg	Born in Bogotá. She was the first to promote the Casa del Teatro program.	
Liliana Sánchez		1998-2000	Enrrique Peñalosa	Born in Bogotá to a Colombian father and a Venezuelan mother, he lived until he was 18 in Caracas, Venezuela.	
Adriana Córdoba		2001-2003	Antanas Mockus	In 2001, after the 2000 Regional elections, she served in the role for the second time, in August 2023 she would be appointed as Ambassador of Colombia to Denmark by Gustavo Petro, a position which she would later not accept.	
Marcela Hernández		2004-2007	Luis Eduardo Garzón	She was born in Villavicencio, Meta. She served as First Lady of Bogotá as the partner of Luis Eduardo Garzón.	
Cristina González		2008-2011	Samuel Moreno	Lawyer graduated from the University of Rosario.	
Verónica Alcocer		2012-2015	Gustavo Petro	Born in Sincelejo, Sucre into a Conservative family.	
Vacant		2015-2019	Enrique Peñalosa	Peñalosa and Liliana Sánchez divorced in 2011; during his second term he was not married, so the role was vacant.	
Angélica Lozano		2019-2023	Claudia López	Lawyer, politician, activist and congresswoman, she is the first bisexual openly spouse to serve as First Lady of Bogotá	
Carolina Deik		2014-present	Carlos Fernando Galán	Born in Barranquilla in 1980, she is a lawyer and university professor. She graduated from Georgetown University and has her own law firm called Deik Acosta-Madiedo Abogados.	

== See also ==
- First lady
