= Verónica Alcocer =

First Lady of Colombia from 2022 to 2026

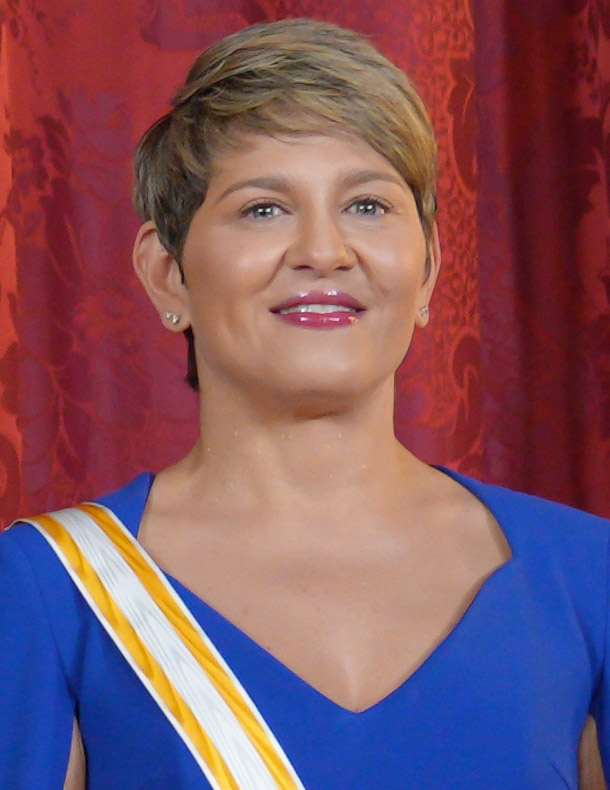
- Alcocer in 2023

First Lady of Colombia
- In role 7 August 2022 – 7 August 2026
- President: Gustavo Petro
- Preceded by: María Juliana Ruiz
- Succeeded by: Ana Lucía Pineda

First Lady of Bogotá
- In role 1 January 2012 – 31 December 2015 (Note: Her husband was suspended from 19 March to 23 April 2014, but she did not attend to her duties as first lady of Bogotá)
- Mayor: Gustavo Petro
- Preceded by: Cristina González
- Succeeded by: Angélica Lozano (2019)

Personal details
- Born: Verónica del Socorro Alcocer García; 26 May 1976 (age 50) Sincelejo, Sucre, Colombia
- Party: Historic Pact (2025–present)
- Other political affiliations: Humane Colombia (2011–2025)
- Spouse: Gustavo Petro (m. 2000; div. 2026)
- Children: Nicolás; Sofía; Antonella
- Parents: Jorge Emilio Alcocer (father); Elisabeth García (mother)
- Relatives: Petro family

Verónica del Socorro Alcocer García (born 26 May 1976) is Colombian social issues advocate who was served as First Lady of Colombia from 2022 to 2026. She was married to Gustavo Petro, the 36th president of Colombia, from 2000 to 2026. Previously, she served as First Lady of Bogotá from 2012 to 2015. She is the third wife of a Mayor of Bogotá to become First Lady since Nohra Puyana de Pastrana in 1998.

Verónica Alcocer was born in Sincelejo. She met Gustavo Petro in 2000 at the age of 20, and the two married in December of that year. That same year, they moved to Bogotá, D.C., where Petro already had an established political career. The couple had two children between 2002 and 2005. She had previously become a mother in 1996 to her eldest son, Nicolás. She has actively supported her husband in his political career, campaigning alongside him during his 2011 mayoral campaign in Bogotá. Alcocer became the First Lady of Bogotá after her husband's victory in the 2011 regional elections. As First Lady, she assumed the role of social gestor of the city.

Alcocer became First Lady in 2022 after her husband was inaugurated as president. Her role as First Lady diverged from the mold established by her predecessors, as she had, for the first time, her own agenda, separate from that of the president. Diplomacy and strategic negotiation became their greatest allies in promoting social causes such as the eradication of sexual violence against children, child malnutrition, and access to healthcare for low-income people.

== Early life, education and marriage ==
Verónica del Socorro Alcocer García was born 26 May 1976 in Sincelejo, Sucre grew up in a Conservative family in Sincelejo, born to Jorge Emilio Alcocer (1943–2012) and Elisabeth García de Alcocer. Her father was the son of Sucre politician José Eustorgio Alcocer, two-time mayor of Sincelejo. Verónica's middle name was del Socorro in honor of the Virgin of Socorro, a saint to whom her parents have traditionally been devoted.

As a child, Verónica dreamed of becoming a nun, showing a keen interest in helping without reward. As a teenager, she began studying law at the Caribbean University Corporation, a degree she would postpone twice and ultimately never complete.

She met politician Gustavo Petro in April 2000. They met while he was giving a conference at the Caribbean University Corporation. Although he was almost twenty years her senior, she was impressed by his intelligence. During their first date, her father and uncle made it their mission to get to know him beforehand. Meanwhile, she was struggling with the stigma of being a single mother.

Veronica and Gustavo Petro were married on 17 December 2000, in a private ceremony in Bogotá, D.C. The wedding took place months after Gustavo's divorce from Mary Luz Herrán. Petro raised Veronica's eldest son, Nicolás, as his own and formally adopted him in 2022.

Despite being the wife of a left-wing president, Alcocer has expressed on multiple occasions her devotion to the Catholic faith and her personal views against abortion, without expressing her repudiation of the right to abortion.

== Role in 2022 presidential campaign ==
Alcocer was characterized by being potentially active during Gustavo Petro's presidential campaign, which was unprecedented, since traditionally no spouse of a political candidate in the history of Colombia had carried out politics as a couple along with her husband, which allowed her to obtain consistent leadership as well as a positive image from the female population towards their husband.

In June 2022, a series of secretly recorded videos of private meetings of Petro's presidential campaign were leaked, in one of which Alcocer was heard saying that all female journalists slept their way to the top. Alcocer later apologized, saying that the recordings were "taken out of context" and did not represent her ideas.

== First Lady of Colombia (2022–2026) ==
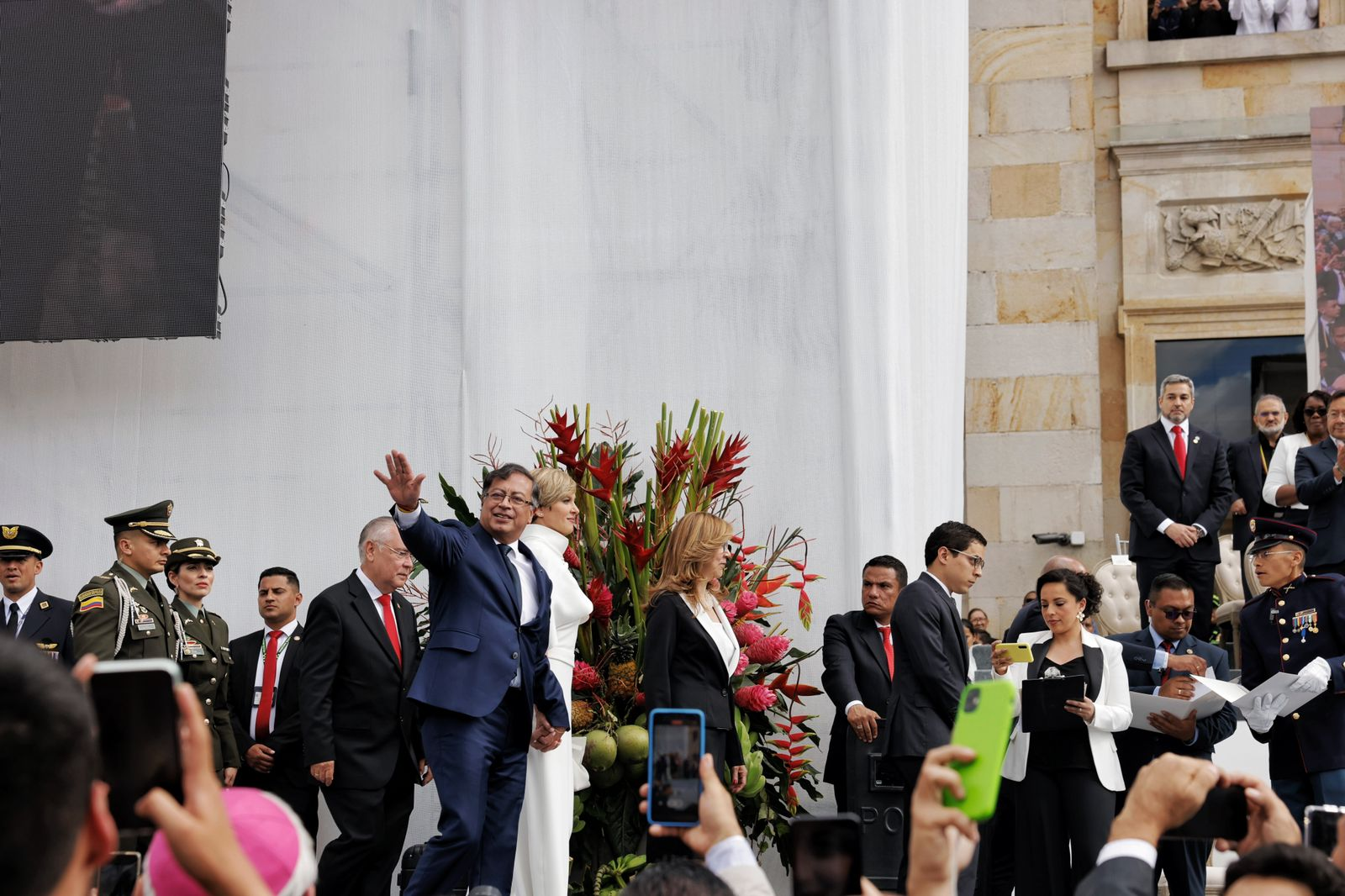
Alcocer during her husband's inauguration on 7 August 2022.

Verónica became the third first lady to have also served as first lady of Bogotá, on 7 August 2022, during Petro's inauguration. She had previously stated that, from her position, she had viewed the role as "historically detached from the needs of the people."

=== Domestic initiatives and activities ===
During the heavy storms of November 2022, Alcocer was active in emergency response; on November 8, she landed in Cartagena and led a Unified Command Post which also involved Mayor William Dau the governor of Bolívar, Vicente Blel, the Minister of Labor, Gloria Inés Ramírez, the governor of Atlántico, Elsa Noguera, the general director of Social Prosperity, Cielo Rusinque the Minister of the Interior, Alfonso Prada and the director of the Risk Management Unit, Javier Pava.

On 24 May 2023 she traveled to La Guajira, to meet the indigenous communities in Uribia and Manaure, where she observed and listened to the main complaints of the inhabitants of these remote areas of the country, as well as promising to be a voice from the people to the government.

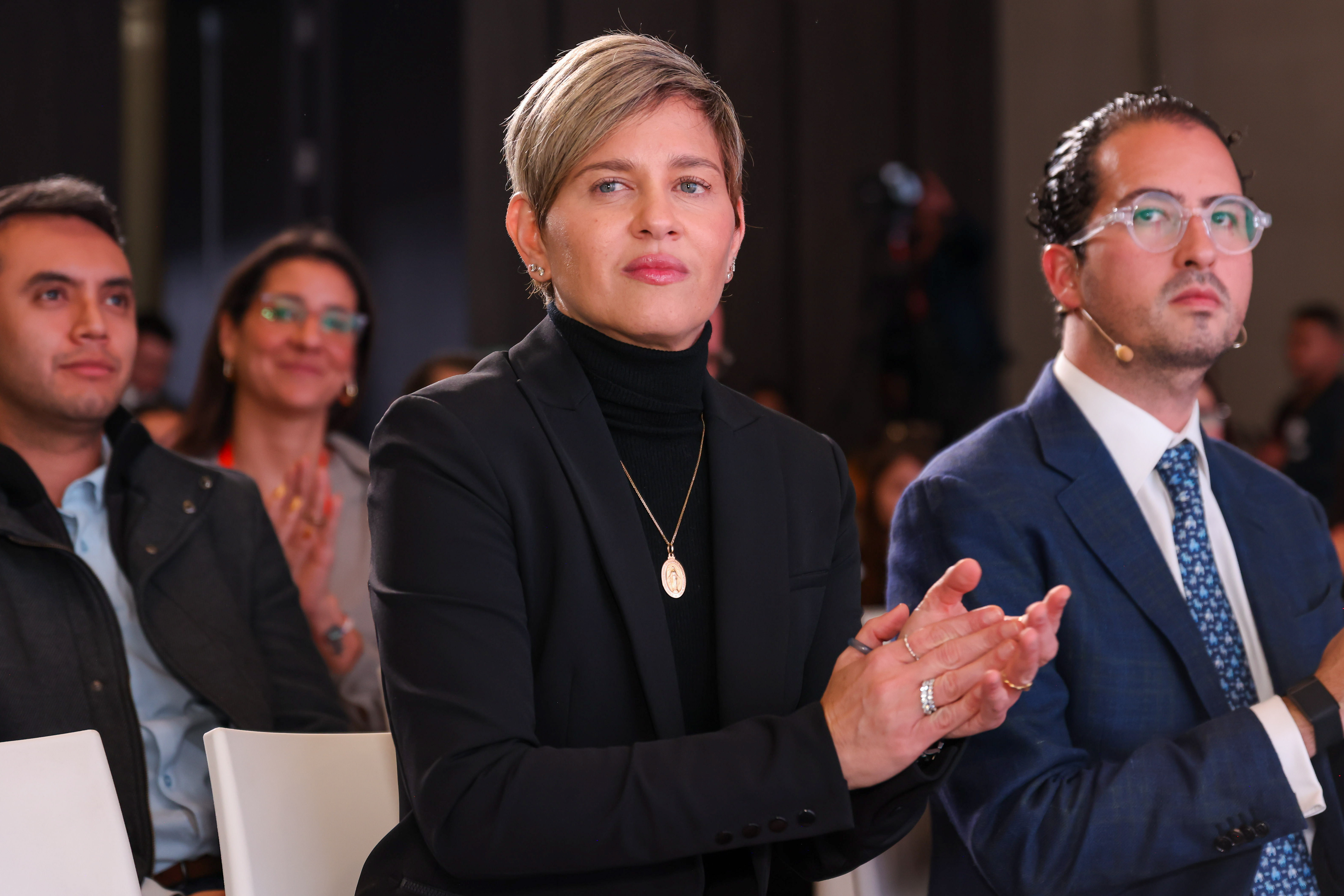
Verónica Alcocer during the event to eradicate sexual violence in childhood on 7 November 2024

On 7 November 2024, she attended the event against the eradication of sexual violence against children. During her speech, she stated that making solutions visible for children is her main objective.

=== Policy initiatives ===
Alcocer has been the most politically active first lady since Bertha Hernández de Ospina.

Alcocer's first official act as First Lady took place on the morning of Monday, 8 August 2022, when she declared her support for and subsequently signed the gender equality bills to be presented in Congress by the congresswomen of the Historic Pact for Colombia. In April 2023, she joined as a spectator the debates in Congress on the Health reform proposed by the Petro administration, where minutes before she held a private meeting with Ministers Carolina Corcho of Health and Alfonso Prada of the Interior, in the company of Representative to the Chamber Agmeth Escaf as well as some other members of the Historic Pact bench where she discussed some points of the reform and shared her points of view.

On 7 June, two months later, he would again attend the debate on pension reform. Later, he would participate in the marches called by the Petro administration in support of the health and pension reforms.

=== Foreign trips and activities ===
On 7 September 2022, she visited PRIO in Oslo, Norway, to learn how Norway has organized its commitment to peace around the world, with a particular focus on women's inclusion and gender perspectives. On 19 September 2022, Alcocer and foreign minister Álvaro Leyva attended Queen Elizabeth's funeral held at Westminster Abbey, London.

On 19 September 2022 she traveled to Japan in the company of the Minister of Foreign Affairs to attend the state funeral of former Prime Minister Shinzo Abe.

On 29 September 2022, Alcocer had the opportunity to meet with Yuko Kishida, wife of the Japanese Prime Minister, Fumio Kishida; they spoke on culture and gender equality, as well as cooperation between both countries for means of friendly development between the two countries.

In October 2022, she traveled to Oslo, Norway, for the second time. She visited the House of Human Rights with the director of the Oslo Crisis Center, Lise Walmsness Larsen. She presented the Order of Boyacá Cross to former Norwegian ambassador John Petter Opdahl.

On 14 January 2023, Alcocer traveled to Vatican City on behalf of her husband, to hold a 30-minute audience in the Library of the Apostolic Palace with Pope Francis. Among the points discussed in the audience, both discussed domestic, the abuse of women and children in Colombia. The event ended with an invitation from Alcocer to the Pope to visit Colombia.

On 31 January 2023, Alcocer traveled to Caracas, Venezuela, where she held a meeting with Nicolás Maduro's wife, Cilia Flores. The main topic of the meeting was the reinforcement of bilateral relations between Colombia and Venezuela. She also had a private meeting. with the President of Venezuela, Nicolás Maduro.

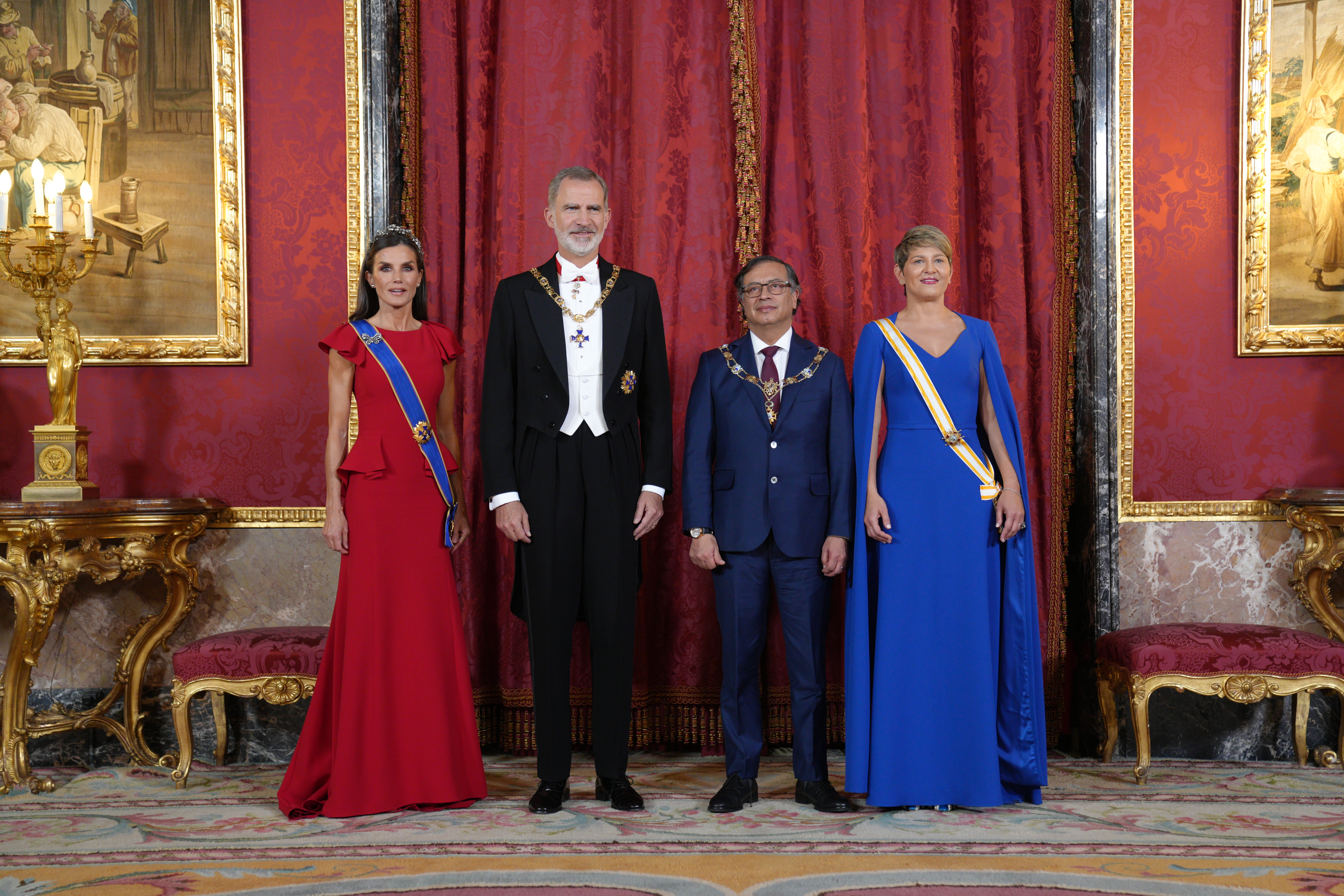
Verónica Alcocer and Gustavo Petro with The King and Queen of Spain.

On 3 May 2023, Alcocer and Petro made a state visit to Spain, as part of Petro's agenda, in which they discussed the central axes of Petro administration, such as global warming, education and Total Peace.

On 6 May 2023, Alcocer and the Minister of Foreign Affairs, Álvaro Leyva, travelled to London as representatives of the Colombian government at the Coronation of Charles III and Camilla.

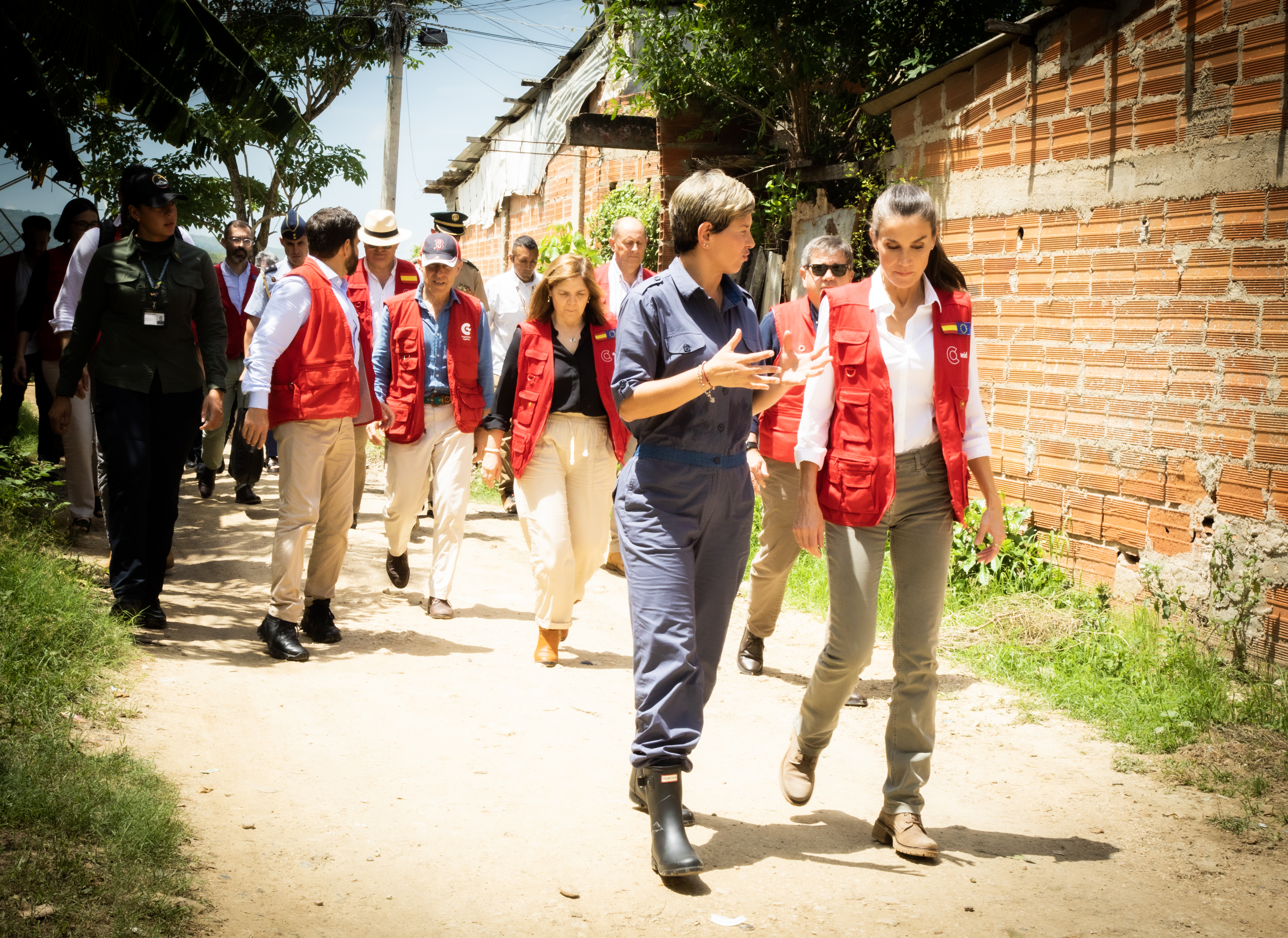
Verónica Alcocer with Queen Letizia of Spain at Cartagena, Colombia.

On 12 June 2023, Alcocer received Queen Letizia of Spain who arrived in Cartagena, Colombia, as part of her agenda with the Spanish Agency for International Development Cooperation.

In November 2023, she traveled to Venezuela for the second time together with the president, who met with the President of Venezuela Nicolás Maduro to discuss migration, energy transition and climate change.

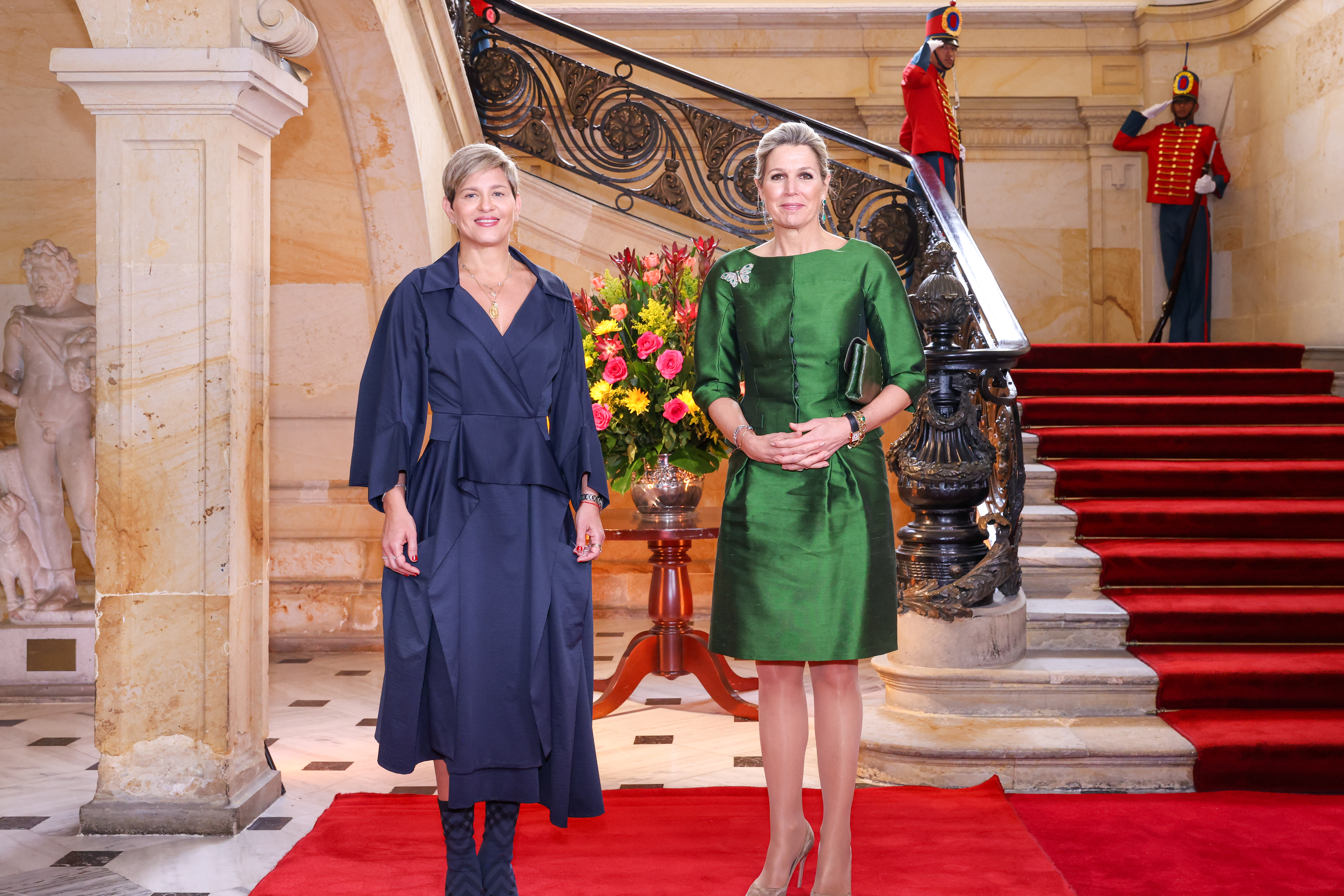
Verónica Alcocer with The Queen of the Netherlands.

On 29 February 2024, she received Queen Maxima of the Netherlands at the Casa de Nariño, to later meet with President Gustavo Petro.

On 13 June 2024, she traveled together with the president to Sweden for a state visit between Sweden and Colombia. On 15 June 2024, she held a meeting with representatives of the Ancla Foundation, the organization Grupo Colombia and the Swedish Human Rights Foundation where development projects were agreed for the benefit of children, cornflowers, women and the population of La Guajira.

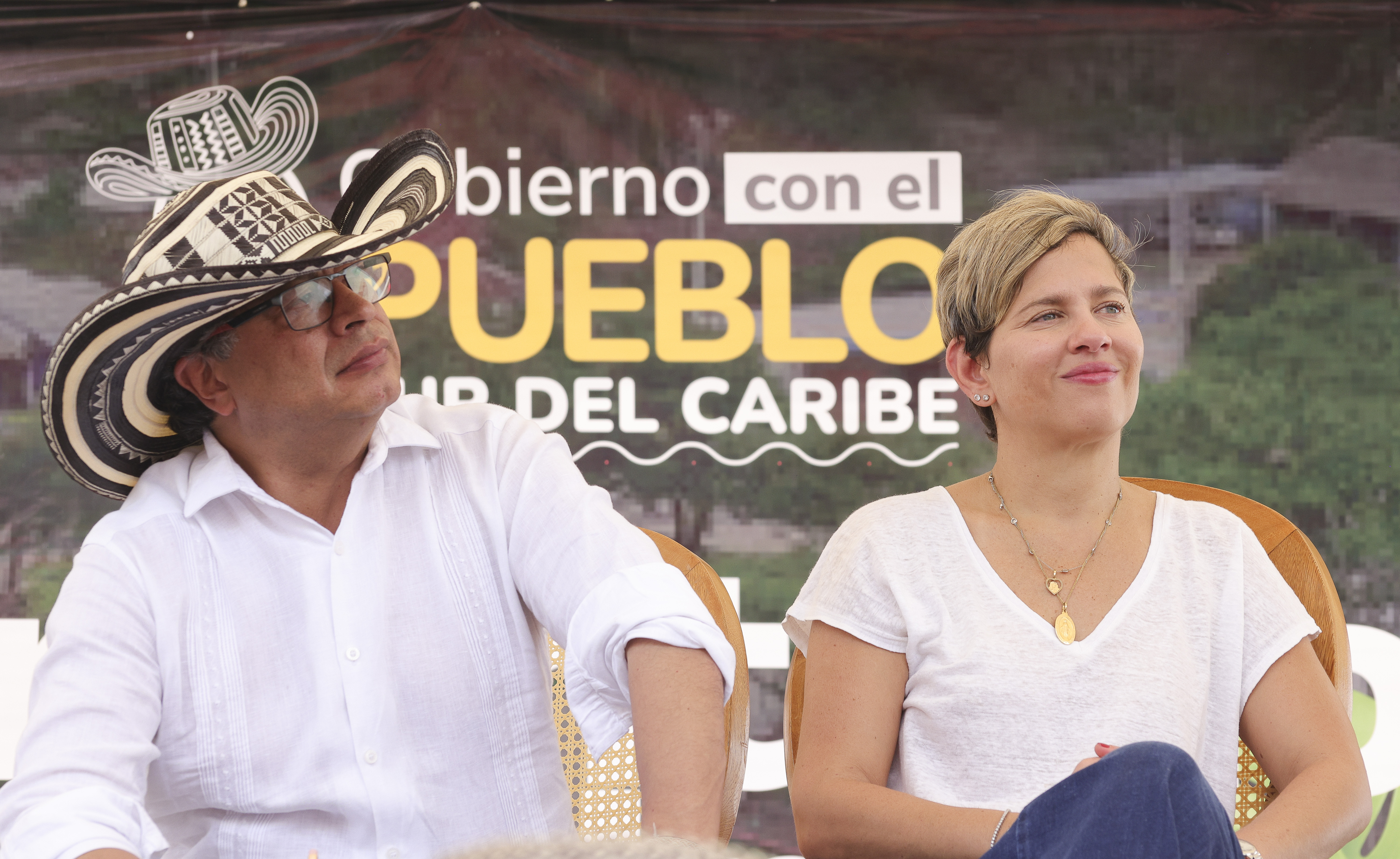
Verónica Alcocer with Gustavo Petro during the delivery of lands from the Petro administration in Sucre.

On 23 July 2024, traveled with her husband to France, where they both held a meeting with Brigitte Macron, wife of the president of France, and later attend the Opening Ceremony of the 2024 Summer Olympics in Paris. In February 2025, she traveled as a special guest to the Zayed Prize in Abu Dhabi, United Arab Emirates. On 26 April 2025, she represented the government during the funeral for Pope Francis.

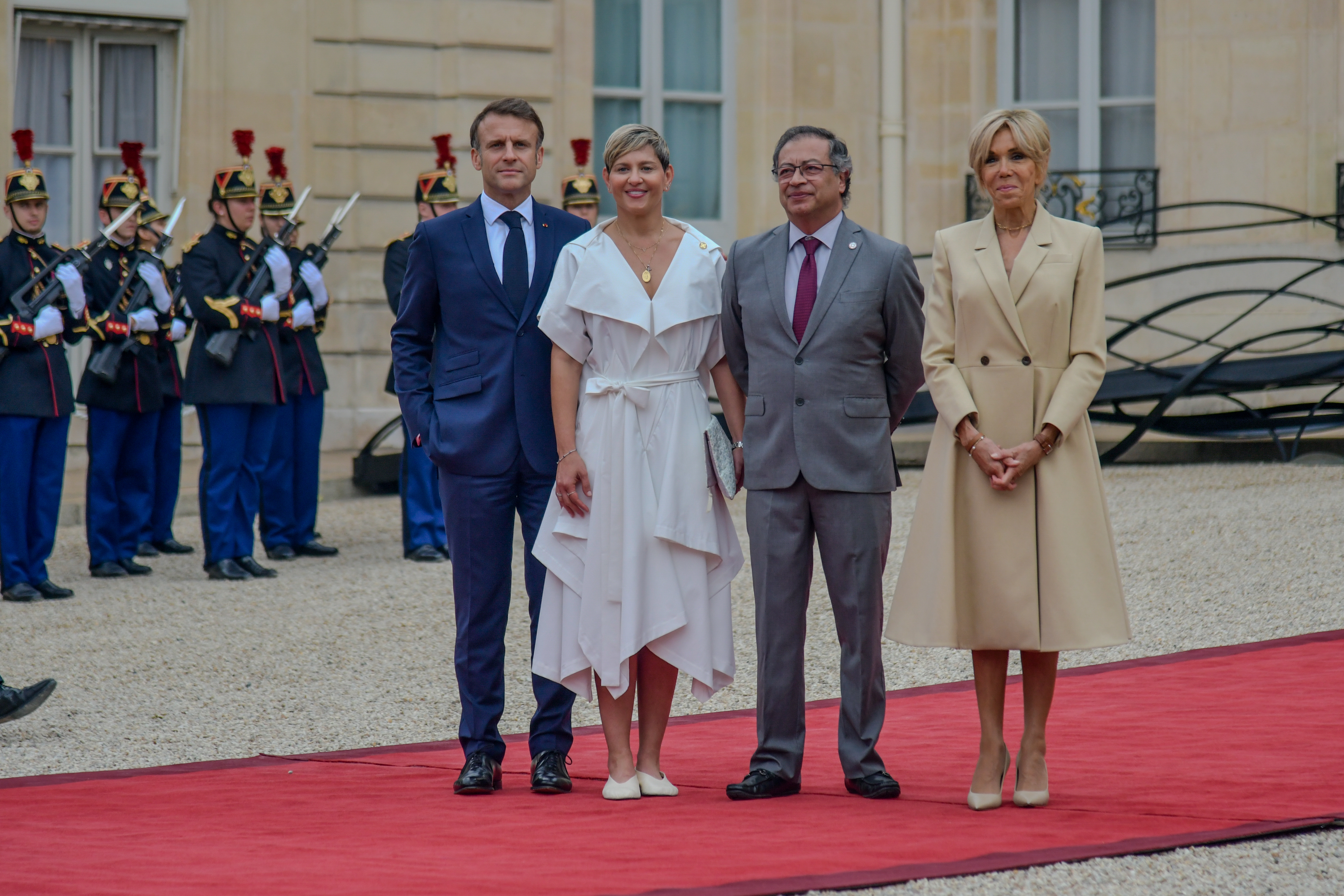
Verónica Alcocer with President Gustavo Petro alongside the President of France Emmanuel Macron and Brigitte Macron during the 2024 Summer Olympics in Paris.

Alcocer played a leading role in Colombia's international diplomacy, unlike her predecessors, breaking with the social patterns that have traditionally been marked for the role of first lady, with an independent and leading agenda outside of that of her husband. He led negotiations, representation delegations, international strategic alliances and high-level meetings of a social and reconciliatory nature.

=== International agenda ===
From 17 to 20 June 2024, traveled to Switzerland where, among his various meetings, he held meetings with the Nestlé Foundation, as well as with Mirko Giulietti, head of the Americas Division, in which it was agreed to launch a pilot phase to improve child nutrition in vulnerable areas of Colombia and initiatives for better access to drinking water in La Guajira. Later he met with the Colombian community in Switzerland and would hold a meeting with Kelly Clements, Deputy High Commissioner of UNHCR, and Christian Salazar, director of field operations and technical cooperation of the United Nations High Commissioner for Human Rights, with the in order to strengthen international cooperation. In September 202 he traveled to China at the invitation of Colombo-China Friendship Association, where she advanced her work agenda focused on cooperation in education projects for youth and gender equality. She met with the Vice Minister of Foreign Affairs, Hua Chunying and the Vice President of the National Women's Federation, Lin Yi. On 23 October 2024, she traveled to Vatican City for the second time to hold a meeting with Pope Francis and later participate in the recitation of the Angelus in St. Peter's Square.

On 21–26 November 2024, an invitation made by the First Lady of Egypt Entissar Amer, the Minister of Social Solidarity, Maya Morsi and the Deputy Prime Minister of Human Development and Minister of Health and Population, Khaled Abdelghaffar. They exchanged knowledge and experiences around social protection and services aimed at children and families. Later he met with the Grand Imam of Al-Azhar, Ahmed el-Tayeb, with whom he shared messages focused on peace. The trip ended with a visit to the National Council of Women of Egypt.

=== Approval ratings, popularity and controversy ===
Within a week of assuming her role, Alcocer drew criticism from both her husband's supporters and detractors for adopting a white savior attitude towards the Afro-Colombian community. Alcocer has faced criticism from her detractors, who on multiple occasions have accused her of seeking to monopolize the functions and obligations of a public office; detractors have also claimed that the title of First Lady is a burden, merely protocol and ceremonial.

In September 2022, vice president Francia Márquez expressed that her relationship with the President was strong. She also stated that she herself had refused the possibility of attending the funeral of the Queen Elizabeth II, saying that when the Minister of Foreign Affairs had proposed her to represent Colombia at the funeral she said she was not interested in attending the funeral of a representative of African oppression and slavery, taking as a reference that Great Britain was one of the most extensive colonial empires that oppressed the African race for many years, Marquez urged the media and the nation to take for granted that she was chosen to represent Afro-Colombians of her nation and to contribute from her position to the construction of peace.

In February 2023, Alcocer joined the celebration of the Carnival of Barranquilla; this was the first time that a First Lady in office participated in this event. Alcocer had previously been the target of criticism for the celebrations held on the night of August 7 after the presidential inauguration of her husband, where videos were leaked in which she appeared dancing to the rhythm of cumbia, fandango and porro, native sounds of Córdoba and Sucre, native departments of the presidential couple.

Alcocer was harshly criticized, after a series of videos were leaked during her stay in Madrid, in which she made funny faces while the national anthem was playing, which was classified by some as disrespectful and rude, at the same time she was criticized for dancing in the street to the rhythm of the native mapalé dance from the Pacific region of Colombia, performed by a group of Colombian musicians based in Spain.

In January 2024, Alcocer was a trend, after it was known through an investigation carried out by the newspaper La Silla Vacia the budget allocated to its private staff, which included transportation, makeup artist, fashion advisor and photographer, this news caused great controversy, since a first lady is not a public servant, which caused different opinions from different sectors.

In June 2024, Alcocer denounced a campaign to smear her name by members of the Petro administration. Through a press release, Alcocer asked the Attorney General, Luz Adriana Camargo, to investigate the disinformation campaign against her.

In January 2025, She participated with her daughter Sofía in the Celebrations of Saint Francis of Assisi, in Sincelejo, Sucre.

In September 2025, her public absence would become a source of speculation among the public. In November 2025, Alcocer was approached by the Swedish newspaper Expressen while walking through the streets of Stockholm hand in hand with her youngest daughter, Antonella, and the Spanish businessman Manuel Grau. She had established her residence at the Strand Hotel in Stockholm.

=== Fashion and style ===
On the day of the presidential election, Alcocer chose black pants with a blue wool vest. When she voted for her husband, she inspired everything from memes to analysis of what her four years in this position will be like.

On 7 August 2022, for her husband's inauguration, Alcocer used a design made up of a jumpsuit chosen for the occasion and designed exclusively for her. One detail included a brooch with the image of the Virgin of the Miraculous, symbol of devotion and faith; this was made in Santa Cruz de Mompox by designer Virgilio Madinah, and brought together faith and indigenous heritage.

Alcocer seeks to showcase the work of Colombian artisans, appearing in public with items such as Metalero handmade jewelry, a bag by designer Adriana Ureta and gift shoes from Norberto and Antonio.

During her state visit to unlink Spain in May 2023, she stood out for her use of practical ethnic outfits, representative of Colombian culture, especially with the use of symbolism of the colors fungi and white.

For her arrival at the Palacio Real de Madrid on 3 May 2023, Alcocer wore an ecru crepe dress, 100 percent wool, decorated with handcrafted appliqués, which were made by Diana Chirimía, from the Embera katío tribe. The fabrics were decorated with beads, by the indigenous embera Gladys Nacavera Güipa, while Cali designer Andres Totalora oversaw the completion of the ensemble.

While representing Colombia at the Coronation of Charles III, which she attended with the Minister of Foreign Affairs, Álvaro Leyva, she wore a white dress with headdresses of unlink blue flowers, complemented with an unlink pale pink hat.

== Public image ==
Alcocer's public interactions began to be numerous, especially when she appeared individually, without depending on her husband's schedule as has traditionally been the case for first ladies in Colombia. The public sees Alcocer as an unconventional first lady.

Over the years during the Petro administration, her interactions and public presence diminished rapidly, prompting speculation about her relationship with President Gustavo Petro. This speculation was later confirmed by the president in November 2025, after he, along with her and several other members of the Petro administration, was included on the Specially Designated Nationals and Blocked Persons List by US President Donald Trump in response to their actions against the Trump administration's anti-drug policies. President Gustavo Petro described Alcocer as a free woman, considering this action extremely unjust.

== Notes ==
Honorary titles
Preceded by Cristina González	First Lady of Bogotá; 2012–2015	Vacant Title next held by Angélica Lozano
Preceded by María Juliana Ruiz	First Lady of Colombia; 2022–2026	Succeeded by Ana Lucía Pineda
