= City of Borders =

2009 film

- Directed by: Yun Suh
- Written by: Yun Suh
- Produced by: Yun Suh; Karin Thayer; Simone Nelson
- Cinematography: Karin Thayer; Robin Mckenna
- Edited by: Jean Kawahara
- Release date: 2009
- Country: United States
- Languages: English, Arabic, Hebrew

City of Borders is a 2009 documentary film by Korean-American director Yun Suh that captures the lives of several patrons who frequented the only gay bar in Jerusalem at the time named Shushan. The film stars primarily Sa'ar Netanel, Boody, Samira Saraya, Ravit Geva, and Adam Russo, whose stories reflect the contemporary resistant attitude towards the LGBT community in Jerusalem. The film premiered on February 6, 2009 at the Berlin International Film Festival, and is now available on DVD.

== Synopsis ==
The crew followed the participants in their daily lives documenting how they navigate the widespread opposition towards their sexual identity.

=== Sa'ar Netanel ===
Sa'ar is the first openly gay member of Jerusalem's City Council, whose political involvement revolves around promoting visibility for the LGBT community in Jerusalem, and creating a safe space for its members to freely express themselves. The latter was materialized when he opened the only gay bar in Jerusalem, named Shushan, where its patrons consider it being the only place that is free of judgment and discrimination towards their sexuality. However, being one of the few openly gay political advocates comes at the price that he has been repeatedly receiving death threats from disproving parties. His mother has also been receiving numerous hate calls in which the callers have equated her son to sub-animals, and accused him of blasphemy. After years of serving on the City Council with such persistent threat, Sa'ar eventually decided to resign from his political position. Shushan was also forced to be closed down due to funding issues, after four years of serving.

=== Boody ===
Boody is a young Palestinian man from Ramallah, who periodically climbs over the fence between Jerusalem and Palestine to go to Shushan where he performs as a drag queen. He is the oldest child in the family. As a result, growing up he had always felt the need to deny his own sexuality as a way to be an example for his younger siblings. Now that he is openly gay, his family knows what used to be his secret. However, his mom still hasn't come to terms with the fact that her son is gay. She believes that it is all in Boody's head, and hopes that he would still marry a woman one day. Mirroring Sa'ar's experience, Boody has been receiving death threats that made him fear of leaving his home. At the end of the film, he eventually moved to the United States where he met his fiancé, Tarek.

=== Samira and Ravit ===
Samira and Ravit are a lesbian couple who have been together for four years. Samira is Palestinian Israeli, and Ravit is Jewish Israeli. They met working in the same hospital where Samira is a nurse, and Ravit is a doctor. Their relationship defies two prominent taboos that in their cultures, namely same-sex relationships and union between Arabs and Jews, which sometimes cause tension between the two lovers. However, despite public and familial opposition, they stay with each other and do what they can politically to bring voices to their much silenced community.

=== Adam Russo ===
Adam is a young Jewish man in love with Amit, an Arab from Palestine. The two met in Shushan, and now they are building a house together in a settlement along the fences that aim to ward off Jews from Palestinians where Adam grew up. During the 2005 Jerusalem gay pride parade, Adam was attacked with a knife three times by one of the protesters. Since then, he has become a spokesperson for the gay pride parade, joining others in making the much-resisted celebration of their sexuality happen every year

== Production ==
The writer, producer, and director of this film, Yun Suh, became interested in the Israeli-Palestinian conflict thanks to her own experiences back in her homeland South Korea. She claims that she identifies with both sides of the war because like Israelis, she was frightened throughout her childhood that North Korea would invade her village; and like Palestinians, she understands their anger as a result of the Japanese occupation. The concept of City of Borders first sprouted when Yun Suh visited Jerusalem doing a series of radio reports, where she learned about the existence of Shushan. But the production of the film did not take shape until 2006, when Suh visited Jerusalem again and contacted Sa'ar upon seeing his number being written on many walls in the city, accusing him of being the man responsible for earthquakes and plagues.

== Awards ==
- Teddy Audience Award, Berlin International Film Festival
- Best International Feature, Vancouver Queer Film Festival
- Best Documentary, Barcelona International Lesbian and Gay Film Festival
- Grand Prix, Belgrade Documentary and Short Film Festival
- Grand Jury Prize, Montreal Human Rights Film Festival
- Best Documentary, Middle East Film Festival, New Orleans
- Winner, Best LGBT Film, Ann Arbor Film Festival
