= David Sánchez Camacho =

Mexican politician

David Sánchez Camacho (born 20 October 1963) is a Mexican politician from Mexico City.

A member of the Party of the Democratic Revolution (PRD) Sánchez serves as deputy in the Mexican Chamber of Deputies to which he was elected in 2006. He had previously been a member of the Legislative Assembly of the Federal District.

Sánchez is one of the few openly gay politicians in México.

== See also ==
- List of the first openly LGBT holders of political offices § Mexico
