= Evelien Eshuis =

Dutch politician (born 1942)

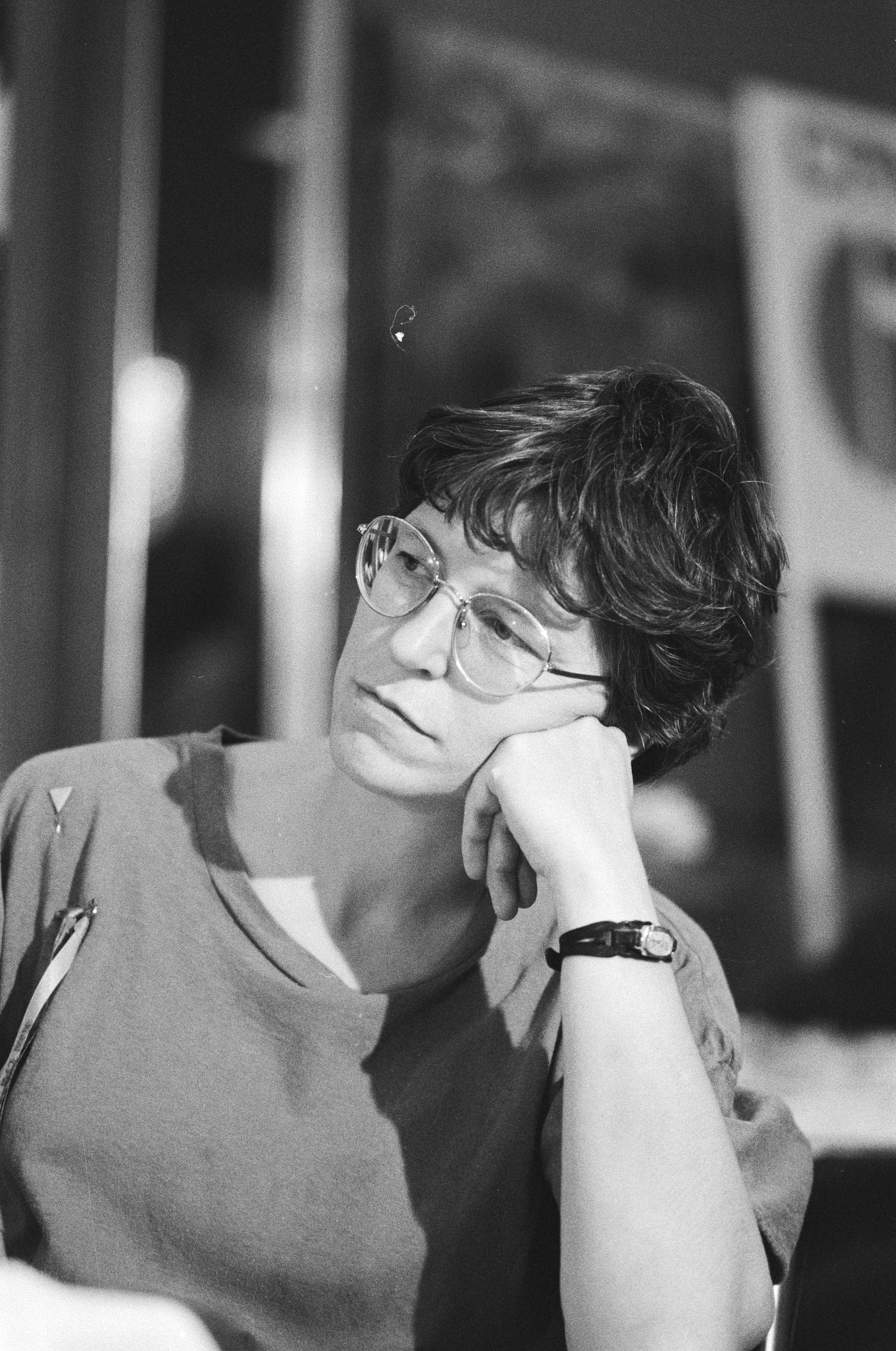
- Eshuis in 1982

Member of the House of Representatives
- In office 16 September 1982 – 3 June 1986

Personal details
- Born: Eveline Luberta Eshuis; 25 November 1942 (age 83) Amersfoort
- Party: CPN
- Education: University of Amsterdam

Eveline Luberta "Evelien" Eshuis (born 25 November 1942) is a Dutch politician who was a member of the House of Representatives in the Netherlands from 1982 to 1986. She was the first openly lesbian member of the Dutch Parliament.

== Biography ==
Eshuis was born on 25 November 1942 in Amersfoort, Netherlands. She was born into a middle-class family, and later attended a school that emancipated the norms and values of rural people. She then attended the University of Amsterdam, where she studied andragology. She worked in Ghana for a year in 1968. From 1972 to 1975, she taught at a social academy in Amsterdam, and she worked at a community center from 1975 to 1982.

During her time as a teacher, she joined the radical feminist movement, which she said she felt directly connected to as she said the people were enthusiastically working to invent the future, but wished for there to be real policy. Eshuis joined the Communist Party of the Netherlands in 1974 and was elected to the House of Representatives in 1982. She came out as lesbian that same year, becoming the first openly lesbian member of Parliament in the Netherlands. Eshuis is described in Trouw as one of the most well-known LGBT politicians in the Netherlands. In Parliament, she regularly wore a pink triangle pin as a symbol of lesbian pride. Eshuis initiated a 1983 inquiry into the shipbuilding company Rijn-Schelde-Verolme after its bankruptcy.

After serving one term in the House of Representatives from 1982 to 1986, she became the secretary of the district council of De Pijp. From 1993 to 2002, she was Amstelveen's director of environment and recreation, and has since worked as a consultant. She is a member of the board of Opzij, a feminist magazine. She has also been a board member of the Schorer Foundation until 2012 which was involved in the mental and physical health care for the LGBT community.

== See also ==
- List of the first LGBT holders of political offices
