= Carolina Deik =

Colombian lawyer (born 1980)

First Lady of Bogotá
- Assumed role January 1, 2024
- Mayor: Carlos Fernando Galán
- Preceded by: Angélica Lozano

Personal details
- Born: Carolina Deik Acosta-Madiedo; September 17, 1980 (age 46) Barranquilla, Atlántico, Colombia
- Party: New Liberalism
- Spouse: Carlos Fernando Galán (m. 2011)
- Education: Pontificia Universidad Javeriana (LLB); Harvard University (LLM); Universidad Externado de Colombia (JD); Sorbonne University (LLD)

Academic background
- Thesis: La Agencia Comercial y su talón de aquiles la Cesantía Comercial (2009)

Carolina Deik Acosta-Madiedo (born September 17, 1980) is a Colombian lawyer and academic who serves as the First Lady of Bogotá since 2024, as the wife of Mayor Carlos Fernando Galán. She is the Principal of the Deik Acosta-Madiedo Law Firm. She has previously served as co-judge of the Council of State and a professor of constitutional, administrative, and public procurement law at the Universidad Externado de Colombia, the University of the Andes, and the Saint Thomas Aquinas University.

== First Lady of Bogotá (2024-present) ==
On January 1, 2024, Deik became the First Lady of Bogotá during the inauguration of Carlos Fernando Galán as Superior Mayor of Bogotá.In July 2024, she led a children's vaccination campaign against the human papillomavirus. Together with the Bogotá Food Bank, she organized a race to collect food for Bogotá's most vulnerable populations. On September 28, 2024, she met with the first ladies of Medellín and Manizales to forge cooperation between the two cities on social policy.

== Notes ==
Honorary titles
| Preceded by Angélica Lozano | First Lady of Bogotá; 2024–present | Current holder |
