= Cristina González de Moreno =

Colombian model and lawyer

First Lady of Bogotá
- In role January 1, 2008 – December 31, 2012
- Mayor: Samuel Moreno
- Preceded by: Marcela Hernández
- Succeeded by: Verónica Alcocer

Personal details
- Born: Cristina González Villegas; 1960 or 1961 (age 64–65) Pereira, Risaralda, Colombia
- Party: Alternative Democratic Pole (2008-2012)
- Spouse: Samuel Moreno (m. 1998; died 2023)
- Children: Mateo; Samuel
- Relatives: María Eugenia Rojas (mother-in-law)
- Education: University of La Sabana (LLB)

Cristina González Villegas de Moreno (born c. 1962) is a Colombian model and lawyer who served as First Lady of Bogotá from 2008 to 2012 during the mayoralty of Samuel Moreno.

Born in Pereira, Risaralda, González de Moreno studied law at the University of La Sabana, where she met Samuel in 1979 when they were taking a class together.

== Early life, education and family ==
Cristina was born in Pereira, Risaralda, and met Samuel Moreno when she was 18 and beginning her first semester of law school at the University of Rosario, where she would initially study. In 2007, she accompanied her husband during his campaign for Superior Mayor of Bogotá and later served as first lady of Bogotá, a position in which she leveraged public relations. Cristina accompanied her husband during his criminal trial and later during his time in prison, where he died on February 10, 2023, due to cardiac arrest.

Honorary titles
Previous: Marcela Hernández	First Lady of Bogotá; 2008–2012	Succeeded by Verónica Alcocer
