= Oras Tynkkynen =

Finnish politician (born 1977)

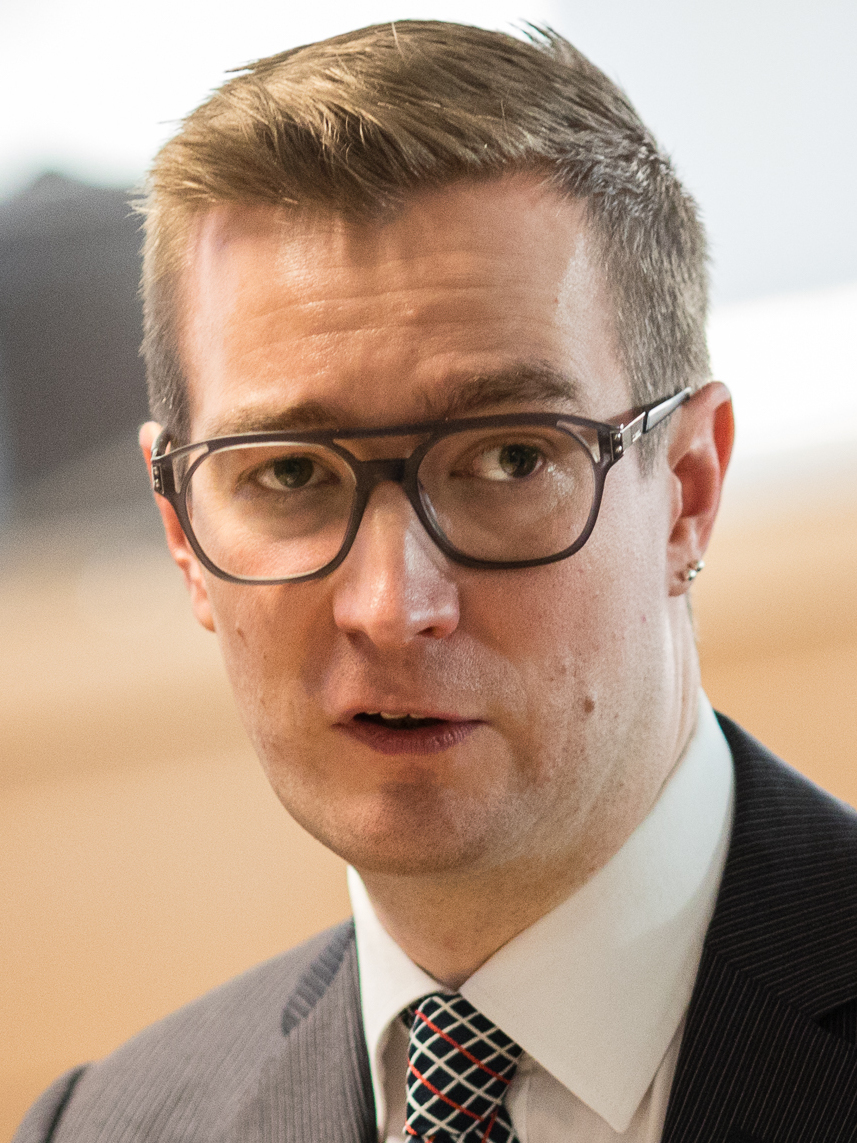
- Tynkkynen in 2020

Member of the Finnish Parliament for Pirkanmaa
- In office 20 July 2004 – 22 April 2015
- Incumbent
- Assumed office 5 April 2023

Personal details
- Born: 25 September 1977 (age 48) Jyväskylä, Finland
- Party: Green League
- Occupation: Journalist
- Profession: Master of Social Sciences
- Website: www.orastynkkynen.fi

Oras Tynkkynen (Topi Oras Kalevi Tynkkynen, born 1977) is a Member of the Parliament of Finland, representing the Green League. Tynkkynen was the chair of the Green parliamentary group. He served as Prime Minister Matti Vanhanen's Advisor on Climate Policy. Also Tynkkynen is a Member of the City Council of Tampere and an environmental activist. He has also held positions in numerous other organisations, such as Friends of the Earth Finland. Oras Tynkkynen became a member of Parliament in 2004 as a replacement when Satu Hassi left her seat upon her election to the European Parliament. He was directly elected to the Parliament in 2007.

Tynkkynen was born in Jyväskylä, Finland. He graduated from the Department of Journalism and Mass Communication at the University of Tampere. From the age of 14 he has been active in environmental and developmental organizations. He is a founding member of Friends of the Earth Finland and has been its vice president in 1996–1997 and in the spring of 2004. Tynkkynen has written articles in many newspapers and has been a reporter for YLE's radio news. His writings often concentrate on equity and the environment, especially climate change.

Tynkkynen was re-elected to Parliament of Finland in 2023 parliamentary election.

== Personal life ==
Tynkkynen was the first openly gay Member of the Parliament of Finland, but has since been joined by others, such as Jani Toivola and Silvia Modig. In his free time he enjoys sports, reading, electronic music and travel.
