= José Arroyo Cabrera =

Ecuadorian politician

- Born: January 12, 1981 (age 45); Pujilí, Ecuador
- Education: Armed Forces University – ESPE
- Occupations: Politician; designer; LGBTQ activist

José Alcides Arroyo Cabrera (born January 12, 1981) is an Ecuadorian designer, politician, and activist. Cabrera has served as the Mayor of Pujilí since May 2023. Cabrera became the first openly LGBT person to be elected Mayor of a city in the history of Ecuador.

== Biography ==
Alcides Arroyo Cabrera was born on January 12, 1981, in the Ecuadorian canton of Pujilí. He did his primary education in the Mixed Fiscal School of Pujilí, and high school in the Province School of Cotopaxi. He studied at the Regional Autonomous University of the Andes, at the Technical University of Ambato, and at the Higher Aeronautical Institute (today University of the Armed Forces of Ecuador), where he obtained the title of Engineer in Design, a bachelor's degree in Tourism Business Administration, and a postgraduate in Political Science and Public Administration.

== Political career ==
=== Candidacy for mayor of Pujilí ===
In 2022, Arroyo was elected candidate by his party the Citizen Revolution Movement to lead the coalition Cantonal Union for Change to occupy the Mayor's Office of Pujilí in the 2023 sectional elections. Among his main campaign proposals were the improvement of the drinking water and sewerage system, the canton's health system, and the construction of community spaces.

On September 18, 2022, he suffered an attack when two men stabbed him with a knife in his arms and abdomen. According to a statement issued by the Cantonal Union for Change, the attack was for political reasons, as he was preparing to make a complaint about alleged acts of corruption in the administration of the then mayor, Luis Ugsha. The inhabitants of Pujilí held a march to demand justice for the case.

During the election campaign, he was the subject of homophobic attacks by Mayor Luis Ugsha, who sought re-election and described LGBT people during a political rally as "a plague" and "a demon against the law of God." These statements were rejected by LGBT rights groups such as Voto LGBT+, in addition to the country's Secretary of Women and the human rights organization Fundamedios.

In the elections on February 5, 2023, Arroyo received 63.7% of the votes, making him mayor-elect of Pujilí; this made him one of the elected mayors with the highest vote and the first openly LGBT mayor in the history of the country. After winning the election, he said in an interview that his victory was a "clear sign that stereotypes and paradigms have been broken" and "giant steps were being taken to achieve rights."

=== Mayor of Pujilí ===
On May 14, 2023, Arroyo was inaugurated as mayor of Pujilí.
