= Armed Forces University – ESPE =

University in Ecuador

Coordinates: 0°18′53.5″S 78°26′36.5″W

- Universidad de las Fuerzas Armadas – ESPE
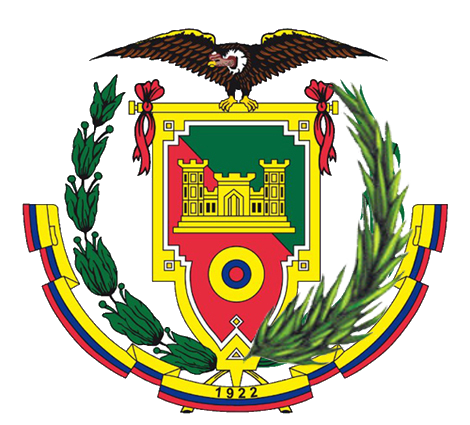
- Official Coat of Arms of the University
- Motto: Innovación para la Excelencia
- Motto in English: Innovation for Excellence
- Type: Public
- Established: 1922; 104 years ago
- Affiliations: Ecuador
- Rector: Lt. Víctor Emilio Villavicencio Álvarez
- Location: Sangolquí, Pichincha, Ecuador
- Website: https://www.espe.edu.ec/ Official website

The Armed Forces University (Spanish: Universidad de las Fuerzas Armadas, ESPE; formerly called Escuela Politécnica del Ejército, Army Polytechnic School) is a higher education university in Sangolquí, Pichincha Province, Ecuador.

Established on June 16, 1922, it originated from the Escuela de Oficiales Ingenieros (School of Engineer Officials), created by the Ecuadorian President José Luis Tamayo.

Currently, ESPE has several campuses across Ecuador. These are ESPE Sangolquí (Main Campus), IASA (El Prado estate), ESPE Latacunga Campus, and ESPE Santo Domingo Zoila Luz Estate.

The main campus boasts numerous labs, courts, auditoriums, virtual classrooms, the Alejandro Segovia Library and the Miguel G. Iturralde Jaramillo Colisseum.

== History ==
Universidad de las Fuerzas Armadas – ESPE was established on June 16 1922, as the Escuela de Oficiales Ingenieros, focusing on the training of army officers in military engineering. In 1936, it became the Escuela de Artillería e Ingenieros with the help of the Second Italian Military Mission, which refocused the institution on technical education, combining artillery science and engineering in the European style. The university was renamed to Escuela Técnica de Ingenieros after World War II and allowed admission to civilian students starting in 1972. In December 1977, the university was renamed Escuela Politécnica del Ejército – ESPE by the Ecuadorian Congress.

On June 26, 2013, the Superior Education Committee of Ecuador approved the construction of a new education center, merging the nation's three extent military higher educational institutions: Escuela Politécnica del Ejército – ESPE, Universidad Naval Rafael Morán Valverde – UNINAV and Instituto Tecnológico Superior Aeronáutico – ITSA. The combined institution was named Universidad de las Fuerzas Armadas – ESPE.

== Organization ==
=== Departments ===
Universidad de las Fuerzas Armadas is divided into Departments.

- Computer Sciences
- Electricity, Electronics and Telecommunications
- Languages
- Life Sciences and Agriculture
- Security and Defense
- Exact Sciences
- Earth and Construction Sciences
- Economic, administrative and Commerce Sciences
- Mechanics and Energy Sciences
- Human and Social Sciences
- Distance Education Unit
