= Angélica Lozano =

Colombian politician (born 1976)

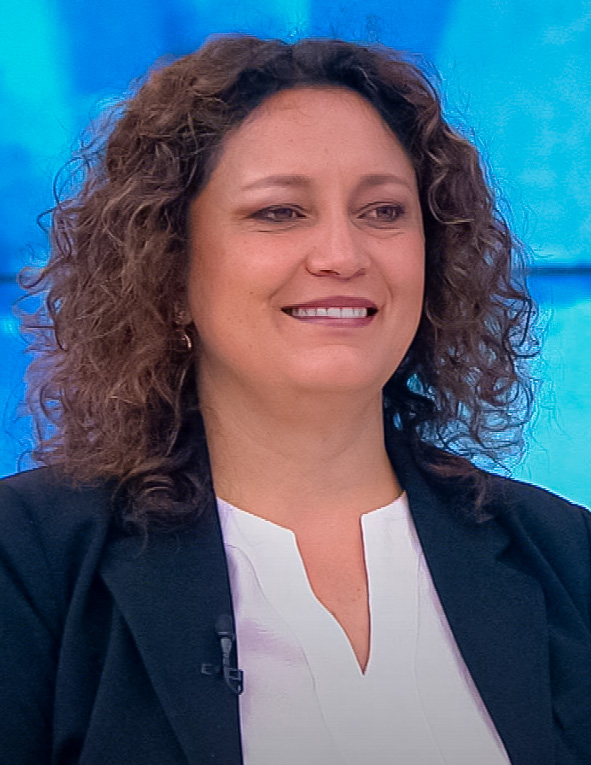
- Lozano, c. 2018.

First Lady of Bogotá
- In role 1 January 2020 – 31 December 2023
- Mayor: Claudia López
- Preceded by: Verónica Alcocer (2015)
- Succeeded by: Carolina Deik

Senator of Colombia
- In office 20 July 2018 – 20 July 2026

Member of the Chamber of Representatives
- In office 20 July 2014 – 20 July 2018
- Constituency: Capital Disctrict

Councillor of Bogotá
- In office 1 January 2012 – 7 December 2013
- Leader: Antonio Sanguino

Mayor of Chapinero
- In office 5 August 2005 – 19 April 2008
- Appointed by: Luis Eduardo Garzón
- Preceded by: José Antonio Pérez
- Succeeded by: Blanca Inés Durán

Personal details
- Born: Angélica Lisbeth Lozano Correa; 7 May 1976 (age 50) Bogotá, D.C., Colombia
- Party: Independent (2011-2013, 2021-present)
- Other political affiliations: Green Alliance (2009-2011, 2013-2021); Progressive Movement (2011-2013); Independent Democratic Pole (2003-2006); Liberal (1994-2002)
- Spouse: Claudia López (m. 2019)
- Education: University of La Sabana (LLB, 2000)
- Profession: Lawyer

Angélica Lisbeth Lozano Correa (born 7 May 1976) is a Colombian politician, activist, and congresswoman who has served as a Senator of Colombia from 2018 to 2026. Lozano previously served as a member of the Chamber of Representatives, Mayor of Chapinero under Mayor Luis Eduardo Garzón, and most recently as First Lady of Bogotá during the mayorship of her wife, Claudia López.

Born in Bogotá, D.C., Lozano is the first openly gay member of the Congress of Colombia. She met Claudia López during her time in the Chamber of Representatives. A law graduate from the University of La Sabana, she was one of the leading advocates for the law that legalized same-sex marriage in 2011.

== Education ==
Lozano received her law degree from the University of La Sabana, located seven miles north of Bogotá in the city of Chía. She also received informal education through the Leadership Program at the National Democratic Institute in 2004. In 2010, Lozano participated in the State Department Fellowship of Local and State level governments.

== Political life ==
Lozano's interest in politics and human rights issues began while she was a law school. During her studies, in 1998, she volunteered with the NGO Opción Colombia in the Puerto Nariño - Amazonas region. She worked as a legal advisor to the mayor and focused on indigenous protection. She then worked as an advisor to two independent Senators that were on the commission for Constitutional measures, Íngrid Betancourt (from 2000 to 2001) and Antonio Navarro Wolff (from 2001 to 2005). In 2003, she co-founded the Independent Democratic Pole party, a left-wing political party. Lozano began her own political career in 2005 when she served as Mayor of the Chapinero district of Bogotá until 2008. Afterwards, in 2011, she was elected to the city council of Bogotá. In 2014 she was elected to the Chamber of Representatives of Colombia as a Green Alliance Party candidate in Bogotá, becoming the country's first out LGBT legislator at the national level.

In 2011, the Colombian Constitutional Court created a ruling that same-sex couples could register their relationship, under the condition that the country's lawmakers do not pursue a bill that would give same-sex couples the same marriage rights as heterosexual couples. Two years after this ruling, the Colombian Senate rejected legislation that would have given the right to marry to same-sex couples. Lozano stated that she will continue to, “fight to secure the recognition of gay/lesbian families.”

In August 2014, Senator Viviane Morales began to collect signatures in support of a referendum that would make adoptions of children by same-sex couples beholden to a popular vote of six unrelated individuals. Lozano spoke out against this push for legislation, stating that “human dignity and fundamental rights are not decided in a referendum.” Her public opposition to this proposal is another example of her fight for LGBT rights in Colombia.

Other than LGBTQ issues, Lozano has supported many other initiatives during her time in office. These issues include: increasing the mobility for bicycle use within the city, political reforms to fight corruption in the government, and she is the current spokeswoman of "las veedurías ciudadanas" or the citizen's watchdogs. One project that she focused on throughout 2015 focused primarily on Enrivonmental Policy. The main aim of this law project was to create environmental loyalties that would be able to monetarily compensate municipalities for their conservation and mechanisms for which these loyalties can be monitored.

== Activism ==
Lozano, who is an out bisexual, is an activist for LGBT rights. After being elected to the House of Representatives in 2014, Lozano stated that her position shows that the, “fight in the name of equality and respect, justice and the recognition of our rights has been achieved.” Also in May 2014, she took part in a training program in Bogotá backed by USAID that lasted for four days, from May 30 to June 2. Many other Colombian LGBTQ activists attended alongside a number of US representatives. This training was part of USAID's LGBTI Global Development Partnership, which aims to create a network of LGBT advocacy groups with local businesses. This initiative will invest 11 million dollars in LGBT advocacy groups in various developing countries. The program is designed to last for the next four years.

== Controversy ==
So far, Lozano's term has not been without controversy. In 2014, Lozano was shown to be in a relationship with a fellow female senator, Claudia López. This relationship sparked a lawsuit from a Colombian senator and Evangelical pastor, Victor Velásquez. He cited Article 179 of the Colombian Constitution which states that two people who are in any form of relationship cannot serve in Congress at the same time. Eventually, the charges were dropped after Lozano and López countered that the stipulation does not apply due to the illegality of marriage equality and civil unions for same-sex couples in Colombia. Lozano and López married in December 2019, following López's election as mayor of Bogotá.

Political offices
Preceded by José Antonio Pérez	Mayor of Chapinero; 2005–2008	Succeeded by Blanca Inés Durán
Honorary titles
Preceded by Verónica Alcocer	First Lady of Bogotá; 2019–2023	Succeeded by Carolina Deik
