= William Dau =

Colombian politician (born 1952)

Mayor of Cartagena
- In office 1 January 2019 – 31 December 2023
- Preceded by: Pedro Pereira
- Succeeded by: Dumek Turbay

Personal details
- Born: William Jorge Dau Chamatt; 16 May 1952 (age 74) Cartagena, Bolivar, Colombia
- Party: Liberal (until 2015)
- Education: Del Rosario University
- Occupation: Politician
- Profession: Lawyer and politician

William Jorge Dau Chamatt (born 16 May 1952) is a Colombian lawyer and politician, since 2019 he has served as Mayor of Cartagena. Later he will move to Bogotá to study law at the Del Rosario University

He is the founder of two NGOs, Corporación Cartagena Honesta (CCH) and most recently Projects for Democracy (PfD).

Party political offices
New political party	Let's save Cartagena nominee for Mayor of Cartagena; 2019	Incumbent
Political offices
Preceded by Pedro Pereira	Mayor of Cartagena; 2019–present	Incumbent
