= Blanca Inés Durán Hernández =

Former mayor of Chapinero, Colombia

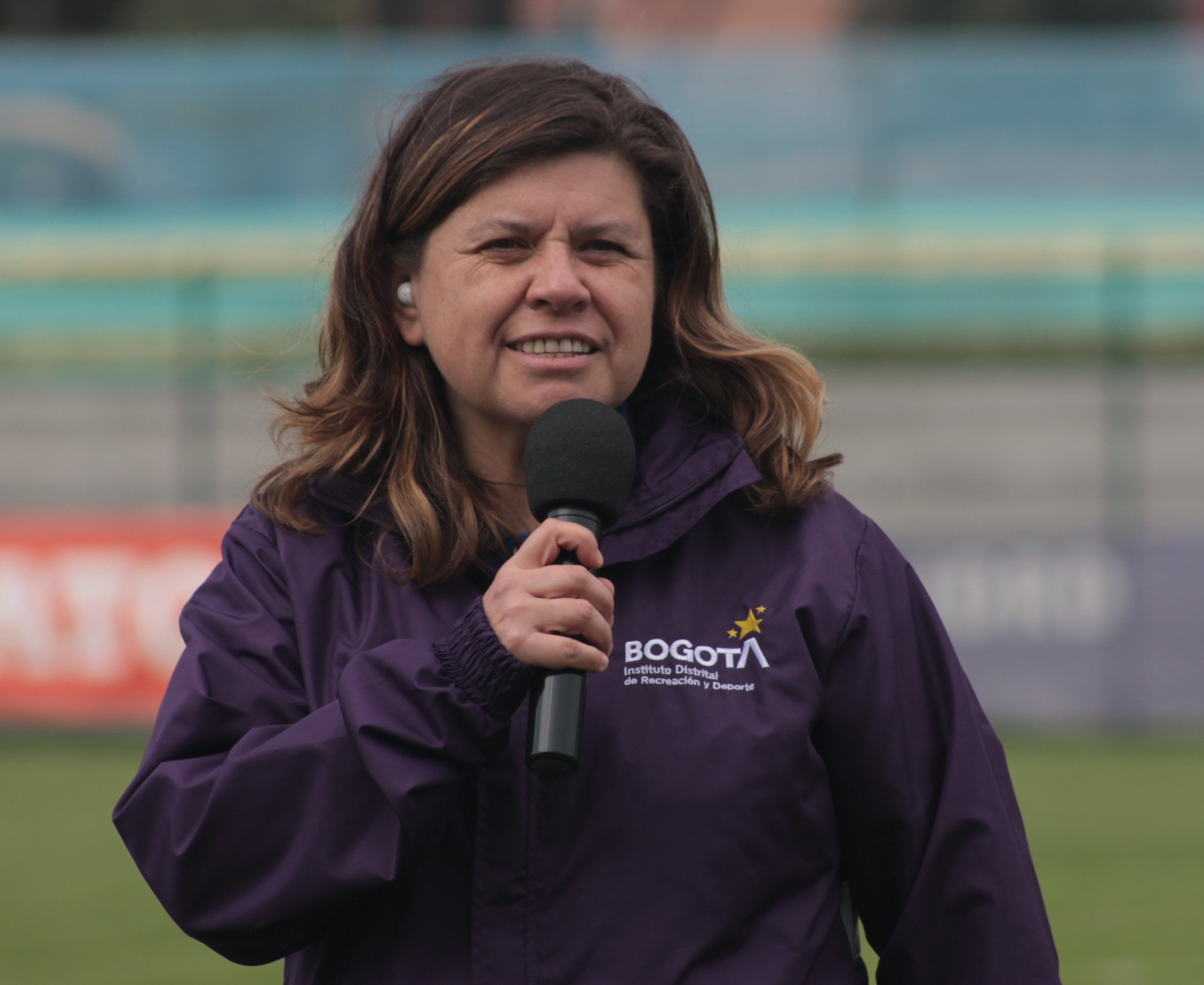

Mayor of Chapinero
- In office 19 April 2008 – 4 April 2012
- Appointed by: Samuel Moreno Rojas
- Preceded by: Angélica Lozano Correa
- Succeeded by: Mauricio Jaramillo Cabrera

Personal details
- Born: 16 June 1971 (age 55) Bogotá, D.C., Colombia
- Party: Partido Alianza Verde Colombia
- Education: University of the Andes (BE, 1995)
- Profession: Industrial Engineer

Blanca Inés Durán Hernández (born 16 June 1971), is a Colombian industrial engineer and former Mayor of Chapinero. She is an openly lesbian politician and activist.
