= Ivan Verbytskyi =

Ukrainian politician (born 1994)

- Іван Вербицький
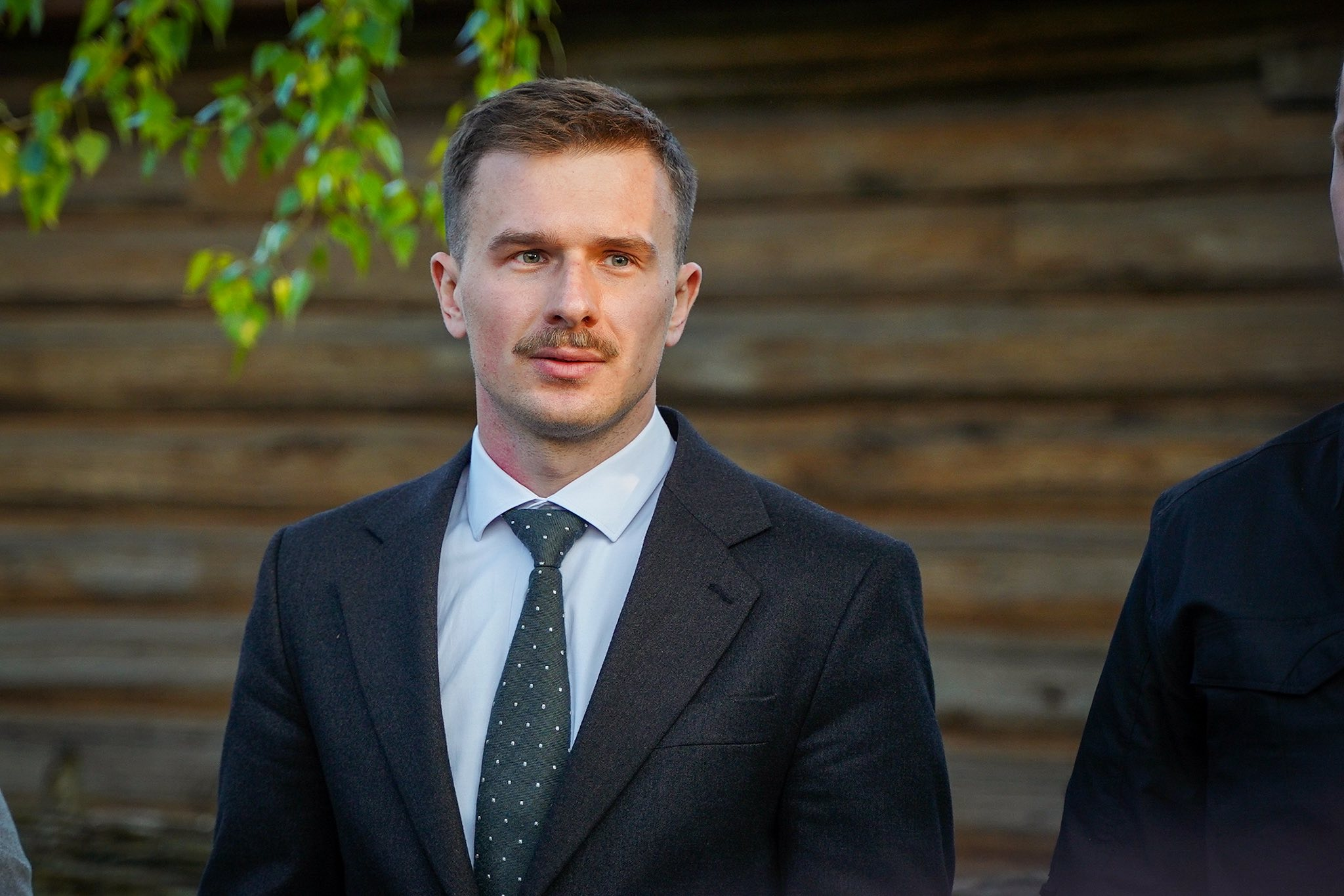
- Verbytskyi in 2026

First Deputy Minister of Culture
- Incumbent
- Assumed office 5 May 2026
- President: Volodymyr Zelenskyy
- Prime Minister: Yulia Svyrydenko; Serhii Koretskyi

Deputy Minister of Culture and Strategic Communications
- In office 25 September 2025 – 5 May 2026
- President: Volodymyr Zelenskyy
- Prime Minister: Yulia Svyrydenko

Personal details
- Born: 7 June 1994 (age 32) Zhovkva, Lviv Oblast, Ukraine

Ivan Ivanovych Verbytskyi (Ukrainian: Іван Іванович Вербицький; born 7 June 1994) is a Ukrainian politician and activist who is currently serving as First Deputy Minister of Culture of Ukraine since 5 May 2026.

== Biography ==
Verbytskyi was born in a religious Orthodox Christian family in Zhovkva, Lviv Oblast. He graduated from the faculty of politology and got a doctorate of sociology at the Kyiv-Mohyla university. After graduation he moved to Kyiv, where he actively participated in LGBTQ+ activism, helping with the organisation of KyivPride. Verbytskyi participated in the Maidan in 2013–2014.

From 2019 to 2024, he was the head of the CEDOS think tank, which won the New European Bauhaus Prize 2024. From 2015 to 2019, he was managing the urban platform Mistosite and the "Ukrainian Urban Forum". Verbytskyi participated in the Council of Europe projects regarding development of the Concept of Integrated Development of the Podilskyi District of Kyiv. In August 2022, he became a co-founder of the "Passazhyry Kyieva" (Passengers of Kyiv) public initiative, their goal being to consolidate the efforts of transport specialists, activists, and passengers in order to improve public transportation in Kyiv.

On 25 September 2025, Verbytskyi was appointed Deputy Minister of Culture and Strategic Communications of Ukraine. He deals with issues of cultural heritage preservation, including the evacuation and return of museum exhibits due to the Russian invasion of Ukraine, and the overall optimization of the process.

On 7 November 2025, as strategic communications were separated from the Ministry of Culture, Verbytskyi's position was changed to Deputy Minister of Culture of Ukraine.

On 5 May 2026, Verbytskyi became the First Deputy Minister of Culture of Ukraine.

== Personal life ==
Verbytskyi publicly came out as gay in a Facebook post in 2019, which makes him the first openly gay government officeholder in Ukraine. Verbytskyi's sexual orientation became the main emphasis of a number of Ukrainian media outlets, including Suspilne, when announcing his appointment as a deputy minister, which caused a wave of criticism. Suspilne later apologized for emphasising Verbytskyi's homosexuality and edited their report about him, as it did not follow their journalistic principles of non-discrimination and neutrality.
