= Saar Netanel =

Israeli activist (born c. 1972)

- סער נתנאל
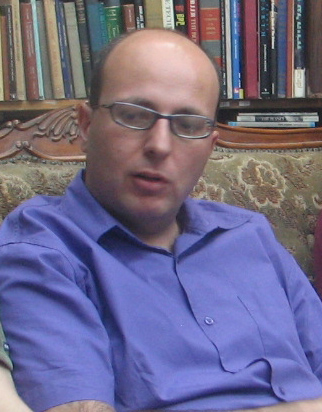

Jerusalem City Council member

Chairman of Jerusalem Meretz Branch

Chair of Hebrew University of Jerusalem's GLBT Student Union, Ha'Asiron Ha'Acher

Personal details
- Born: c.1972
- Party: Meretz

Saar Netanel (Hebrew: סער נתנאל; born c. 1972) was a Jerusalem city council member and was one of the owners of Jerusalem’s only gay pub (The Shushan Pub) at the time it closed in 2007. He was the first openly gay man elected to an Israeli city council. Netanel was chairman of the Jerusalem Meretz branch.

A riot broke out at Wigstock '98 (an annual AIDS fundraiser and drag festival) and four were arrested. Netanel, who was chair of the Hebrew University of Jerusalem’s LGBT student union, Ha'Asiron Ha'Acher, was one of the people arrested.

== Publications ==
- Why the Eurovision belongs in Tel Aviv
