= Silvia Modig =

Finnish journalist and politician (born 1976)

Silvia Modig MEP
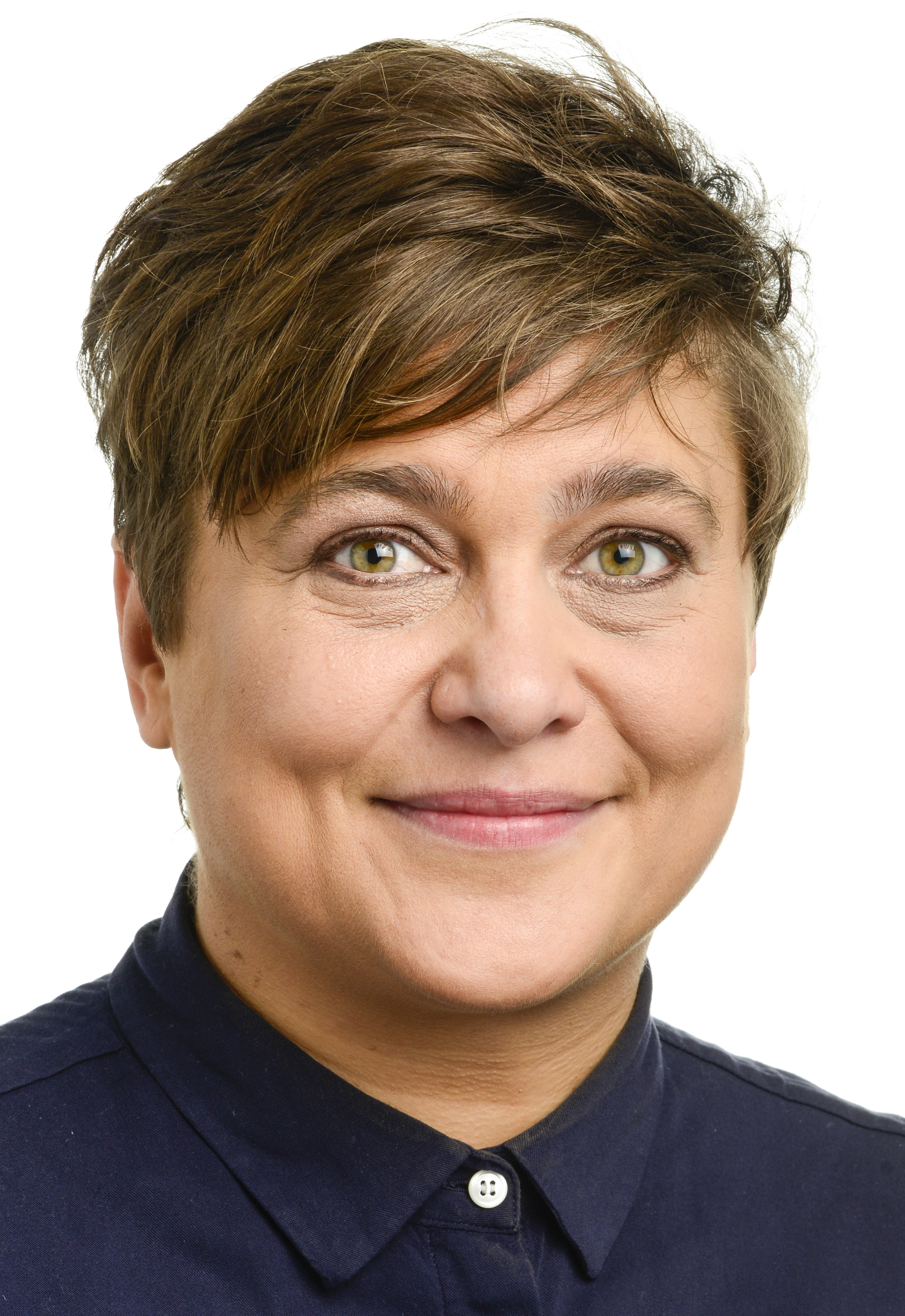

Member of the European Parliament
- In office 2019 – 15 July 2024
- Constituency: Finland

Member of the Finnish Parliament
- In office 20 April 2011 – 16 April 2019
- Constituency: Helsinki

Personal details
- Born: 8 July 1976 (age 50) Helsinki, Finland
- Party: Finnish: Left Alliance; EU: GUE-NGL
- Spouse: Meri Valkama (2019–2023)
- Website: www.silviamodig.fi

Anna Silvia Modig (born 8 July 1976) is a Finnish politician; and a former journalist, and radio and TV host. She was a member of the Parliament of Finland 2011–2019, representing the Left Alliance, and was elected to the European Parliament in 2019. Modig is also a member of the Helsinki City Council.

== Career ==
Modig belongs to the Swedish-speaking minority of Finland. She was raised in the eastern suburbs of Helsinki. Modig started her television career at the age of 18 working for the Yle Children and Youth. Her latest TV show was YLE Teema's talk show Popkult.

Modig was elected to the Helsinki City Council by 895 votes in the 2008 municipal elections as an independent candidate on the Left Alliance list. Modig was elected to the parliament in the 2011 elections, and re-elected in the 2015 elections. She was left out of the parliament in the 2019 elections, but was elected to the European Parliament in the 2019 European Parliament election with 51,608 votes nationwide as the only representative of the Left Alliance.

== Personal life ==
Modig is openly lesbian and is a vegetarian. She was in a registered partnership with a Finnish artist and writer Rakel Liekki, but they broke up in October 2011. In June 2019, she married her partner Meri Valkama, who is the Communications Manager and Group Secretary of the Left Alliance Helsinki District. In 2023, Modig competed on Amazing Race Suomi with Aino-Kaisa Pekonen. The two were eliminated in the second episode in Phuket.
