= Claudia López =

Colombian politician (born 1970)

Her Grace Claudia López
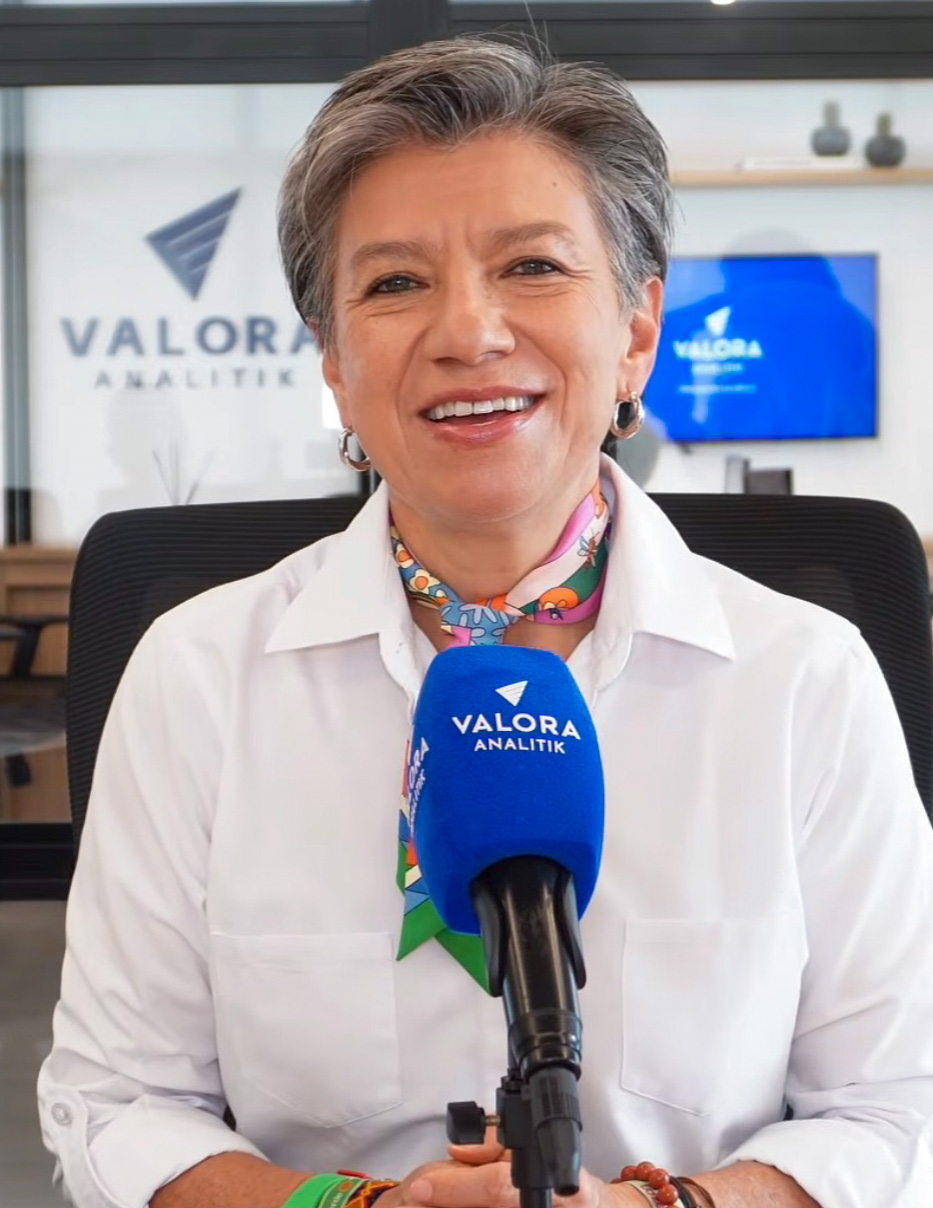
- López in 2016

799th Mayor of Bogotá
- In office 1 January 2020 – 31 December 2023
- Preceded by: Enrique Peñalosa
- Succeeded by: Carlos Fernando Galán

Senator of Colombia
- In office 20 July 2014 – 20 July 2018

Personal details
- Born: Claudia Nayibe López Hernández; 9 March 1970 (age 56) Bogotá, Colombia
- Party: Green Alliance
- Spouse: Angélica Lozano (m. 2019)
- Education: Universidad Externado, Columbia University, Northwestern University
- Occupation: Senator, political scientist
- Website: www.claudia-lopez.com

Claudia Nayibe López Hernández (born 9 March 1970) is a Colombian politician. She was a Senator of the Republic of Colombia and was the vice-presidential candidate in the 2018 presidential election for the Green Alliance party. In October 2019, she was elected mayor of Bogotá, the first woman and as well the first openly LGBT person to be elected to this position.

== Biography ==
Claudia Nayibe López Hernández, the daughter of Elías López Reyes and María del Carmen Hernández Ruiz, is the oldest of six siblings.

=== Education ===
She graduated in finance, Government, and International Relations from the Universidad Externado de Colombia. She has a master's degree in Public Administration and Urban Politics from Columbia University in New York, and a Ph.D. in political science from Northwestern University in Evanston, Illinois.

=== Career ===
López's appearance in public life is linked to the student movement of the Seventh Ballot, which between 1989 and 1990 was what gave impulse to the 1991 Constituent Assembly of Colombia.

She has been a consultant to the United Nations and has written for several media outlets in the country such as the Caracol Radio program Hora 20, the portal La Silla Vacía, the newspaper El Tiempo, and the magazine Semana.

As a researcher for the Arcoiris Corporation and the Electoral Observation Mission (Misión de Observación Electoral; MOE), López was recognized for her work on the atypical polls which were the starting point for uncovering the parapolitics scandal. Her critical views on the government of ex-president Álvaro Uribe and his political allies were equally contentious. Controversy was stirred by her public firing from El Tiempo in October 2009 due to an opinion column she published there which criticized the paper's coverage of certain news.

López was the Secretary of Social Action of Bogotá during the first mayoral term of Enrique Peñalosa. She is also a member of the Washington, D.C.–based think tank, the Inter-American Dialogue.

=== Senator of the Republic ===
In 2014, Claudia López was elected to the Senate with 81,125 votes as a candidate for the Green Alliance party.

=== Presidential candidacy ===
On 27 December 2016, Senator López formally announced her intention to become president of Colombia in the 2018 elections, thus becoming the first pre-candidate of the Green Alliance party. Later, Antonio Navarro Wolff announced that he would also be presented as a pre-candidate. On 14 September 2017, the national congress of the Green Alliance was held to announce the results of a nationwide poll to elect the party's presidential candidate, with Claudia López winning.

=== Mayor of Bogota ===
On 27 October 2019, López was elected mayor of Bogota after leading a strong campaign against corruption. She was then sworn in on 1 January 2020 and became the city's first openly gay Mayor and the first woman elected for that position in Bogota. (Three women had previously held the position of Mayor of Bogotá, but they were all Acting Mayors who were filling in for elected mayors.)

== Awards ==
She was on the list of the BBC's 100 Women announced on 23 November 2020.

== Controversies ==
=== Investigations into parapolitics ===
López began to gain notoriety after publishing a series of reports on anomalies in regional election processes on the Semana magazine website. These reports were part of a sequence of events that led to the uncovering of the parapolitics scandal in 2006. Her arguments and opinion columns were controversial and led to judicial problems, as in the case of the complaint filed against her by Antioquia governor Luis Alfredo Ramos for a column which pointed out that he obtained votes with the help of paramilitary groups. "Ramos could have been elected without the support of the paramilitaries and chose not to do so," she said. The journalist's allegations led to his arrest. Later the Supreme Court gave him his freedom due to a lack of evidence and for being the victim of an alleged network of false witnesses.

=== El Tiempo dismissal controversy ===
In an October 2009 incident which caused controversy and debate on freedom of expression and of the press in Colombia, López was publicly dismissed from the newspaper El Tiempo after her regular Tuesday column in which she criticized how the paper had covered information related to the Agro Ingreso Seguro scandal. According to López, members of the Santos family who were former owners and now shareholders of the newspaper tried to favor the candidacy of former minister and president Juan Manuel Santos. López also referred to the paper's interest in acquiring the country's so-called third private television channel. El Tiempo published the column, with a note appended that López's opinion was being interpreted as a letter of resignation, which was accepted immediately. At the same time it described the columnist's assertions as "false, malicious, and defamatory."

=== Denunciation of ex-president Samper ===
In 2011 a criminal proceeding was resolved in López's favor, after ex-president Ernesto Samper denounced her for insult and defamation for linking him to the Mafia in a column in El Tiempo.

== Writings ==
Claudia López stood out as a columnist for Semana, El Tiempo, and La Silla Vacía. Her investigations into parapolitics were published in the books Parapolítica: la ruta de la expansión paramilitar y los acuerdos políticos and Y refundaron la patria: de cómo mafiosos y políticos reconfiguraron el Estado colombiano. In mid-2016 she presented her vision on how to end the armed conflict with the FARC in her book ¡Adiós A Las Farc! ¿Y ahora qué?.

== Personal life ==
On 2 September 2014, an attorney sued Senator López for having a relationship with Representative Angélica Lozano Correa, because the law prohibits two Congress members who have a de facto marital union from being members of the same political party. However, López and Lozano have argued that this prohibition does not apply to them since they maintain an engagement and not a marital union. López and Lozano married in December 2019.

Political offices
Preceded by Enrique Peñalosa	Mayor of Bogotá; 2020–2023	Succeeded by Carlos Fernando Galán
