= Sofía Petro =

Colombian activist and feminist (born 2002)

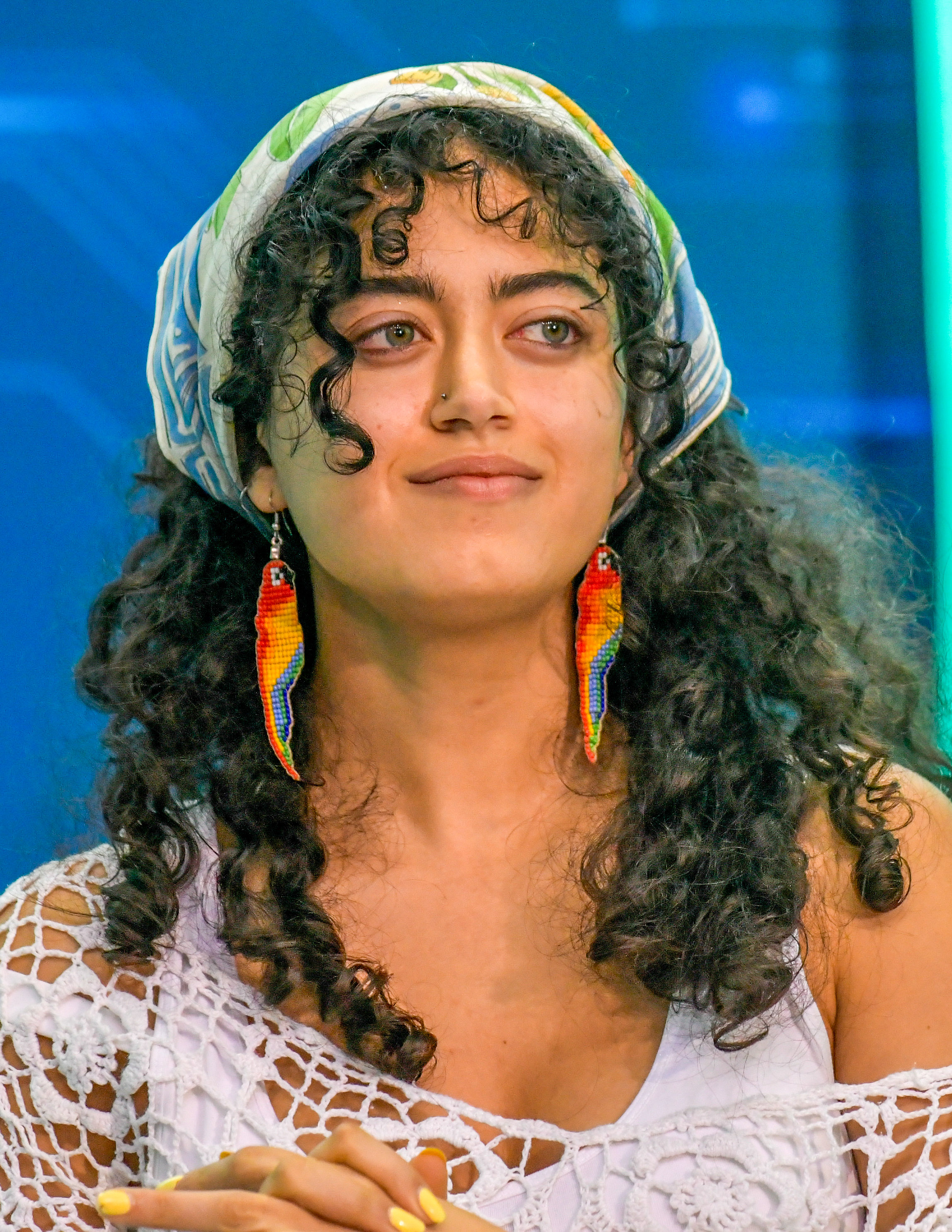
- Petro in December 2024.
- Born: Sofía Petro Alcocer; November 28, 2002 (age 23); Bogotá, D.C., Colombia
- Occupations: Activist; feminist; environmentalist; student
- Years active: 2018–present
- Political party: Humane Colombia
- Parents: Gustavo Petro (father); Verónica Alcocer (mother)
- Family: Petro family

Sofía Petro Alcocer (born November 28, 2002) is a Colombian artist, feminist, and environmental activist. Known for her opinions on the environment and the role of women in society, she has participated in various environmental forums. Petro's parents are President Gustavo Petro and First Lady Verónica Alcocer.

== Early life, family and education ==
Sofía Petro Alcocer was born on November 28, 2002, in Bogotá, D.C., to philanthropist Verónica Alcocer and Senator Gustavo Petro. She is the half-sister of Nicolás Petro, Andrés Petro, and Andrea Petro, children from Gustavo Petro's first marriage, as well as Nicolás Alcocer, the eldest son of her mother, Verónica Alcocer. Petro's great-grandfather migrated from Verona, Italy, to Ciénaga de Oro, Córdoba. She is of Italian descent on both her mother's and father's sides; her great-great-grandfather was from northern Italy.

Petro was raised Catholic and baptized in the St. Francis of Assisi Cathedral in Sincelejo, Sucre. During her childhood, her father was a senator for Bogotá, Colombia. Petro attended the Lycée français Louis Pasteur in Bogotá, as did her siblings Nicolás and Antonella, where she learned French and English. Petro is a philosophy student at the University of Sao Paulo.

=== Activism ===
Petro has been known for her advocacy of feminism and LGBTQ+ rights. In December 2024, she publicly criticized her father's appointments of men involved in scandals involving the mistreatment of women, most notably the designated Minister Armando Benedetti. In November 2025, she accompanied her father to the 2025 United Nations Climate Change Conference in Belém, Brazil.

=== Role in father's campaign ===
In June 2022, Petro gave an interview to Semana magazine, where she reflected on why her father was the ideal presidential candidate, whom she described as "coherent and transparent". Petro, who stood out for her articulate style, was considered a key figure among young voters during the 2022 Colombian presidential election.
