= Family of Gustavo Petro =

Colombian first family from 2022 to 2026

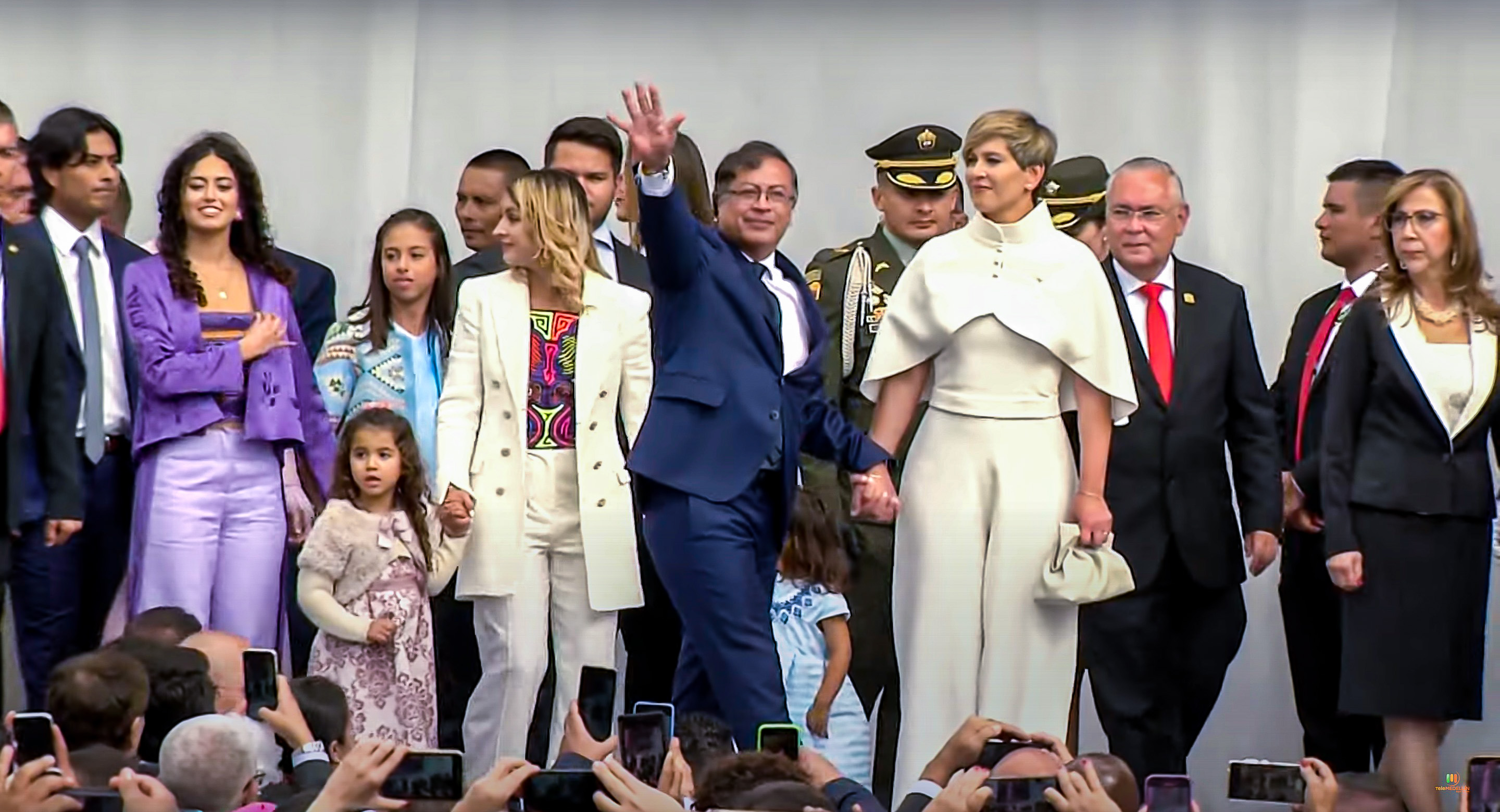
- From left to right: Gustavo, Verónica, Nicolás, Andrea, Nicolás Alcocer, and Sofía, Antonella.
- Current region: Verona, Italy / Bogotá, D.C., Colombia
- Titles: List: President of Colombia; First Lady of Colombia; Senator of Colombia; Superior Mayor of Bogotá; First Lady of Bogotá; Member of the Chamber of Representatives of Colombia; Member of the Departamental Assembly of Atlántico
- Members: Gustavo Petro; Verónica Alcocer; Nicolás Petro; Andrea Petro; Andrés Petro; Nicolás Alcocer; Sofía Petro; Antonella Petro
- Connected members: Katia Burgos; Luz Mary Herrán; Gustavo Petro, Sr. Clara Nubia Urrego; Juan Fernando Petro

Gustavo Petro, the 35th president of Colombia, has family members who are prominent in education, activism and politics. Petro's immediate family became the first family of Colombia on his inauguration on August 7, 2022. His immediate family circle was also the first family of Bogotá from 2012 to 2016, when Petro was mayor of Bogotá. Petro's family descends primarily from the city of Verona, and most of his ancestors come from Spain and Southern Italy.

== Wives ==
=== Katia Burgos ===
Katia Burgos is the first wife of Gustavo Petro, they met in Cienaga de Oro, Córdoba, they married in 1985 and a year later, in 1986, Nicolás was born, so Burgos, she moved to Cajicá, Cundinamarca where her mother-in-law Clara Nubia Urrego lived.

=== Mary Luz Herrán ===
Mary Luz Herrán entered the 19th of April Movement with Gustavo Petro in 1988, with whom she would later have Andrea in 1991 and Andrés in 1992. Herrán would be in jail for 13 months for the use of false identities, being the first woman from this movement to get out of jail.

=== Verónica Alcocer ===
Verónica del Socorro Alcocer García is the third and current wife of Gustavo Petro, she was born on May 26, 1976, in Sincelejo, Sucre.

He and she got married on December 7, 2000, Sofia and Antonella were born. Later in 2023, Gustavo would officially adopt his stepson Nicolás, Verónica's son.

== Children ==
Petro has six children from three marriages: Nicolás with Katia Burgos; Andrés and Andrea with Luz Mary Herrán; Sofía, Antonella and Nicolás Alcocer with Verónica Alcocer.

=== Nicolás Petro ===
Nicolás Fernando Petro Burgos was born on June 21, 1986, in Cienaga de Oro, Córdoba where he grew up with his mother while his father belonged to the 19th of April Movement. Petro studied Law at the Universidad Pontificia Bolivariana and would later study a master's degree in Government and Public Management for Latin America at the Pompeu Fabra University in Barcelona, Spain. In 2019 he would participate as a candidate for Governor of Atlántico during the 2019 Colombian regional and municipal elections where he achieved second place, automatically becoming a Member of the Departmental Assembly of Atlántico.

=== Andrea Petro ===
Andrea Petro Herrán, born in Bogotá, D.C., on March 29, 1991. She is a Colombian entrepreneur, economist, and emerging public figure, recognized for her contributions to sustainable business and her growing presence in Colombian political and social circles. She is the eldest daughter of Gustavo Petro, President of Colombia, and Luz Mary Herrán. She studied Applied Economics at Aix-Marseille III University in France and holds a master’s degree in Management in International Trade.

She has two daughters, Luna and Victoria. Petro spent part of her childhood in Belgium and is fluent in French and English.[4] She is the founder and CEO of the activewear brand Bachué Sportswear.

She resides primarily in France.

=== Andrés Petro ===
Andrés Gustavo Petro Herrán, born July 18, 1992 in Bogotá, D.C., is Petro's second child with Mary Luz Herrán. He is a psychologist by profession. In 2021, he received political asylum in Canada, after death threats and a failed murder attempt. In March 2024 he would make public his engagement to his girlfriend Maira. The couple officially married on March 3, 2025.

=== Sofía Petro ===
Sofía Petro Alcocer was born on November 28, 2002 in Bogotá, D.C., is Petro's fourth daughter and his first daughter with Verónica Alcocer. She is studying philosophy at the University of São Paulo in São Paulo, Brazil.

=== Antonella Petro ===
Antonella Petro Alcocer was born on July 7, 2008 in Bogotá, D.C., is the youngest daughter of Gustavo Petro and Verónica Alcocer. She is currently attending the Lycée Français Louis Pasteur of Bogotá, D.C. In August 2024, she made the decision to study abroad due to the constant harassment she had received due to the political positions of the Petro administration. Days later, she decided to stay in Colombia.

=== Nicolás Alcocer ===
Nicolás Alcocer Petro (Note: Although his paternal surname is Petro and his maternal family name is Alcocer, he reversed the order of his surnames.) was born in Bogotá, D.C. In 1998 he was the eldest son of Verónica Alcocer, who gave birth to him at the age of 21. Nicolás was raised from his first year by Gustavo Petro as his father. He studied at the Lycée Français Louis Pasteur of Bogotá, D.C., like his half-siblings. Between 2017 and 2019 he studied at the Externado University of Colombia and later in 2020 he moved to Toulouse, France to study administration at the Toulouse Capitole University and business development at Toulouse Business School. In 2024 he was legally adopted by Gustavo Petro.

== Ancestry ==
- Gustavo Petro Sr., married Clara Nubia Urrego
  - Gustavo Petro economist, 35th President of Colombia, married/divorced Katia Burgos; married/divorced Mary Luz Herrán; married Verónica Alcocer
    - Nicolás Petro (born 1986; of first marriage)
    - Andrea Petro (born 1991; of second marriage)
    - Andrés Petro (born 1992; of second marriage)
    - Sofía Petro (born 2002; of third marriage)
    - Antonella Petro (born 2008; of third marriage)

== See also ==
- Holguín family
- Santos family
