= Martín von Hildebrand =

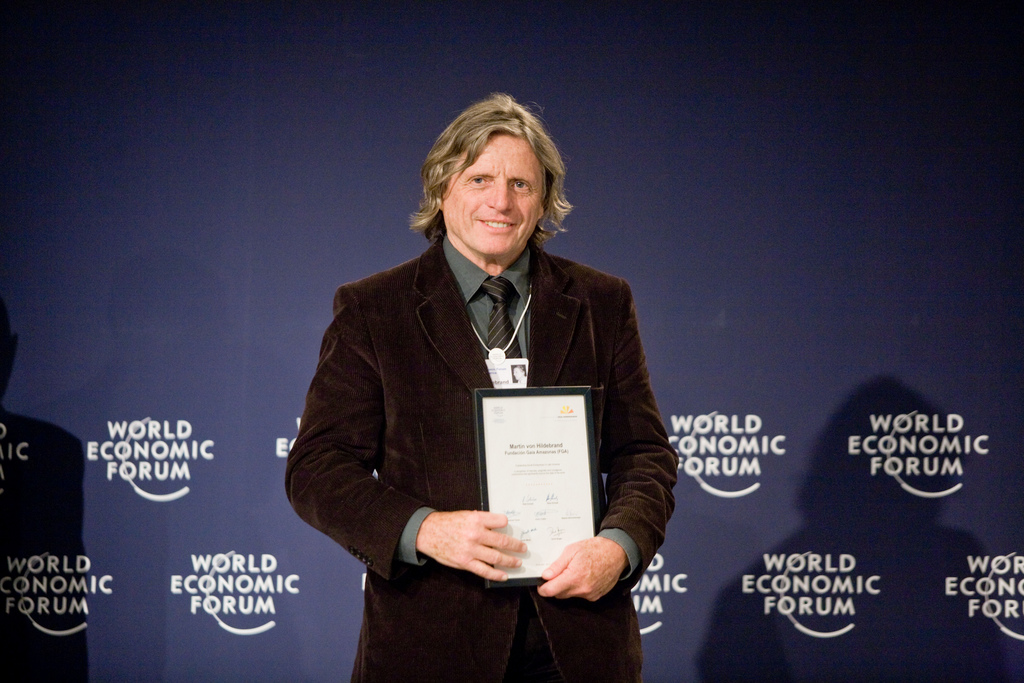
Martín von Hildebrand (Rio de Janeiro, 2009)

Dr. Martín von Hildebrand is an ethnologist and anthropologist who has led efforts to secure indigenous territorial rights and the protection of the Colombian Amazon tropical forest. He has been awarded the Right Livelihood Award, the Skoll Award for Social Entrepreneurship and The Order of the Golden Ark in recognition of his work with Fundacion Gaia Amazonas and the COAMA program.

Known as an activist for indigenous rights, cultural and ecological diversity, his work in both government and non-government sectors have led to more than 26 million hectares of the Colombian Amazon territory being officially handed back to the local indigenous inhabitants enabling indigenous organisations to manage their own education, health and other programs through local governance and state policy decentralisation. Hildebrand established in 1990 the COAMA program, winner of the Right Livelihood Award, and is founding Director of the NGO Fundación Gaia Amazonas, ranked #40 among the top 100 NGOs of the world by the Global Journal.

Dr. Martin von Hildebrand is currently the secretary general for the Amazon Cooperation Treaty Organization ACTO OTCA.

== Personal Background ==
Martín von Hildebrand, a nationalized Colombian, was born in New York City on 26 January 1943. He moved to Colombia in 1948 when his parents, Franz von Hildebrand (grandson of philosopher Dietrich von Hildebrand great-grandson of artist and sculptor Adolf von Hildebrand and great-great-grandson of economist Bruno Hildebrand ), Dierdre Mulcahy were invited to Bogotá to establish the University de los Andes. He spent his childhood living with his family in the building that is today the university's Law Faculty.

Hildebrand studied at the Lycée Français, Bogotá, and later studied sociology at University College Dublin from where he graduated in 1968. In 1979 he studied at the Sorbonne in Paris for a Doctorate in Ethnology. He has three sons Antonio, Francisco, Gregorio and 7 grandchildren.

== Territorial rights and local governance in the Colombian Amazon ==
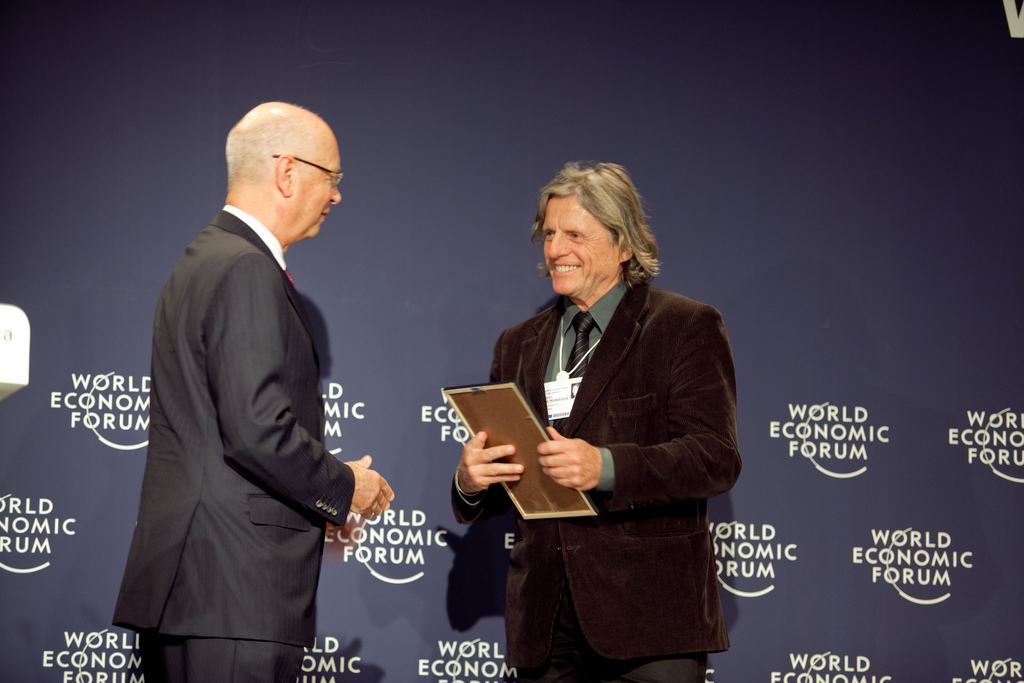
Klaus Schwab and Martín von Hildebrand (Rio de Janeiro, 2009)

Learning from the indigenous communities

An intense involvement with environmental and indigenous issues began in the early 1970s after a period living among Tanimuka and Letuama indigenous communities in the Colombian Amazon, learning about their cosmology and traditional practices for safeguarding the environment.

For the indigenous peoples of the Colombian Amazon, the forest is their habitat and means of survival, with both aesthetic and spiritual importance. Their traditional knowledge, acquired over centuries of interaction with their surrounding environment, leads the communities to protect and sustain the forest ecosystem. Since the 1950s, however, the Colombian Amazon and its indigenous peoples have suffered from waves of colonization and exploitation: peasant refugees during the time of 'La Violencia'; colonists following in the wake of petroleum exploration; economic booms for rubber extraction, gold mining and the illicit processing of coca; government and aid-agency sponsored resettlement and development programs. Aside from the environmental devastation, the indigenous people have suffered a loss of traditional rights to their territory and sustainable livelihood options.

In 1972, Hildebrand set up the Amazon branch of the Colombian Anthropological Institute, in La Pedrera, through which he was able to bring together a multi-disciplinary team of specialists (biologists, lawyers, anthropologists, doctors and educationists). The most essential principle in this process was that local indigenous communities were given a real opportunity to choose their own path of 'development'. They had access to the information they needed and the freedom to assess their situation according to their own cultural view.

It was within this context that Hildebrand insisted that the single most important mission that he would commit himself, obviously with the backing of the Indians, was the establishment of land rights over their traditional territory. Without this their future, their traditions and the forest itself faced destruction. Single-mindedly Hildebrand pursued this goal at every opportunity.

Developing Colombia's Amazon Policy

After a brief departure from Colombia in 1979, to complete a Doctorate in Ethnology at the Sorbonne, Hildebrand returned to work with the Ministry of Education and establish government policy on ethno-education.

In 1986, he became Head of Indigenous Affairs and advisor to President Virgilio Barco Vargas (1986–1990). This provided an important foothold for encouraging government policy favorable to indigenous rights. The backing of President Barco gave an important impetus for the new Political Constitution and ratification of International Labour Organization Convention No. 169, an essential framework for securing indigenous rights in Colombia.

Between 1986 and 1990 the Colombian Government legally recognised 200,000 square kilometres of rainforest in the Colombian Amazon region as 'collective indigenous territory' – resguardos (1). This policy was an unprecedented move towards the recognition of indigenous rights and the important role of forest peoples in the conservation of the world's tropical rainforests.

As Government representative in the Amazon Pact, Hildebrand also pushed for the creation of a Special Commission on Indian Affairs and another on the Environment, giving an ecological stance to the implementation of the Pact.

COAMA program

In 1990, Hildebrand decided to leave government to become more directly involved in grassroots work in the Amazon. The recognition of indigenous territorial rights was, in the words of Hildebrand, just the beginning of the process. What followed was the need for work to ensure that the Indians had the necessary backing to administer their territories according to their traditions.

Hildebrand launched the COAMA program, involving a small network of NGOs and indigenous organizations, and founded Fundación Gaia Amazonas, a non-government organization. COAMA has provided an innovative approach towards working with indigenous communities and developing self-governance as the basis for tropical forest preservation. It has been commended by the World Commission on Forest and Sustainable Development, and funded by mainly by the European Commission and the governments of Denmark, the Netherlands and Sweden.

Hildebrand also started a trans-boundary initiative, CANOA, with indigenous organizations and NGOs that are active in northwest Amazon region, to protect nearly 700.000km2 of continuous and well-preserved tropical forest across a region by Colombia, Brazil and Venezuela.

== Awards ==
- • Right Livelihood Award - Sweden, 1999
- • National Environmental Prize - Colombia, 1999
- • Official of the Order of the Golden Ark – The Netherlands, 2004
- • Simón Rodríguez Prize for Ecology – Colombia, 2004
- • Operation Hope's Man of the Year - U.S.A, 2006
- • Skoll Awards for Social Entrepreneurship - Oxford, 2009
- • Latin American Social Entrepreneur. World Economic Forum - Brasil, 2009
- • Colombia's Top 10 Best Leaders - Colombia, 2013
- • Tällberg Foundation Global Leadership Prize - Sweden, 2015.
- • Presidential Distinguished Service Award for the Irish Abroad- Ireland, 2016.

== Quotes ==
- "This experiment is so outrageous that we have to support it. It is absolutely pertinent to the present ecological crisis." – European Community official, commenting on the COAMA program in 1991.
- ".. one of the most compelling examples in the world today of the contribution to a sustainable future that can be made by indigenous peoples." – Statement from the Right Livelihood Award, 1999.
- "A ray of light [and] our contribution to the creation of a world of co-operation and solidarity and our fight to save humanity from the ravages of civilisation." - former President of Colombia, Alfonso Lopez, commenting on the COAMA program, 2001.

== Selected works ==
- Teachings of the Ash people of the Amazon forest. En Path to Nature's Wisdom ecological dialogue Himalaya & Alps. Leibnitz, Austria: Naturschutzbund Steiermark. 2004: 221–231.
- An Amazonian Tribe's View of Cosmology. In: Gaia, the Thesis, the Mechanism and the Implications. Peter Bunyard and Edward Goldsmith (Eds.). pp. 206–236. Wadebridge Ecological Centre, Wadebridge, Cornwall, 1988.
- "Man and Nature: An Indian Interpretation of the Amazonian Ecosystems". In: Man and Nature in the Amazons, ed. Gerd Kohlhepp, Ackim Schrader, Tübingen, Blauberen, 1986.
- Education and Research. In: Indian Communities, Science & Technology Magazine, Vo1.3, No.4, Colciencias, Bogotá, 1984.
- The Ufaina DweUing as a Calendar and Sun Clock. In: PROA Magazine, Issue 323, 1983.
- The Indians' Problem is White. In: EFETECE, Bogotá, 1983.
- Archaeology and Ethnology of the Sierra Nevada de Santa Marta. Report for UNEP, Programme of eco-development for the Sierra Nevada de Santa Marta, Co-authors: A. Andrade, Y. Campos, INDERENA, Bogotá, 1982.

== Notes ==
1. Resguardo is a legal figure in Colombia that enables collective ownership over traditional territories by their local inhabitants. They cannot be sold or embargoed. They have a similar status to that of municipalities, and indigenous inhabitants assume the right to receive a share of state funds each year for housing, drinking water and other social projects.
