= Amazon Cooperation Treaty Organization =

International environmental sustainability organization

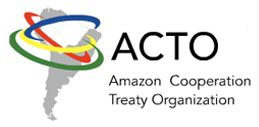

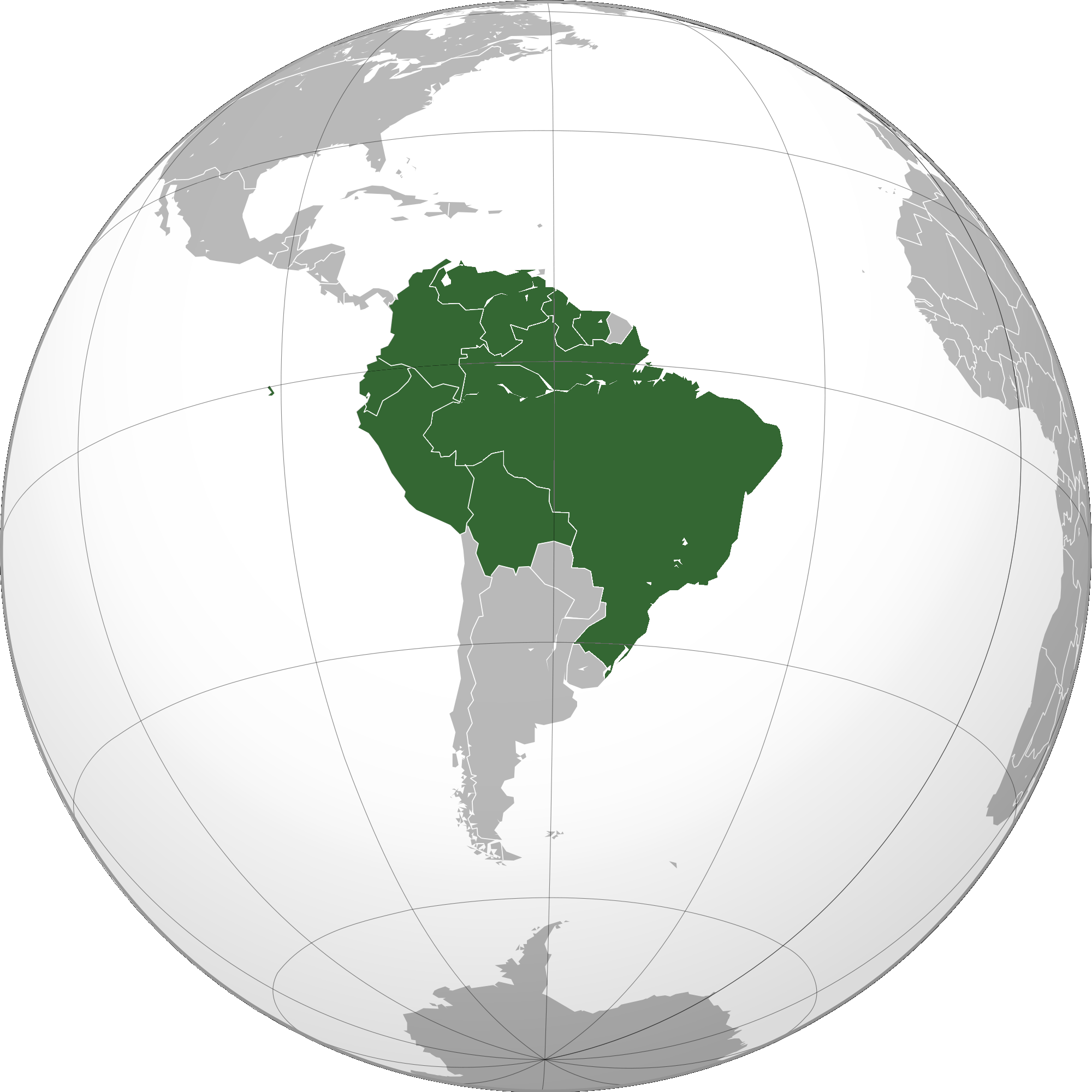
- Member states of ACTO
- Abbreviation: ACTO
- Established: 25 February 1995
- Headquarters: Brasília, Brazil
- Coordinates: 15.847357°S 47.895831°W
- Members: 8 states: Bolivia; Brazil; Colombia; Ecuador; Guyana; Peru; Suriname; Venezuela
- Official languages: Dutch; English; Portuguese; Spanish
- Secretary-General: Martin von Hildebrand
- Website: otca.org

The Amazon Cooperation Treaty Organization (ACTO) (Portuguese: Organização do Tratado de Cooperação Amazônica (OTCA)) is an international organization aimed at the promotion of sustainable development of the Amazon Basin. Its member states are: Bolivia, Brazil, Colombia, Ecuador, Guyana, Peru, Suriname and Venezuela.

The Amazon Cooperation Treaty (ACT) was signed on 3 July 1978 and amended in 1998. ACTO was created in 1995 to strengthen the implementation of the Treaty. The Permanent Secretariat was later established in Brasília in 2002.

== Members ==
A clickable Euler diagram showing the relationships between various multinational organizations in the Americas

- Bolivia
- Brazil
- Colombia
- Ecuador
- Guyana
- Peru
- Suriname
- Venezuela

=== Observers ===
- France
- DR Congo
- Congo
- Indonesia

== 2023 ACTO Summit ==
In January 2023, Brazil announced it was hosting the 2023 Amazon Cooperation Treaty Organization Summit in August in the same year. The Democratic Republic of the Congo, the Republic of the Congo, and Indonesia were invited to attend in order to represent the Congo and Borneo and Sumatra rainforests respectively. Brazil also invited France to attend and join the organization, as France holds territory in the Amazon through its department of French Guiana.
