= Gustavo Petro =

President of Colombia from 2022 to 2026

Gustavo Petro ODB ODSC OYC
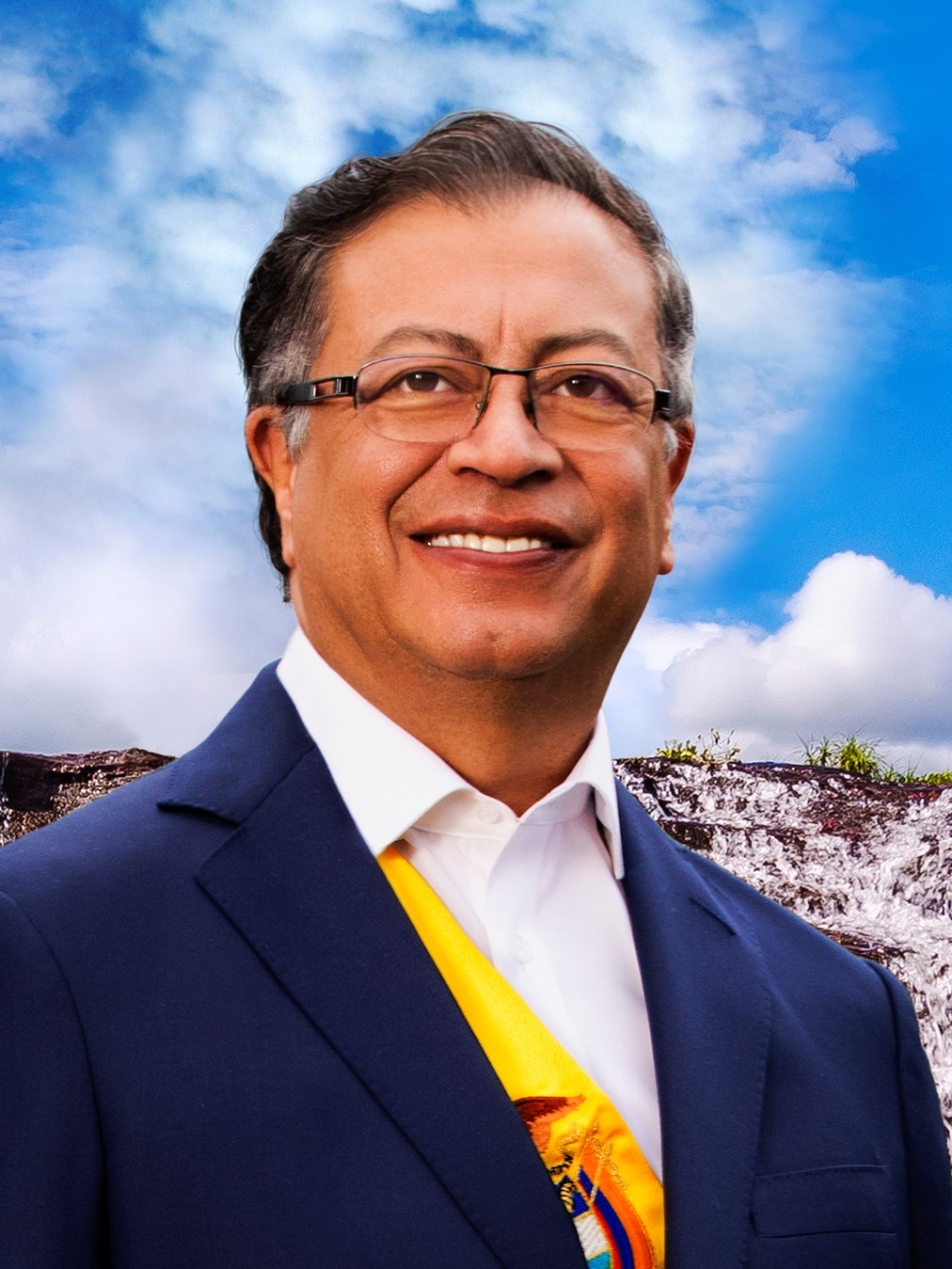
- Official portrait, 2022

35th President of Colombia
- In office 7 August 2022 – 7 August 2026
- Vice President: Francia Márquez
- Preceded by: Iván Duque
- Succeeded by: Abelardo de la Espriella

President pro tempore of the Community of Latin American and Caribbean States
- In office 9 April 2025 – 21 March 2026
- Preceded by: Xiomara Castro
- Succeeded by: Yamandú Orsi

Senator of Colombia
- In office 20 July 2018 (Note: Declared elected as the runner-up in the 2018 presidential election.) – 20 July 2022
- In office 20 July 2006 – 20 July 2010

Mayor of Bogotá
- In office 23 April 2014 – 31 December 2015
- Preceded by: María Mercedes Maldonado
- Succeeded by: Enrique Peñalosa
- In office 1 January 2012 – 19 March 2014
- Preceded by: Clara López
- Succeeded by: Rafael Pardo

Member of the Chamber of Representatives
- In office 20 July 1998 – 20 July 2006
- Constituency: Capital District
- In office 1 December 1991 – 20 July 1994
- Constituency: Cundinamarca

Personal details
- Born: Gustavo Francisco Petro Urrego; 19 April 1960 (age 66) Ciénaga de Oro, Córdoba, Colombia
- Citizenship: Colombia; Italy
- Party: Historic Pact (since 2025)
- Other political affiliations: 19th of April Movement (1977–1997) (Note: Petro was a member of the guerrilla movement until its demobilization. And rejoined when it became a political party (the M-19 Democratic Alliance), which Petro remained a part of until 1997.); Alternative Way (1998–2002); Regional Integration Movement (2002–2005); Alternative Democratic Pole (2005–2010); Historic Pact for Colombia (2011–2025); Humane Colombia (2011–2026)
- Spouses: Katia Burgos (m. 1986; div. 1992) Mary Luz Herrán (m. 1992; div. 2000) Verónica Alcocer (m. 2000; div. 2026)
- Children: 6, including Nicolás, Andrea, Sofía and Antonella
- Education: Externado University of Colombia (BA)
- Website: gustavopetro.co
- Gustavo Petro's voice Gustavo Petro‘s speech for the March for Peace, Democracy and the Defense of the Public (recorded 9 April 2013)

Gustavo Francisco Petro Urrego (Note: Latin American Spanish: [ɡusˈtaβo fɾanˈsisko ˈpetɾo uˈreɣo].) (born 19 April 1960) is a Colombian politician and economist who served as the 35th president of Colombia from 2022 to 2026. He founded and leads the political party Historic Pact (PH) and is considered the first, and so far only, left-wing president in the recent history of Colombia.

At 17 years old, Petro joined the guerrilla group 19th of April Movement (M-19). Petro also served as a councilman in Zipaquirá. He was arrested in 1985 by the army for his affiliation with M-19, which had attacked the Palace of Justice that year and resulted in the death of 11 of the twenty-five justices in the Supreme Court of Justice of Colombia. After the peace process between the Colombian government and the M-19, he was released and later elected to the Chamber of Representatives in the 1991 parliamentary election. In the 2006 election, he was elected to the Colombian Senate as a member of the Alternative Democratic Pole (PDA). In 2009, he resigned his Senate seat to run in the 2010 Colombian presidential election, finishing fourth in the first round. Due to ideological disagreements with the leaders of the PDA, Petro founded the Humane Colombia party to compete for the mayoralty of Bogotá, and was elected mayor in 2011. He ran for president of Colombia in the 2018 election, losing the second round with 41.77% of the vote. He ran again in the 2022 presidential election, defeating Rodolfo Hernández Suárez in the second round with 50.42% of the vote.

As president, Petro pursued a progressive domestic agenda, increasing the minimum wage, strengthening the legal framework for labor protections, redistributing land to peasants, and increasing social spending. Poverty and unemployment declined during his presidency and public debt increased. His health and labor reforms stalled in Congress. His security policy, "Total Peace", which aimed to demobilize the country's remaining armed groups, has been criticized as ineffective. He is ending his term with an approval rating of about 50%, compared with a disapproval rating of 43%.

In foreign affairs, he restored diplomatic relations with Venezuela and suspended diplomatic ties with Israel over the Gaza war. Relations with the United States deteriorated sharply during Donald Trump's second term; shortly after Trump took office in January 2025, Colombia and the US had a dispute over deportation flights and in September, the US revoked Petro's US visa. The U.S. Treasury in October 2025 added Petro, his wife, his son, and his interior minister to its Specially Designated Nationals (SDN) list, alleging involvement in the global illicit drug trade.

For the 2026 Colombian presidential election, Petro was constitutionally barred from seeking a second term. He instead endorsed fellow Historic Pact Senator Iván Cepeda to be his successor. In what became the closest election in Colombia's history, Cepeda was narrowly defeated by Abelardo de la Espriella, who succeeded Petro as president of Colombia on August 7, 2026. Petro condemned foreign interference in this election. Hours later Petro acknowledged the results, announcing that his administration would begin the formal handover process.

== Early life ==
Petro was born on 19 April 1960 in the municipality of Ciénaga de Oro, Córdoba, Colombia. He is the son of Gustavo Petro Sierra and Clara Nubia Urrego. (Note: See section Place of birth.) Petro is predominantly descended from long-established mestizo Colombian families, though his father is of one quarter Italian descent through Petro's paternal great-grandfather, Francesco Petro, who migrated from Southern Italy in 1870, and Petro's mother is of half Italian descent via Petro's maternal grandmother, Lucia Pellegrini, who was from Conza della Campania, thus earning him dual Colombian and Italian citizenship.

Petro was raised in the Catholic faith and has stated that he has a vision of God from liberation theology, although he also questioned God's existence. Seeking a better future, Petro's family decided to migrate to the more prosperous Colombian inland town of Zipaquirá, just north of Bogotá, during the 1970s.

=== M-19 militancy ===
Convinced that the guerrilla struggle could change the political and economic system of Colombia, around the age of 17, Petro became a member of the 19th of April Movement (M-19), a Colombian guerrilla organisation that emerged in 1974 in opposition to the National Front coalition after allegations of fraud in the 1970 election. He used the pseudonym of Aureliano, a character in the novel One Hundred Years of Solitude.

During his time in M-19, Petro was elected ombudsman of Zipaquirá in 1981 and councilman from 1984 to 1986. He led the M-19's seizure of land to house 400 poor families who had been forcibly displaced by paramilitary groups, and then contributed to the construction of what would become the Bolívar 83 neighborhood. He then went underground and allied with Carlos Pizarro, one of the main commanders of the M-19, insisting on the need for a negotiated political solution to the Colombian armed conflict and the transition to a Constituent Assembly.

In 1985, Petro was arrested by the army for illegal arms possession. He was tortured for ten days in the stables of the XIII Brigade, then sentenced to 18 months in prison. It was during his incarceration that Petro shifted his ideology, no longer viewing armed resistance as a feasible strategy to gain public backing. In 1987, M-19 engaged in peace talks with the government.

=== Education ===
Petro graduated in 1982 with a bachelor's degree in economics from the Universidad Externado de Colombia and began graduate studies at the Escuela Superior de Administración Pública (ESAP). Later, he started a master's degree in economics from the Universidad Javeriana but never graduated. He then traveled to Belgium and started his graduate studies in Economy and Human Rights at the Université catholique de Louvain. He also began his studies towards a doctoral degree in public administration from the University of Salamanca in Spain.

In April 2016, an investigation by El Espectador concluded that three academic degrees listed by Gustavo Petro were false, as he had not obtained a specialization in Public Administration, a master’s degree in Economics, or a doctorate (PhD) in New Trends in Business Management as stated in his résumé. Petro confirmed the investigation in a column published in the same outlet, responding to the article about the false degrees, though he explained that for the specialization he had finished coursework but had not completed a thesis nor chosen another graduation option, saying he “simply wanted to study the specialization.” Regarding his master’s studies, he likewise said he completed coursework but did not receive the degree because he could not reach an agreement with the Pontifical Xavierian University about his thesis, and therefore did not finish it. Concerning the alleged doctorate, he stated he only completed the theoretical cycle, without developing research, and attended the semesters taught in Colombia, without traveling to Spain where the final semesters were held. Petro’s defense argued that while his résumé had inconsistencies like that of Enrique Peñalosa, he had in fact begun doctoral-level studies even if he did not finish them, so the cases were not comparable.

== Political career ==
=== Early career ===
After the demobilization of the M-19 movement, former members of the group (including Petro) formed a political party called the M-19 Democratic Alliance which won a significant number of seats in the Chamber of Representatives in 1991, representing the department of Cundinamarca. In July 1994, he met with Lieutenant Colonel Hugo Chávez (just released from prison after the February 1992 Venezuelan coup attempt) during an event on Bolivarian thought at the Simón Rodríguez Cultural Foundation in Bogotá, directed by José Cuesta, Petro's parliamentary assistant.

In 2002, Petro was elected to the Chamber of Representatives representing Bogotá, this time as a member of the Vía Alterna political movement he founded with former colleague Antonio Navarro Wolff and other former M-19 members. During this period, Petro received 25 votes of 125 consulted representatives to be chosen as the 2006 "Best Congressman", against 24 that held that no representative was worthy of being considered the best because the legislative period was characterized by absenteeism and shortage of sessions.

As a member of Vía Alterna, Petro created an electoral coalition with the Frente Social y Político to form the Independent Democratic Pole, which fused with the Alternativa Democrática in 2005 to form the Alternative Democratic Pole, joining a large number of leftist political figures.

In 2006, Petro was elected to the Senate, mobilizing the second highest voter turnout in the country. During that year he also exposed the parapolitics scandal, accusing members and followers of the government of mingling with paramilitary groups in order to "reclaim" Colombia.

==== Opposition to the Uribe government ====
Senator Petro vehemently opposed the government of Álvaro Uribe. In 2005, while a member of the Chamber of Representatives, Petro denounced the lottery businesswoman Enilse López (also known as "La Gata" [the cat]). As of May 2009, she was imprisoned and under investigation for ties to the (now disbanded) paramilitary group United Self-Defense Forces of Colombia (AUC). Petro alleged that the AUC financially contributed to the presidential campaign of Álvaro Uribe in 2002. Uribe refuted these statements by Petro but, during his presidential reelection campaign in 2006, admitted to having received financial support from Enilse López.

During Álvaro Uribe's second term as president, Petro encouraged debate on the Parapolitics scandal. In February 2007 Petro began a public verbal dispute with President Uribe when Petro suggested that the president should have recused himself from negotiating the demobilization process of paramilitaries in Colombia; this followed accusations that Uribe's brother, Santiago Uribe, was a former member of the Twelve Apostles paramilitary group in the mid-1990s. President Uribe responded by accusing Petro of being a "terrorist in civilian clothing" and by summoning the opposition to an open debate.

On 17 April 2007, Petro began a debate in Congress about CONVIVIR and the development of paramilitarism in Antioquia Department. During a two-hour speech, he revealed a variety of documents demonstrating the relationship between members of the Colombian military, the current political leadership, narcotraffickers and paramilitary groups. Petro also criticized the actions of Álvaro Uribe as Governor of Antioquia Department during the CONVIVIR years, and presented an old photograph of Álvaro Uribe's brother, Santiago, alongside Colombian drug trafficker Fabio Ochoa Vázquez.

The Minister of Interior and Justice, Carlos Holguín Sardi and the Minister of Transport, Andrés Uriel Gallego, were asked to defend the president and his government. Both of them questioned Petro's past as a revolutionary member and accused him of "not condemning the warfare of violent people". Most of Petro's arguments were condemned as mud-slinging. The day after this debate the president said "I would have been a great guerrilla because I wouldn't have been a guerrilla of mud, but a guerrilla of rifles. I would have been a military success, not a fake protagonist".

President Uribe's brother, Santiago Uribe, affirmed that his father and the Ochoa brothers had grown up together and were in the Paso Fino horse business together. He then mentioned that he also had many photographs, taken with many people.

On 18 April 2007, the Vigilance and Security Superintendency released a communique rejecting Petro's accusations concerning the CONVIVIR groups. The Superintendency said that many of the groups mentioned were authorized by the Departments of Sucre and Córdoba, but not by the Antioquia government; it also added that Álvaro Uribe, then Antioquia's governor, had eliminated the legal liability of eight CONVIVIR groups in 1997. It was also mentioned that the paramilitary leader known as "Julian Bolívar" had not yet been identified as such and was not associated with any CONVIVIR during the authorization of these groups.

==== Death threats ====
Petro has frequently reported threats against his life and the lives of his family, as well as persecution by government-run security organizations, which he says were motivated by complaints he raised in Congress. On 7 May 2007 the Colombian army captured two Colombian Army intelligence non-commissioned officers who had been spying on Petro and his family in the municipality of Tenjo, Cundinamarca. These members had first identified themselves as members of the Departamento Administrativo de Seguridad (DAS) the Colombian Intelligence Agency but their claims were later denied by Andrés Peñate, director of the agency.

In October 2008, Petro alleged, with documentary evidence, that officials of the Department of Administrative Security (DAS) had ordered illegal surveillance of members of the Polo Democrático, including himself, for opposing the government of Álvaro Uribe. As a result, María del Pilar Hurtado resigned and was later tried, convicted, and extradited to Colombia after fleeing to Panamá.

He received death threats from the paramilitary group Águilas Negras in 2020.

==== 2010 presidential campaign ====
In 2008, Petro announced his interest in a presidential candidacy for 2010. He distanced himself from government policies and, along with Lucho Garzón and Maria Emma Mejía, led a dissenting faction within the Alternative Democratic Pole. Following Garzón's resignation from the party, Petro proposed a "great national accord to end Colombia's war," based on removing organized crime from power, cleaning up the judicial system, land reform, democratic socialism and a security policy differing considerably from the policies of President Uribe. On 27 September 2009, Gustavo Petro defeated Carlos Gaviria in a primary election as the Alternative Democratic Pole candidate for the 2010 presidential election.

In the presidential election held on 30 May 2010, Petro did better than polls had predicted. He obtained a total of 1,331,267 votes, 9.1% of the total, finishing as the fourth candidate in the vote total, behind Germán Vargas Lleras and ahead of Noemí Sanín.

=== Mayoralty of Bogotá (2012–2014; 2014–2015) ===
On 30 October 2011, Gustavo Petro won the municipal election in Bogotá. He took office on 1 January 2012. He is the first ex-guerrilla to hold such an important position in Colombia.

The program of his Bogotá Humana movement was to fight poverty and inequality through public policies for the poorest, to protect the environment and fight climate change, to strengthen citizen participation in decision-making, and to fight structural corruption, as the previous mayor and his senatorial brother had enriched themselves by granting public contracts to companies in exchange for bribes. However, his program is not well received by the traditional ruling classes; even before his inauguration, several media outlets were calling for his resignation.

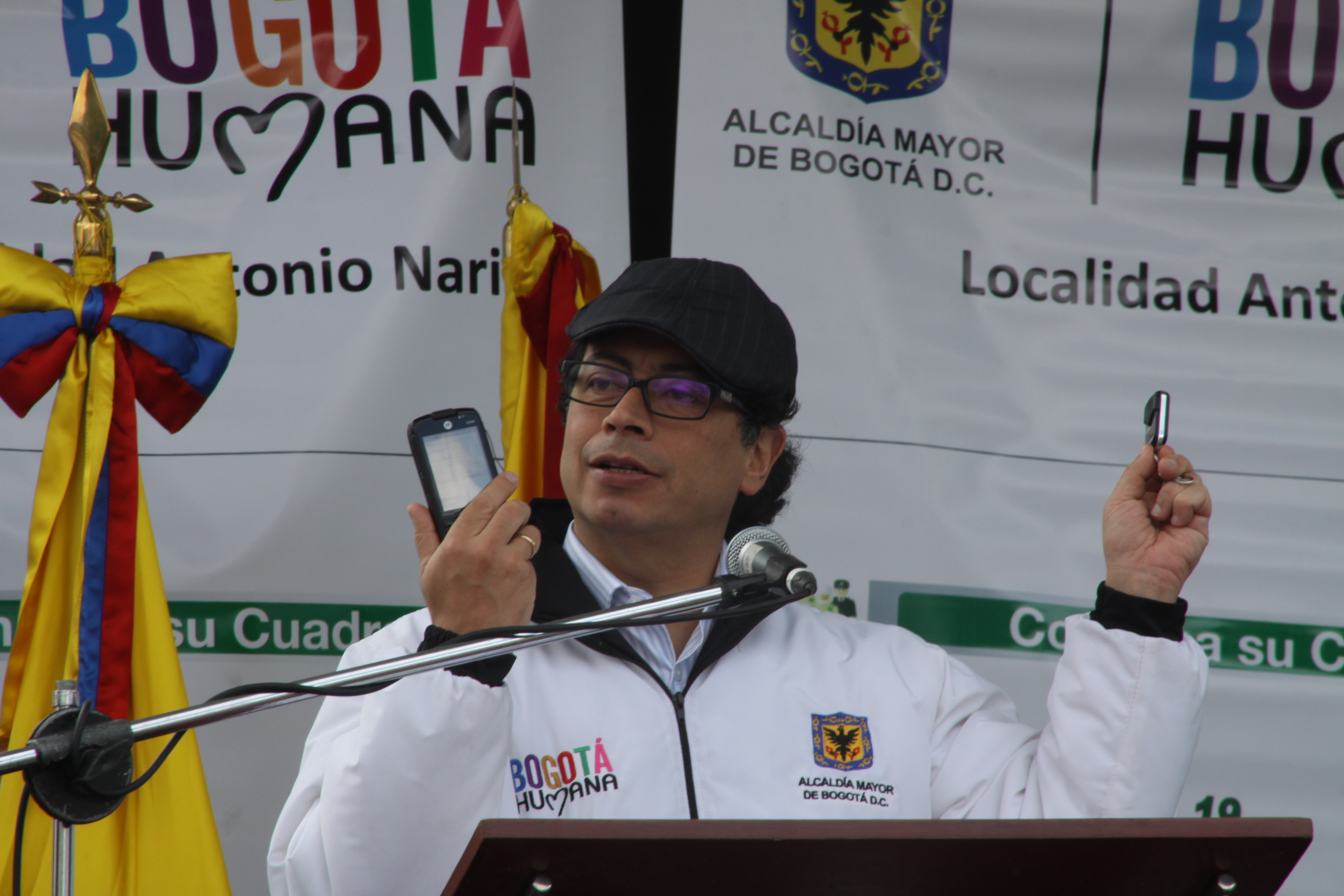
Mayor Petro in 2012

During Petro's administration, measures such as the prohibition on the carrying of firearms were advanced, which led to the reduction of the homicide rate, reaching the lowest figure of the last two decades; interventions were carried out by the police in El Bronx sector of the city, where seizures of drugs and weapons were made; the Women's Secretariat was created; the LGBTI Citizenship Center was inaugurated; and 49 centers for birth control and abortion care were also created in cases permitted by law.

The social policies implemented and the improvement of public services accelerated the reduction of poverty; during his administration, nearly half a million people were lifted out of poverty and infant mortality dropped. This is the result of a combination of public policies (minimum drinking water supply for every family, preventive health program in poor neighborhoods, kindergartens, strengthening of public education, youth centers for art education, preferential transportation rates for the poor).

Petro proposed a policy to conserve the wetlands of Bogotá and plan for the preservation of water in the face of global warming. He also announced plans to plant over 200,000 trees. Following the order of the Constitutional Court, a process of suppression of animal-drawn vehicles used by waste pickers began, putting many out of work; some were replaced by automotive vehicles and subsidies.

In June 2012, Petro banned bullfighting within the Santamaría Bullring, a measure that was later rejected by the Constitutional Court.

In the area of public health, Mobile Attention Centers for Drug Addicts (CAMAD) were established. With these measures, the aim was to reduce the dependency of the destitute in the streets of the sector to the providers of narcotic drugs, providing psychological and medical assistance.

During his administration, the District put into operation two primary-care clinics at the San Juan de Dios Hospital, which had closed in 2001. The Mayor promised that he would allocate resources to purchase the hospital grounds and reopen one of the buildings of the complex. The project was delayed due to the Cundinamarca government's suspension of the sale of the properties. On 11 February 2015, as mayor of Bogotá, the protocol ceremony for the reopening of the San Juan de Dios Hospital Complex was finally formalized. The District bought the hospital intending to reopen it. During his last month in office, before the liquidation of Saludcoop on 1 December 2015, the district had difficulties with the new patients who became part of the EPS Capital Salud.

During Petro's administration, the application of the Integrated Public Transport System (SITP) began, inaugurated in mid-2012. Likewise, subsidies paid by the District to reduce Transmilenio tariffs were created. In turn, from early 2014 the administration provided a 40% subsidy for the value of the ticket for the population affiliated to SISBEN 1 and 2, for which it allocated 138 billion pesos. This subsidy was not available to all individuals immediately, as they were required to register in a database.

Petro proposed the construction of a subway for the city. During his administration, he contracted studies of the subway infrastructure to a Colombian-Spanish company for $70 billion pesos, which successfully ended at the end of 2014. The subway plans contracted by Petro's administration were discarded by his successor Enrique Peñalosa, who opted for an elevated railway system with lower capital expenditure and greater coverage. Detractors of the new plan claimed that the social and economic cost of an elevated railway system would be higher than the original underground railway system planned by the previous administration.

==== Recall ====
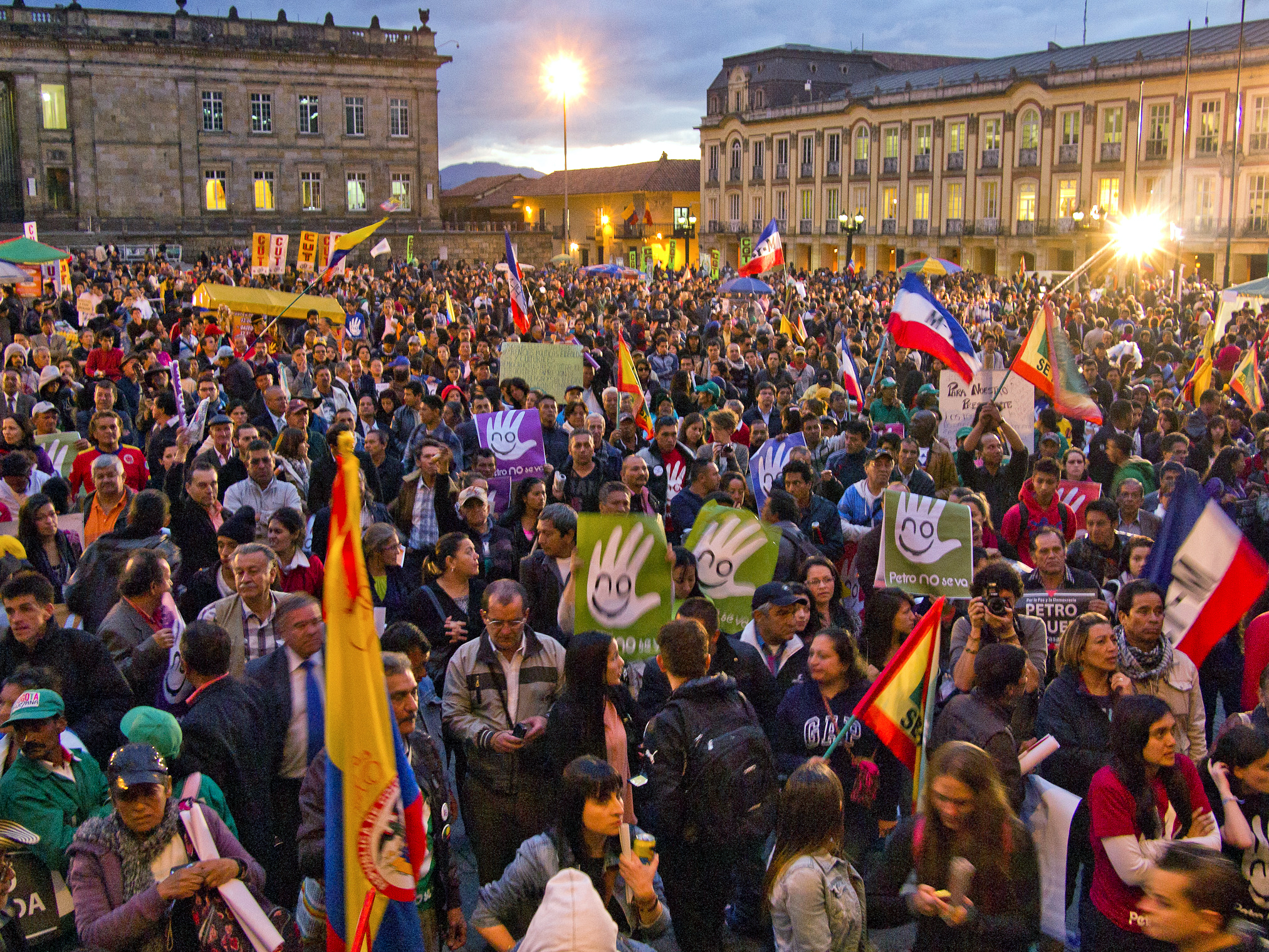
Protesters in Bolívar Square, Bogotá, demonstrating against Petro's removal from the mayoralty, March 2014

During his administration as mayor, Petro faced a recall process started by opposition parties and supported by the signatures of more than 600,000 citizens. After the legal verification, 357,250 signatures were validated, many more than legally required to start the process. On 9 December 2013, he was removed from his seat and banned from political activity for 15 years, by Inspector General Alejandro Ordóñez Maldonado, following the sanctions stipulated by the law. His sanction was allegedly caused by mismanagement and illegal decrees signed during the implementation of his waste collection system. This led to a protest which deemed the Inspector's move as controversial, politically biased and undemocratic.

Despite being granted an injunction by the Inter-American Commission on Human Rights, which suspended the sanction imposed by Inspector General Ordóñez, President Juan Manuel Santos upheld the removal and Petro was removed from office on 19 March 2014. For his temporary replacement, Santos appointed as Mayor the Labor Minister, Rafael Pardo Rueda. On 19 April 2014, a magistrate from the Superior Tribunal of Bogotá ordered the president to obey the recommendations laid out by the Inter-American Commission on Human Rights. Petro was reinstated as mayor on 23 April 2014 and finished his term.

=== 2018 presidential campaign ===
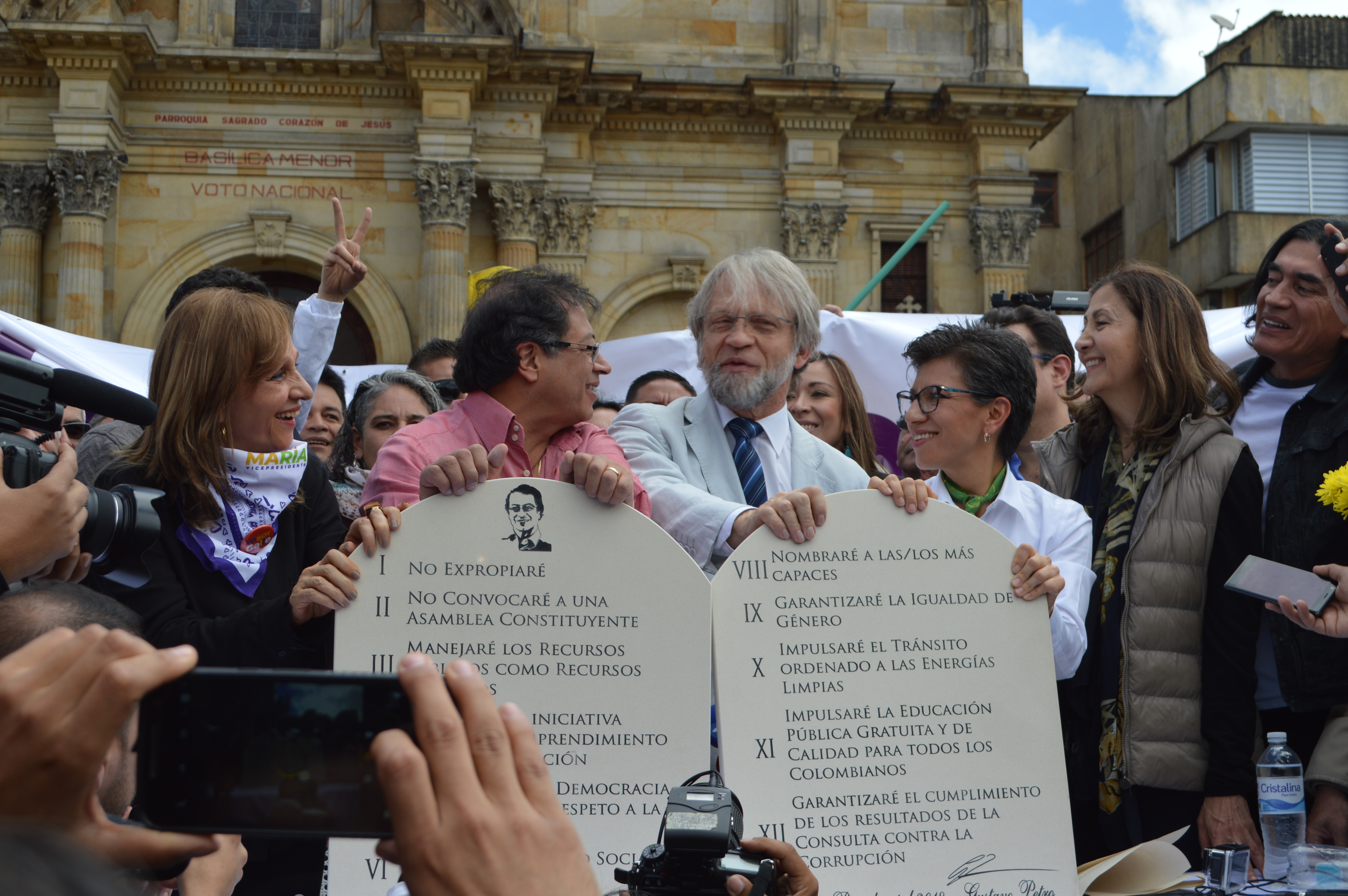
Petro and his running mate Ángela Robledo (far left) receiving endorsements from Antanas Mockus (third from left) and Claudia López Hernández (third from right) at an event in Bogotá, during the campaign for the second round, June 2018

In 2018, Gustavo Petro was again a presidential candidate, this time getting the second best result in voting counting in the first round on 27 May, and advanced to the second round. His campaign was run by publicists Ángel Beccassino, Alberto Cienfuegos and Luis Fernando Pardo. A lawsuit was filed by citizens against Iván Duque, Petro's right-wing opponent, alleging bribery and fraud. The news chain Wradio made the lawsuit public on 11 July, which was presented to the CNE ('Consejo Nacional Electoral', National Electoral Council, by its acronym in Spanish). The state of the lawsuit will be defined by the Magistrado Alberto Yepes.

Petro's platform emphasized support for universal health care, public banking, a rejection of proposals to expand fracking and mining in favor of investing in clean energy, and land reform. Before the runoff, Petro received endorsements from senator-elect Antanas Mockus and senator Claudia López Hernández, both members of the Green Alliance.

In the second round of voting, Duque won the election with more than 10 million votes, while Petro took second place with 8 million votes. Duque was inaugurated on 7 August. Petro returned to the Senate.

=== Senator of Colombia ===
He served as Senator of Colombia from 2018 until the inauguration of a new congress in 2022.

On 30 July 2021, Gustavo Petro stated on Twitter that vaccines did not work against the Delta variant of COVID-19 “according to the first investigations,” adding: “It spreads faster. It is already in Colombia. The health debate must be revived.” The message sparked controversy on social media. The Minister of Health and Social Protection, Fernando Ruiz Gómez, former Medellín mayor Federico Gutiérrez, and congresswoman Catalina Ortiz Lalinde responded. Twitter labeled Petro’s tweet as misleading. Petro explained in another tweet that the person who had said vaccines did not work for that variant, according to early studies, was U.S. epidemiologist Dr. Fauci. The next day he retracted, saying his earlier tweet could “mislead an unwary reader,” and clarified that vaccines “do work to prevent death and hospitalization,” urging people to get vaccinated. On 3 August, he received a second Pfizer dose and again urged Colombians to get vaccinated, saying: “Second dose. Get vaccinated now. Delta has already arrived in the country.”

Petro received death threats from the paramilitary group Águilas Negras.

On 27 November 2018, during a political oversight debate on the Odebrecht scandal, called by Petro and other opposition members, in which then–Attorney General Néstor Humberto Martínez was summoned to respond over alleged links to the Brazilian multinational, Senator Paloma Valencia revealed a video showing Petro receiving twenty million pesos (about US$5,000), in small-denomination bills, from Juan Carlos Montes, a former Bogotá city official under Petro’s administration. According to Petro, the video was recorded in 2005 and was illegally taken from Montes’s home; he accused Martínez of participating in the operation. Petro said the money came from architect Simón Vélez, who had been asked for a loan. He also criticized the fact that the video was first shown without audio and that its origin dated from much earlier than Valencia claimed.

In an interview with Caracol Radio, Vélez said he had never lent money in the name of Petro’s 2010 presidential campaign, but clarified that he had helped by looking for donors for Petro’s campaigns.

In February 2021, the National Electoral Council (CNE) closed the investigation previously pursued by the Prosecutor’s Office and the Supreme Court of Colombia, arguing that the alleged irregularities were time-barred because the law only allows investigation of events from the last three years. The magistrates also said there were no reasons to doubt Montes’s statement about the timing of the events. In that hearing, Montes said the roughly twenty million pesos were a sum of small donations, including people giving up to five thousand pesos, collected for Petro’s 2006 Senate campaign. Montes also said it was not a hidden recording. Petro argued that the video was presented in that oversight debate to divert attention from Martínez’s role in the Odebrecht scandal.

=== 2022 presidential campaign ===
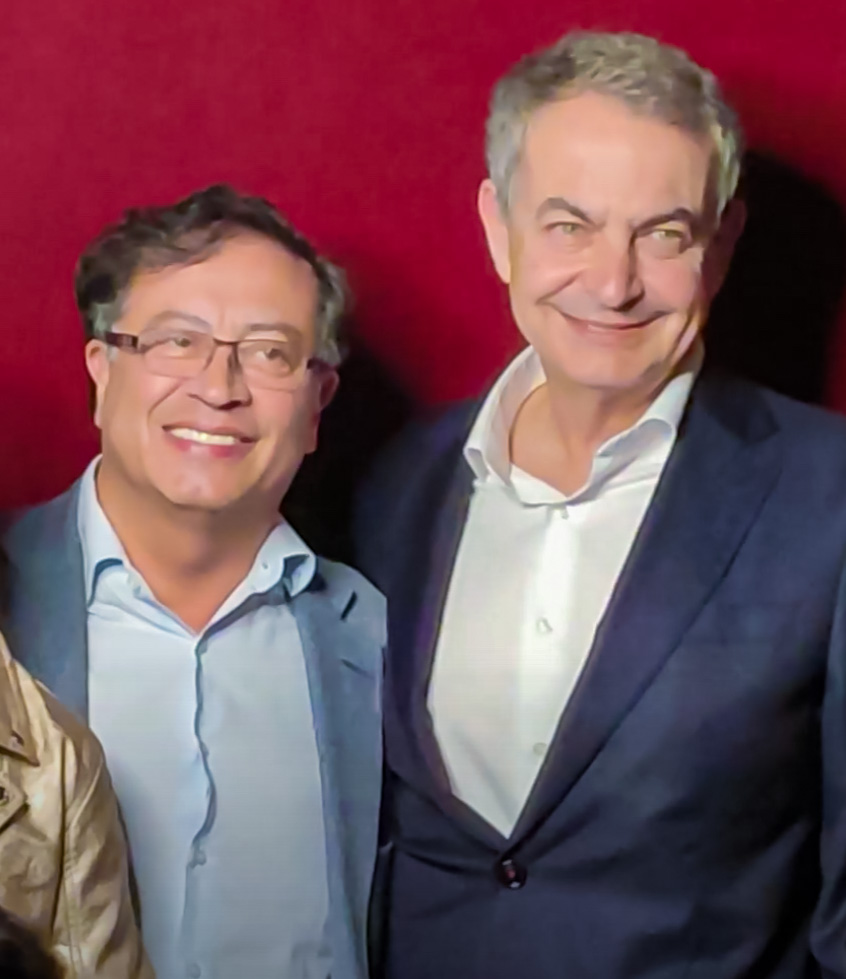
Petro with former prime minister of Spain, José Luis Rodríguez Zapatero, in 2022

In 2021, Petro declared that he would be running in the 2022 elections. In September 2021, Petro announced that he would retire from politics if his campaign were not to succeed, stating that he does not intend to be an "eternal candidate". Petro's campaign platform included promoting green energy over fossil fuels and a decrease in economic inequality. He has promised to focus on climate change and reducing greenhouse gas emissions that cause it by ending fossil fuel exploration in Colombia. He also pledged to raise taxes on the wealthiest 4,000 Colombians and said that neoliberalism would ultimately "destroy the country". Petro also announced that he would be open to having president Iván Duque stand trial for police brutality committed during the 2021 Colombian protests. Furthermore, he promised to establish the ministry of equality. Following his victory in the Historic Pact primary, Petro selected Afro-Colombian Human Rights and environmental activist and recipient of the Goldman Environmental Prize, Francia Márquez, to be his running mate.

Among the key points of his program, he proposes an agrarian reform to restore productivity to 15 million hectares of land to end "narco-feudalism" (in Spanish, "narco-latifundismo"); a halt to all new oil exploration in order to wean the country off its dependence on the extractive and fossil fuel industries; infrastructure for access to water and development of the rail network; investment in public education and research; tax reform and reform of the largely privatized health system. Petro announced that his first act as president will be to declare a state of economic emergency to combat widespread hunger. He is advocating progressive proposals on women's rights and LGBTQ issues. Petro also stated that he would restore diplomatic relations with Venezuela. He proposed combatting Colombia's cocaine trade with the growth of legal marijuana, and has opposed extraditions of accused drug criminals to the United States.

Petro and his running mate Francia Márquez faced numerous death threats from paramilitary groups while on the campaign trail. Petro cancelled rallies in Colombiaʼs coffee region in early May 2022 after his security team uncovered an alleged plot by the La Cordillera gang. In response to this and many other similar situations, 90 elected officials and prominent individuals from over 20 countries signed an open letter expressing concern and condemnation of attempts of political violence against Márquez and Petro. The letter also highlighted the assassination of over 50 social leaders, trade unionists, environmentalists and other community representatives in 2022. Signatories of the letter included former Ecuadorian president Rafael Correa, American linguist and philosopher Noam Chomsky and member of the French National Assembly Jean-Luc Mélenchon. During the campaign, Petro received support from foreign politicians, such as former president of Uruguay, José Mujica and former Prime Minister of Spain, José Luis Rodríguez Zapatero.

During the campaign, his opponents said that he planned expropriation measures if he becomes president, and argued similarities with Venezuela's Nicolás Maduro. Proposals from Petro to change the nation's economic model were criticized for increasing taxes on unproductive landowners and for upsetting oil and coal investors by his platform to move to clean energy. Critics said his efforts to shift more of Colombia's wealth to the poor could turn Colombia into another Venezuela, and also compared his ideas to those of the early days of Hugo Chávez's government in Venezuela. In response, he signed a public document on 18 April in which he pledged not to carry out any type of expropriation if elected. During a presidential debate hosted by El Tiempo on 14 March, candidates responded to a question about relations with Venezuela and Nicolás Maduro. Whilst other participants responded by stating Venezuela is a dictatorship and expressing reluctance toward restoring relations, Petro replied, "if the theory is that with a dictatorship you can't have diplomatic relations, and Venezuela is, [then] why does this government have relations with the United Arab Emirates, which is a dictatorship, perhaps worse [than Venezuela]?". He also stated that diplomatic relations are established with nations and not with individuals. Whilst he has praised former Venezuelan president Hugo Chávez for bolstering equality, Petro said during an interview with French newspaper Le Monde in May 2022 that Chávez made a "serious mistake of linking his social program to oil revenues". He also criticized Venezuela's commitment to oil by president Maduro. Petro argued that "Maduro's Venezuela and Duque's Colombia are more similar than they seem", pointing to the Duque administration's commitment to non-renewable energy and the "authoritarian drift" of both governments. General Eduardo Zapateiro, commander of the National Army of Colombia, also criticized Petro during the campaign, causing controversy. Later, after the elections, the Colombian media Noticias Uno revealed that Gustavo Petro's campaign had been spied on by Colombian intelligence agents and that information had been passed on to the press to try to discredit him.

Petro received the most votes in the first round held on 29 May but fell short of the 50% required to avoid a runoff. He and Márquez faced the former mayor of Bucaramanga and businessman, Rodolfo Hernández Suárez and his running mate Marelen Castillo in the run-off on 19 June. Shortly after the first round, Luis Gilberto Murillo, who was the running mate of Sergio Fajardo on the Hope Center Coalition ticket, endorsed Petro for the second round. In the second round, Petro and Márquez won the election by winning 50.44% of the popular vote against Hernández.

== Presidency (2022–2026) ==
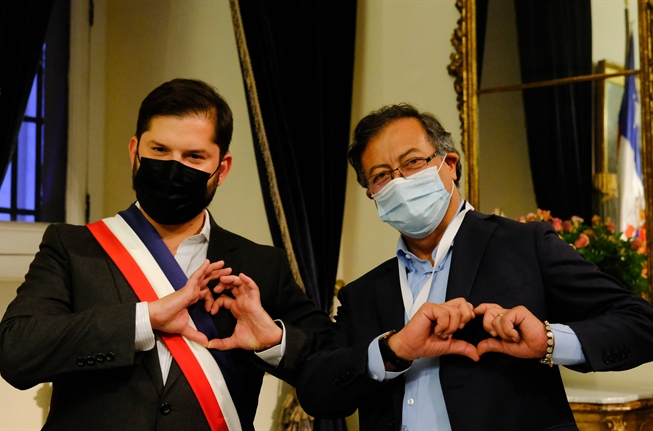
Chilean President Gabriel Boric and Gustavo Petro shortly before his inauguration, 6 August 2022

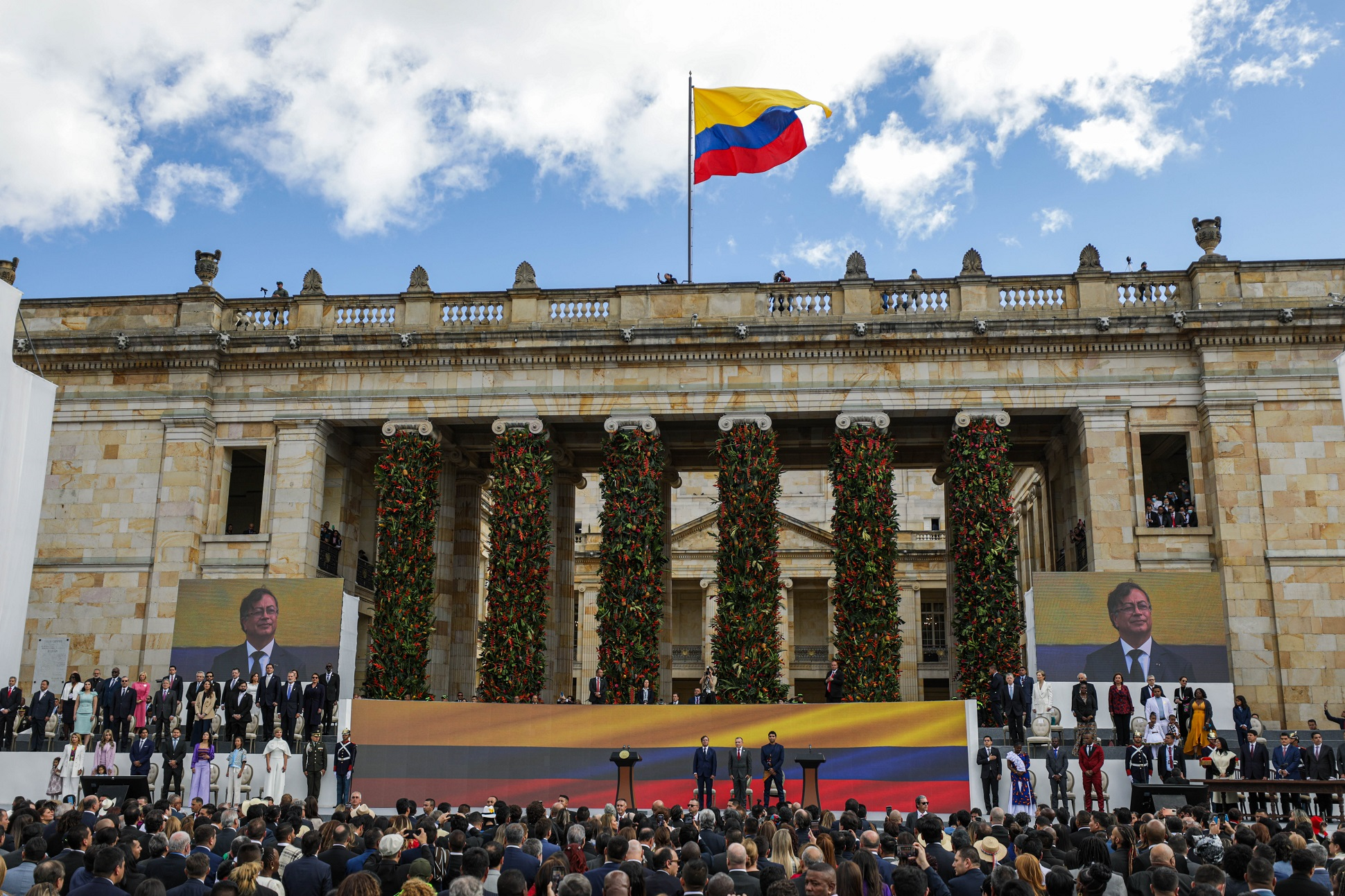
Presidential inauguration ceremony

Petro was sworn in on 7 August 2022.

He spent the month and a half between his election and his inauguration negotiating with centrist and right-wing political parties to build a majority in Congress, where the left had a minority in both houses. He had an early success in building a congressional coalition, said Fitch. In exchange for several seats in his government, he obtained the support of the Liberal Party, the largest force in the House and third largest in the Senate, and the Party of the U. Both parties had called for votes against him in both the first and second rounds of the presidential election. In the end, his coalition included a dozen political groups, had seasoned ministers, and was considered by The Economist as "moderate". The Liberal Party left Petro's governing coalition on 28 November 2023, citing significant ideological differences. The conservative reformist Álvaro Leyva was appointed to the Ministry of Foreign Affairs, and three former liberal ministers were appointed to Finance, Agriculture and Education. Human rights activist Leonor Zalabata was named ambassador to the United Nations, making her the first indigenous person to be appointed to the post, which until now has always been held by career diplomats.

A few days before his inauguration, on 26 July, he passed his first political test with the approval by the Senate of the Escazú Agreement, the most important environmental protection treaty adopted in Latin America, which had previously been rejected four times by the senators. Petro had made its ratification a campaign promise. However, the team in charge of the transition from the outgoing government warns that "the fiscal situation and the level of debt are even more critical than we imagined."

The arrival of Gustavo Petro as president was not well received by the army command and several generals spoke out in the press. The commander in chief of the army, Enrique Zapateiro, resigned from his position. On 12 August Petro appointed a new military command with the objective of "substantially increasing respect for human rights and public freedoms."

Colombia and Venezuela re-established diplomatic relations on 11 August after a three-year break. Petro announced plans to resume peace negotiations with the National Liberation Army (ELN) guerrillas, which had been suspended after the 2019 Bogotá car bombing, where more than 20 cadets at a police academy were killed. The government's "Total Peace" policy has reduced violence, but some armed groups have grown stronger.

In December 2025, Petro declared an economic state of emergency allowing his government to issue taxes by decree.

On 10 June 2026, Gloria Arizabaleta, president of Colombia’s Commission of Investigation and Accusation, proposed suspending President Gustavo Petro from his duties until 21 June amid an investigation into alleged political meddling in the presidential runoff campaign of Iván Cepeda.

=== Cabinet ===
The cabinet of Petro's government took office on 7 August 2022, in conjunction with the inauguration of the president. After taking office, Petro was considered by analysts as Colombia's first-ever left-wing president, although this claim has been disputed by Charlotte Eaton of the London School of Economics who asserted that it was the two-term president Alfonso López Pumarejo (1934–1938 and 1942–1946) of the Colombian Liberal Party instead.

José Antonio Ocampo, Professor of Economic and Political Development Concentration at the School of International and Public Affairs at Columbia University and former Under-Secretary-General for Economic and Social Affairs in the United Nations was appointed as Minister of Finance.

In 2025, Petro sacked his whole government following his previous choice to appoint the scandal-ridden political operator Armando Benedetti as chief of staff, while promoting Laura Sarabia, a 30-year-old confidante, to foreign minister despite her lack of foreign policy experience. Both were embroiled in a campaign finance scandal.

=== Protests ===
A series of protests began in Colombia on 26 September 2022 against the cross-sectoral structural reforms of President Petro and the government. The protests continued on 20 June 2023 in major cities, motivated by his political agenda, the alleged drug-money involved on his 2022 presidential campaign, and accusations of possibly illegal interceptions to civilians by close members of his cabinet. A scandal emerged nicknamed "Nannygate" and involving recordings of his ambassador in Venezuela, Armando Benedetti, speaking with Petro's Chief of Staff, Laura Sarabia, over possible illegal financing and threats of revealing compromising information on campaign running. Both of them had to resign his position as a result of this.

=== Agrarian reform ===
At the beginning of his presidency, Gustavo Petro announced that he wanted to initiate agrarian reform to promote access to property for poor peasant families in a country where one per cent of farms hold 80 per cent of the cultivable land. Several difficulties must be overcome: the land registry is largely deficient (according to an official estimate, 65% of land is not formally titled), the state lacks the institutions and officials to enforce the law, and there are fears that the large landowners will rearm their paramilitary militias. Finally, indigenous and peasant movements have increased their land occupations to put pressure on the new government.

While it does not foresee any expropriation, the government intends to enforce the first chapter of the peace agreement signed in 2016 between the state and the FARC. The first chapter of the agreement, which was devoted to the agrarian question, provided for the distribution of three million hectares to peasants, but the government of Ivan Duque never implemented it. On the other hand, the government committed itself to buying three million hectares of arable land at market price. An agreement to this effect was reached in early October 2022 with the powerful Federation of Ranchers (Fedegan). However, the agreement has been criticized by the mayor of Bogotá, Claudia López Hernández, who said that "the land grabbers must be told the truth and receive compensation. They do not deserve impunity, let alone billions," recalling that the report of the Truth Commission confirms the historical responsibility of the ranchers in paramilitarism, displacement and land plundering. In addition, some experts on agrarian issues have estimated that the land purchases would have a high cost for the public finances: "Since the market is not competitive, the ranchers will sell at a high price." The government has also pledged to build infrastructure to enable farmers to sell their crops.

=== Approval ratings ===
Petro took office in August 2022 with an approval rating of 48%. By the start of 2023, more Colombians disapproved of Petro's performance than approved. In March 2023, 53% disapproved of his performance. Residents in the eastern region of Colombia, Bogotá and the central region were most likely to disapprove of Petro.

By June 2023, 26-33% of Colombians approved of Petro's performance, and 61% disapproved. His disapproval rate fell to 66% in December, with only 26% approving. By June 2025, his approval rating remained in the 27% area, with disapproval at 67%.

By March 2026, 54% of Colombians approved of Petro's performance, and 38% disapproved.

Since taking office, Petro and his allies have been embroiled in several scandals. In 2025, Petro sacked his whole government following his previous choice to appoint the scandal-ridden political operator Armando Benedetti as chief of staff, while promoting Laura Sarabia, a 30-year-old confidante, to foreign minister despite her lack of foreign policy experience. Both were embroiled in a campaign finance scandal. Several factors such as heightened crime, his stalled reforms in the legislative branch, failing to pass labor and health reforms, as well as his frequent use of presidential decrees, being the first president to use it for a budget in 2024 since 1904, his disagreements with the Office of the Attorney General of Colombia and his supporters' violent attack against the Supreme Court, the arrest of his son Nicolas in a money laundering scandal involving campaign financing, and the scandal involving his ministers, have contributed to the fall of Petro's public support in 2024 and 2025, until it recovered in 2026. Petro and his allies were also embroiled in several scandals during his term. In 2025, Petro sacked his whole government right after appointing Armando Benedetti as chief of staff and Laura Sarabia as foreign minister as they had both been embroiled in the campaign finance scandal.

Petro's public image has also been marred by his "erratic behaviour". In 2025, the Financial Times noted that Petro "frequently turn[ed] up late to important meetings or misse[d] them and has disappeared from public view for days at a time," and noted that he was in the habit of making "long, rambling posts on social media in the early hours of the morning". One such notable post followed a public spat with Donald Trump, in which he variously referenced Sacco and Vanzetti, his gastritis, the Caliphate of Cordoba, and seeing "Blacks and Latinos fighting" in Washington, D.C. In April 2025, Álvaro Leyva, Petro's former foreign minister, publicly accused Petro of being a drug addict, saying that he had disappeared for two days during a visit to Paris. This followed a November 2023 article by left-wing investigative journalist María Jimena Duzán that likewise suggested that Petro's behavior "had to do with a problem of addiction". Petro has denied such claims and said that "the only addiction which I have is to coffee in the morning".

=== Relations with the United States ===
In January 2025, a dispute arose between Colombia and the United States after President Petro had refused to allow two previously authorized US military aircraft carrying deported Colombian nationals to land in Colombia. Each flight was carrying approximately 80 Colombians. In response, President Trump of the U.S. initially threatened to impose 25% tariffs on all Colombian imports, implement travel bans and visa revocations for Colombian government officials, and to implement enhanced customs and border protection inspections for all Colombian nationals and cargo from Colombia. Trump said he would double the tariffs to 50 percent in one week if Petro did not reverse his decision. The government did not go ahead with these plans after Colombia agreed to accept deported migrants. Diplomats from both countries reached a deal which has seen Colombia send its own air force planes to collect the migrants, a process that Petro said ensured they were treated "with dignity" and without being handcuffed. The U.S. government did make concessions to Colombia by agreeing not to handcuff and photograph the deportees, and dispatching Homeland Security staffers, instead of military officers, as flight escorts.

Earlier in the dispute, president Petro had criticised the use of US military for deportation flights noting: "We are the opposite of the Nazis," and that he would never carry out a raid to return handcuffed Americans to the US. President Petro, during the social media exchange stated, "I do not shake hands with white enslavers," and questioned whether president Trump was trying to topple him. The president's daughter Andrea Petro posted, "For every Colombian deported we will return a gringo from the Poblado," seemingly alluding to the 2024 extradition request by the US concerning an American citizen.

At a public event in New York in September 2025, President Gustavo Petro proposed creating a volunteer force of Colombians to fight in Gaza. The announcement was criticized by El Espectador, which said he had previously rejected the participation of Colombians as “mercenaries” in the wars in Ukraine and Sudan.

That same day, he spoke at a pro-Palestinian demonstration on 26 September 2025, at Dag Hammarskjöld Plaza outside U.N. Headquarters during the 80th United Nations General Assembly in New York City. Petro urged U.S. soldiers "not to point their guns at people. Disobey the orders of Trump. Obey the orders of humanity". In response, the United States Department of State announced the revocation of Petro’s visa, calling his remarks “irresponsible and incendiary.”

On 19 October 2025, Trump accused Petro of being the leader of the Colombian cartels calling subsidies to the Colombian government to curb and halt drug production a scam, which would be permanently blocked. On 24 October, the US Treasury Department placed sanctions on Petro, along with his wife, son and Armando Benedetti, by introducing them into the Specially Designated Nationals and Blocked Persons List, accusing the group of being involved in the global illicit drug trade. Petro responded, "I don’t do business like you do — I am a socialist. I believe in solidarity, the common good, and the shared resources of humanity, the greatest of all: life, now endangered by your oil". Trump said that if cocaine production is not stopped on Colombian territory, the United States would take direct action to stop the production and massive drug trade, including on Colombian territory.

Hours later, the Colombian Banking Association (Asobancaria) said that the country’s financial entities would strictly comply with international regulations and protocols required by the Office of Foreign Assets Control (OFAC), which administers the list.

Following the 2026 United States strikes in Venezuela on 3 January, Trump again criticized Petro, saying he "likes making cocaine and selling it to the US" and would not stay in power much longer. In response, Petro warned that he would "take up arms" again for Colombia if necessary, referring to his background as a guerrilla fighter. Petro also accused Trump of killing "a Colombian mother" due to the death of Yohana Rodríguez during the US strikes in Venezuela, adding that Colombians celebrating the attacks were nostalgic for having a king, to "enslave Colombia and murder their own people as they are used to doing."

In February 2026, a highly anticipated meeting between Petro and Trump at the White House apparently came to a cordial end.

=== Decretazo ===
In June 2025, Gustavo Petro introduced a decree calling a popular consultation even though Congress had issued a negative prior opinion. This triggered multiple annulment lawsuits before the Council of State. Petro repealed the decree days later, but disciplinary investigations were opened against his ministers for signing it, and the issue continues to be discussed in some publications.

=== Assassination and coup allegations ===
Petro alleged multiple assassination plots orchestrated by a combination of drug cartels, paramilitary factions, and American economic interests hostile to his socialist policies. In 2024, Petro publicly denounced a plot that forced him to cancel his appearance at a military parade on 20 July.

In February 2026, Petro claimed he narrowly survived a highly coordinated assassination attempt while traveling by helicopter to Montería, the capital of the Córdoba Department. According to Petro, state intelligence warned that the landing zone had been compromised by armed actors planning to shoot down the aircraft. The landing lights at the designated destination had been deliberately deactivated. Forced to abort the landing, the helicopter carrying Petro and his children flew over the open sea for four hours until authorities could secure a safe alternative landing site. In the same month, amid rising political tensions ahead of national elections and a scheduled bilateral meeting with U.S. President Donald Trump, Petro publicly denounced a conspiracy to plant "psychoactive substances", reportedly cocaine, inside one of his official presidential vehicles. During a live-broadcast cabinet meeting in Montería, he stated the objective of the operation was to falsely frame him as a drug trafficker, discredit his administration domestically, and "destroy the meeting" at the White House.

The president alleged the plot was organized by a coalition of domestic mafias and transnational crime organizations, and asserted that "foreign money has financed this operation" as part of a broader effort to destabilize his government. Following the discovery of the plot, Petro fired a police general whose unit was suspected of involvement and ordered the Ministry of Defense to launch a sweeping review of military and police intelligence agencies to neutralize the threat.

Investigative reporting indicated that the scheme exacerbated deep ideological rifts between Colombia's traditional military intelligence apparatus and the civilian National Intelligence Directorate (DNI), which Petro had recently restructured under the leadership of his trusted former M-19 allies. Sources close to the presidency suggested the sabotage was manufactured by rogue intelligence sectors working in coordination with foreign agencies seeking to exploit Washington's renewed scrutiny of Petro's administration.

== Policies and views ==
=== Environmental issues ===
In a widely recognized speech before the United Nations General Assembly on 20 September 2022, Petro asked the question "What is more poisonous for humanity, cocaine, coal or oil?" He said the "addiction to irrational power, profit and money” being at the heart of the climate crisis and called the war on drugs a failure, accusing the global north of turning a blind eye to the destruction of the Amazon rainforest.

According to a government statement and the Institute of Hydrology, Meteorology and Environmental Studies (Colombia) (IDEAM) deforestation rates in the Colombian Amazon fell by 70% in the first 9 months of 2023 going from 59,345 hectares deforested to 17,909 hectares, compared to the same period in the previous year, what can be attributed to the conservation policies of the government, like paying local residents for conserving the forest. However, the Minister of Environment and Sustainable Development, Susana Muhamad followed this up with the statement that: “These figures indicate a trend, it is not the official data. As we promised, we want to show the country how deforestation is going. This is an encouraging figure, but we do not want to be triumphalist, nor communicate that here we are already winning the battle against deforestation" (translated from Spanish).

According to the World Resources Institute, old-growth forest loss in Colombia was nearly halved in 2023 partly due to Gustavo Petro's policies. The Natural Resources Manager of the institute in Colombia, Alejandra Laina stated: "The story of deforestation in Colombia is complex and deeply intertwined with the country’s politics, which makes 2023’s historic decrease particularly powerful…”, adding: “There is no doubt that recent government action and the commitment of the communities has had a profound impact on Colombia’s forests, and we encourage those involved in current peace talks to use this data as a springboard to accelerate further progress.” The institute noted that overall, the world still lost 10 football fields of tropical forests per minute in 2023.

=== Foreign affairs ===
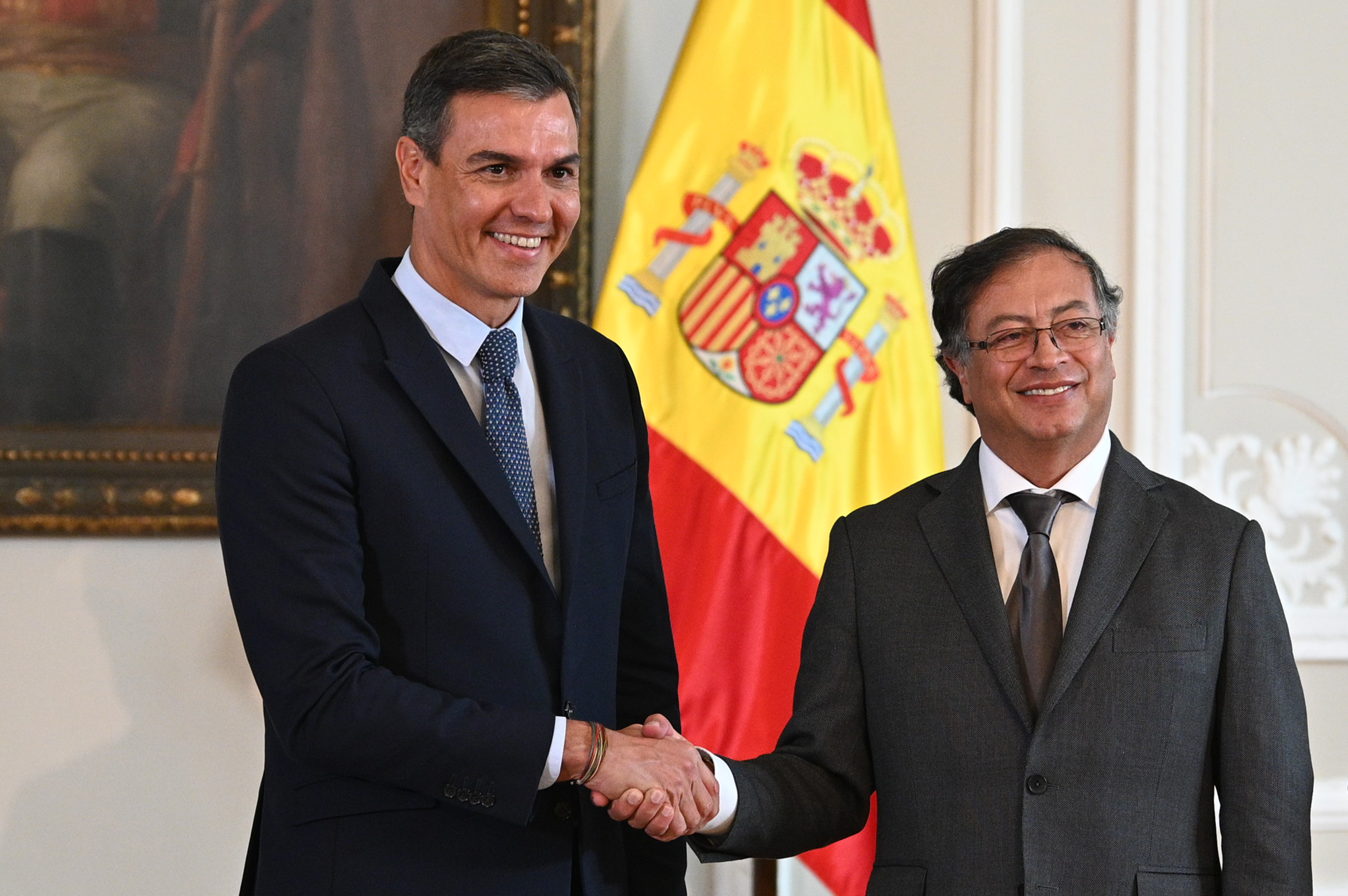
Petro with Spanish Prime Minister Pedro Sánchez in August 2022

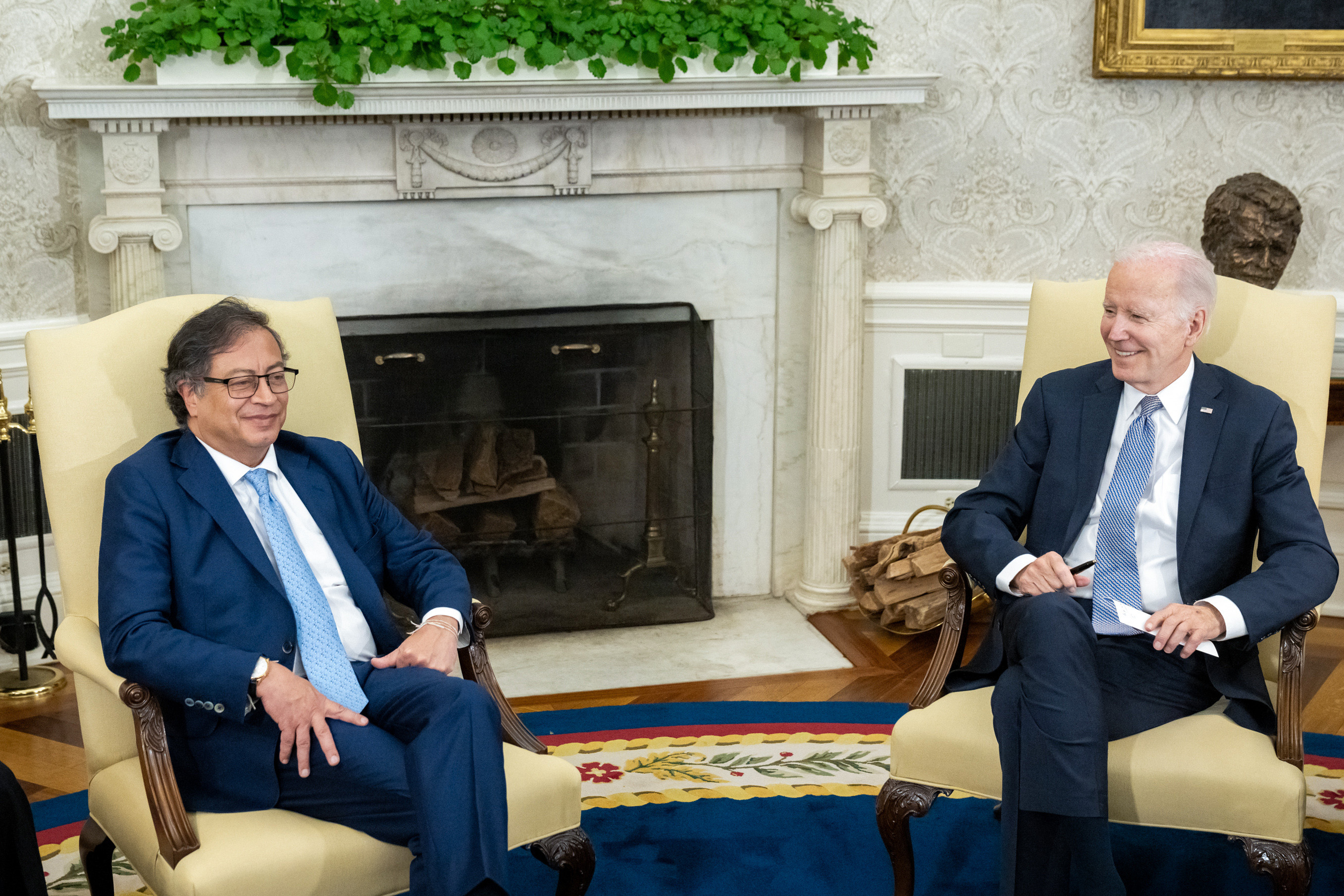
Petro with US President Joe Biden in April 2023

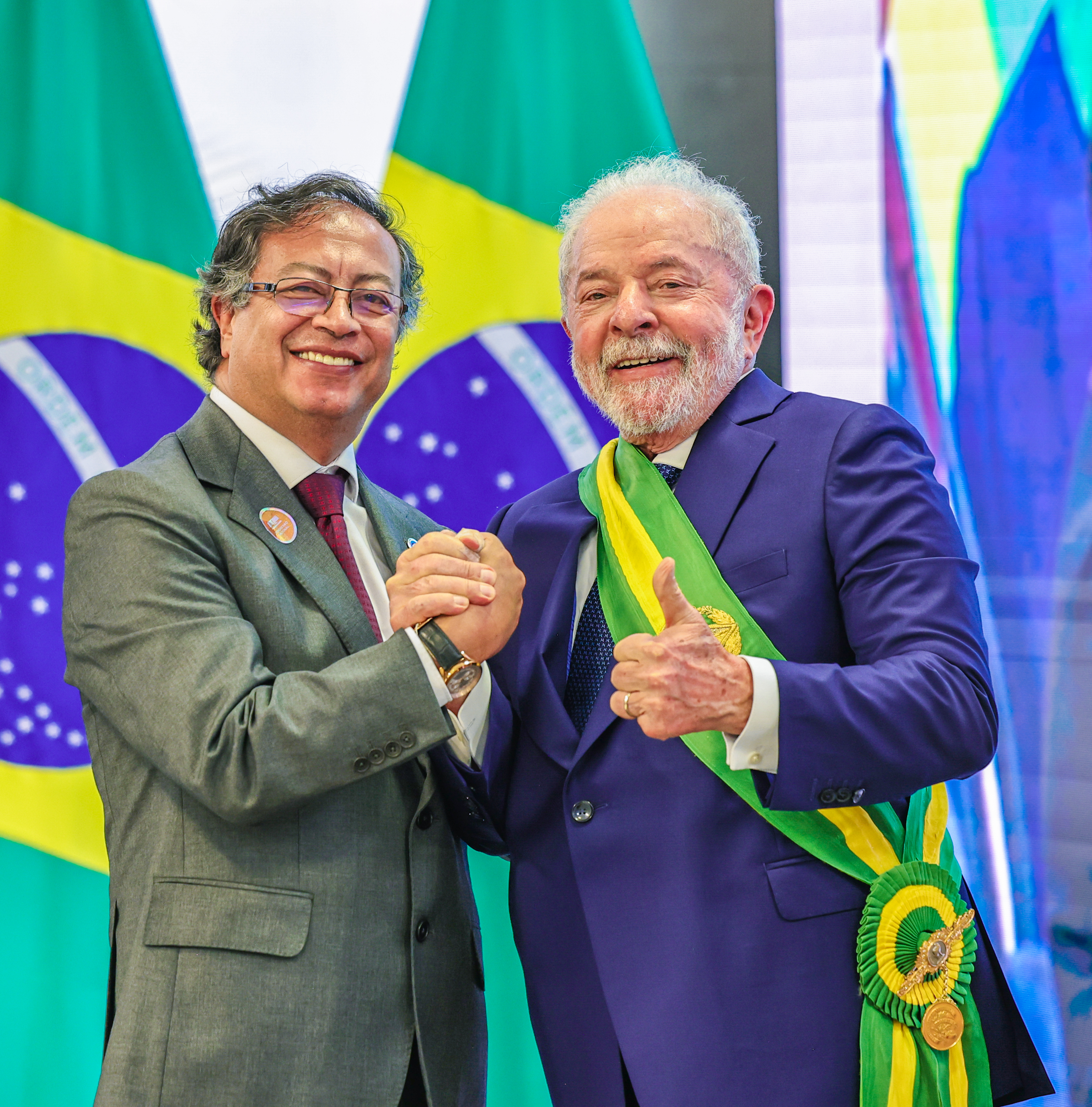
Petro with Brazilian President Luiz Inácio Lula da Silva in January 2023

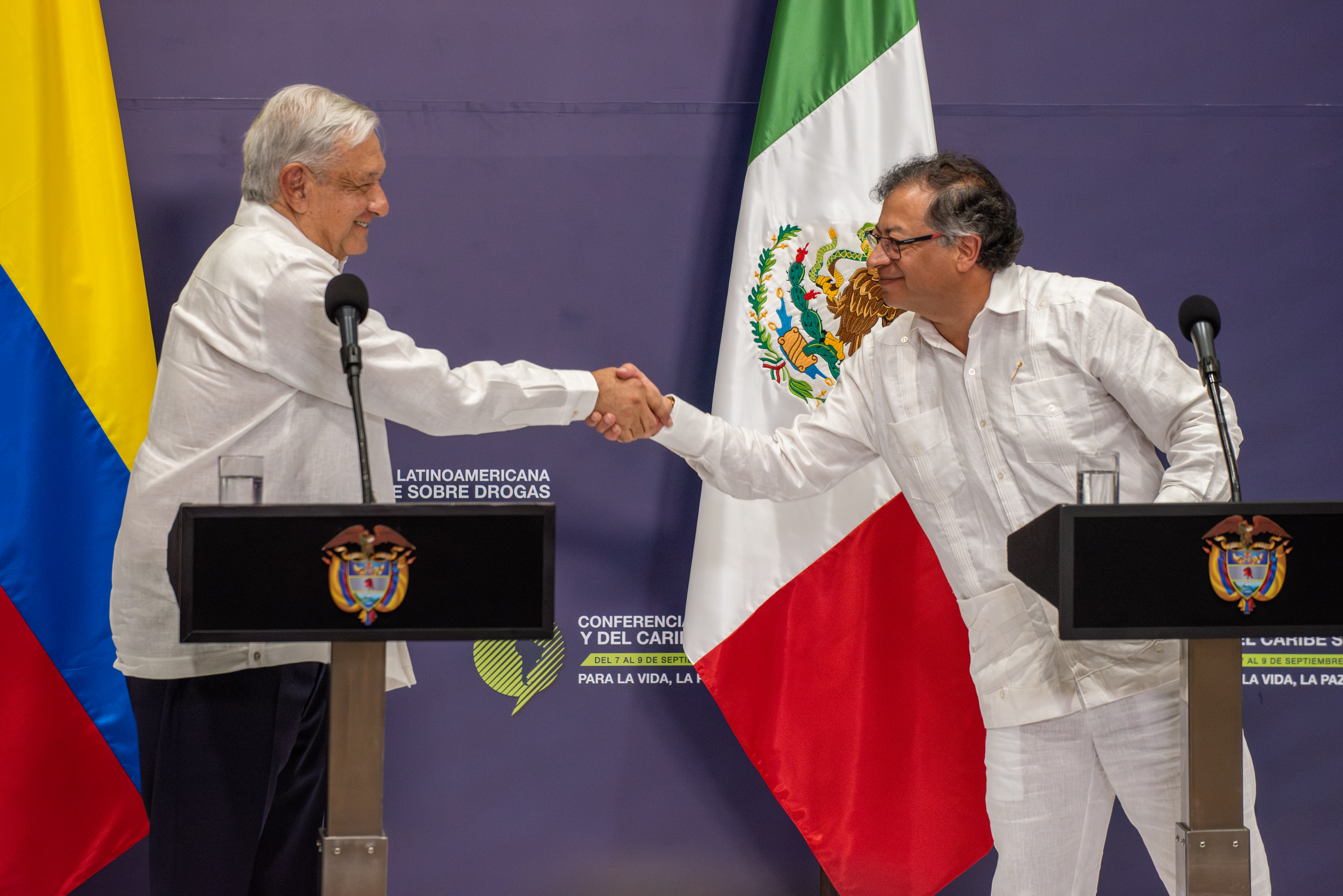
Petro with Mexican President Andrés Manuel López Obrador in September 2023

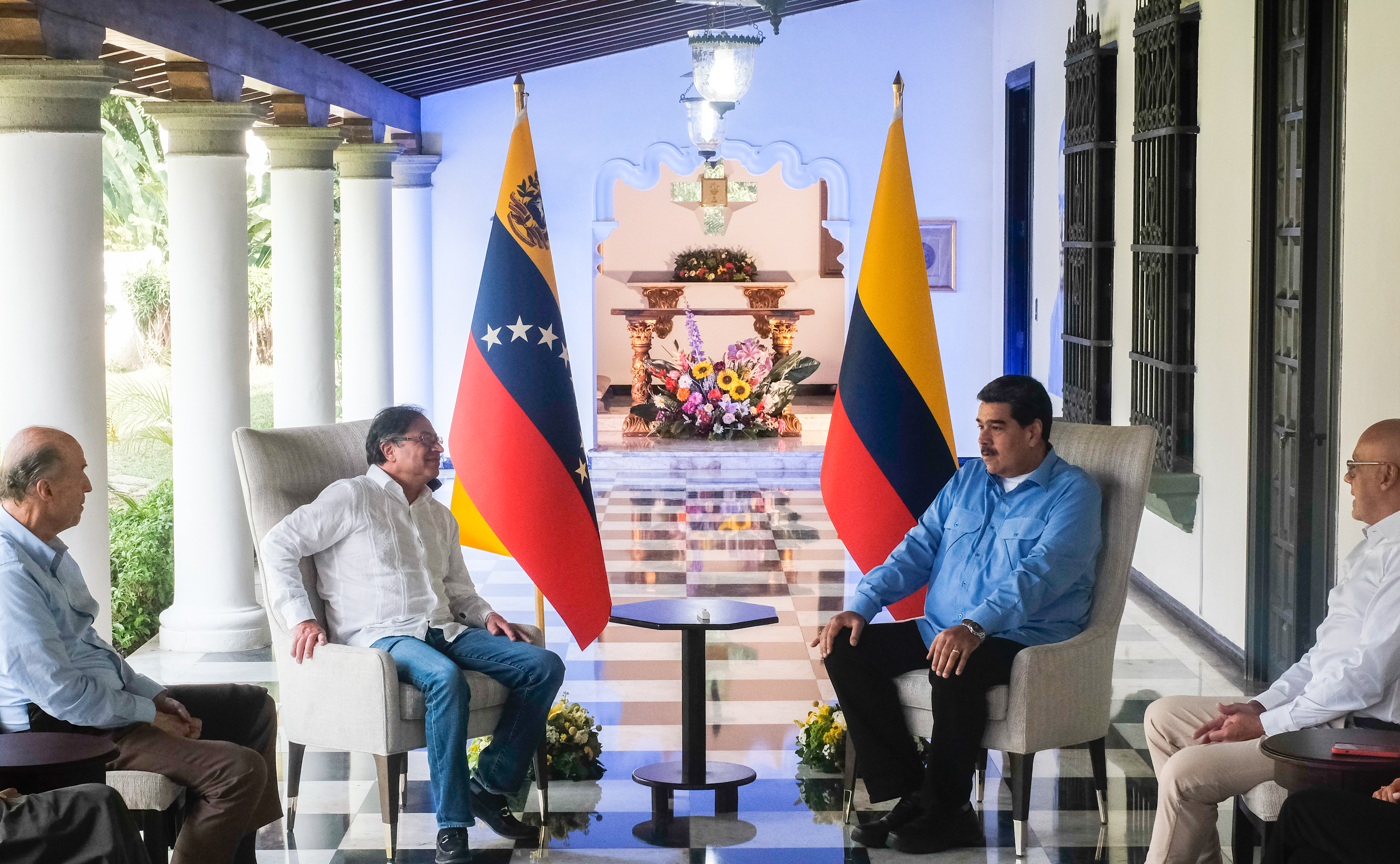
Official visit of Gustavo Petro to Caracas, meeting with the President of Venezuela Nicolás Maduro

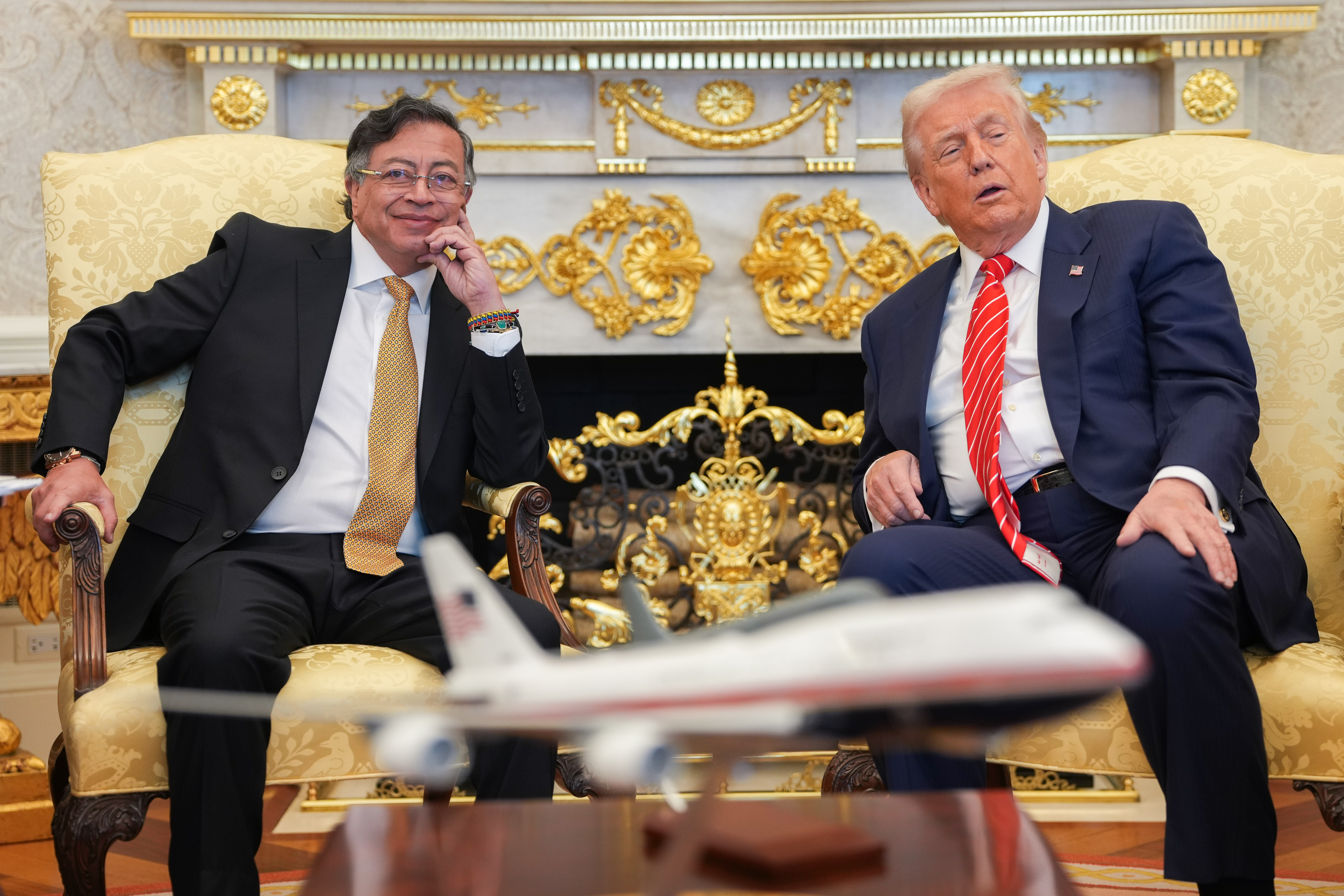
Petro with U.S. President Donald Trump in February 2026

As of 2019, before assuming the presidency, Petro had an ambiguous position on Venezuela under Hugo Chávez and Nicolás Maduro. While he has not denounced its alleged human rights violations or described Maduro as a dictator, unlike Iván Duque, he also has not expressed unrestricted support, unlike Evo Morales.

Petro had met Chávez in 1994, on Seventh Street in Bogotá, after inviting the latter to come to Colombia to learn more about the new Political Constitution of 1991. At the Bridge of Boyacá, both "swore an oath of Bolivarian integration for Latin America". After Chávez's death in 2013, Petro affirmed that he was a "great Latin American leader", saying: "You lived in Chávez's times and maybe you thought he was a clown. You were fooled. You lived in the times of a great Latin American leader". He also expressed: "Even if many do not like him, Hugo Chávez will be a man who will be remembered by the history of Latin America, his critics will be forgotten", "a friend and a hope is gone".

In 2016, Petro ironized about the crisis in Venezuela, in a year when shortages and malnutrition were rampant, by posting a photo of a supermarket with full shelves on Twitter and saying, "I went into a supermarket in Caracas and look what I found. Did RCN fool me?". In a 2018 interview in Al Punto, Mexican journalist Jorge Ramos asked Petro if he considered Chávez as a political leader, to which Petro answered that he believed that "he was popularly elected", but that authoritarianism in Venezuela under Maduro was putting an end to all freedoms.

In 2019, Petro criticized the idea of an American military intervention against Maduro's regime, stating that "only Venezuelans should solve Venezuela's problems", that "it's not a coup d'état backed by foreigners that will bring democracy to Venezuela", and that "what is happening in Venezuela is a frontal struggle for the control of oil". In 2020, Petro said that if Colombia reestablished diplomatic relations, cut off by Maduro, and sold food to Venezuela, Venezuelan immigration would cease.

In response to Maduro's attack of him and president of Chile Gabriel Boric as well as president of Peru Pedro Castillo, describing them as a "cowardly left wing" attacking the Bolivarian Revolution in February 2022, Petro responded on social media saying "I suggest Maduro to stop his insults. Cowards are those who do not embrace democracy", adding, "Get Venezuela out of oil, take it to the deepest democracy, if you must step aside, do it".

Following the results of the second round of the 2022 presidential elections in Colombia, Maduro congratulated Petro on his victory, saying "I congratulate Gustavo Petro and Francia Márquez, for the historic victory in the presidential elections in Colombia. The will of the Colombian people was heard, who came out to defend the path of democracy and peace. New times are on the horizon for this brother country".

In an August 2022 interview with the Colombian magazine Semana, Petro stated that he would only recognize Nicolás Maduro as Venezuelan president, and that the partially recognized interim president of Venezuela, Juan Guaidó, was a "non-existent" president, and that Guaidó had no control over the country. Guaidó reproached the lack of recognition of his interim government, and responded in a press conference: "I would have expected that his first decision would not have been to approach one who today shelters world terrorism in Venezuela".

On 28 September 2022, Colombia's ambassador to the Organization of American States, Luis Ernesto Vargas, declared that he would condemn human rights violations in Nicaragua when necessary, but that he would prioritize the integration of the countries in the region.

In October 2022, Petro claimed that the number of migrants returning to Venezuela at that time outnumbered those leaving the country, arguing that there were more Colombian migrants entering Venezuela than Venezuelans entering Colombia.

In May 2025, Petro granted asylum to former Panamanian president Ricardo Martinelli, who had been taking refuge in the Nicaraguan embassy in Panama City following a conviction for money laundering in 2023.

On 3 January 2026, Petro strongly condemned U.S. military strikes against Venezuela, describing them as an "assault on the sovereignty" of both Venezuela and Latin America. Petro ordered the immediate deployment of Colombian security forces to the Venezuelan border.

On August 1, 2026, Petro arrived in Cuba for his last foreign visit before his term ended next week.

==== Palestine ====
Petro condemned Israel's actions in the Gaza Strip during the Gaza war and accused Israel of committing genocide against the Palestinians. Petro expressed outrage after the 13 July 2024 al-Mawasi airstrikes, and he was one of the very first world leaders to condemn the Israeli blockade on Gaza immediately following the 7 October attacks.

Colombia formally supported South Africa's case against Israel at the International Court of Justice. In May 2024, Colombia suspended diplomatic relations with Israel. Subsequently, Colombia announced the opening of a diplomatic mission in Ramallah, headed by an ambassador to Palestine. In July 2025, Colombia was reported to have promoted an agreement with other nations to cease purchasing weapons from Israeli companies.

Petro's stance escalated significantly in September 2025 during the UN General Assembly. In his speech, he declared that diplomacy had failed and called for the formation of a "powerful army" from countries that "do not accept genocide" to "liberate Palestine". He argued that "words are no longer enough" and invoked the spirit of Simón Bolívar's "liberty or death". A few days later, at a pro-Palestinian rally in New York, he repeated this call and urged U.S. soldiers to "disobey the orders of Trump". In response, the U.S. State Department revoked his visa, calling his actions "reckless and incendiary". Petro condemned this decision, stating it "breaks all the norms of immunity" for UN attendees.

On 22 August 2026, Petro stated on Instagram that Esperiella's restoration of ties to Israel "applauds the Gaza genocide".

=== Social issues ===
Promoting progressive views and policies towards LGBTQ issues, he opened the Center for LGBTI Citizenship when he was Mayor of Bogotá. The opening of the Subdirectorate for LGBT Affairs had the purpose of restoring rights and eradicating discrimination. Several LGBTQ people held administrative positions.

He has supported an advance in the elimination of obstacles and stigmas to recognize the union of same-sex couples and their rights to adoption and social security. In addition to that, he affirmed that he will support and accompany with medical and psychosocial support the transition of gender with explicit protocols and with the participation of the trans population, and will promote a national program of safe cities free of violence and discrimination against women and people with sexual orientations, as well as diverse gender identities.

In the past, he received criticism from Francia Márquez, who was later the Historic Pact's vice presidential nominee. She denounced that Petro betrayed the agreement to include female leaders and Afro leaders on their lists to Congress. In response, and after a storm broke out, Petro asked that the men registered in the Senate move one seat from eleven to enable the space and comply with what she had said. Afro-Colombian communities were highlighted by the triumph of Gustavo Petro in the 2022 presidential election, where he swept the Pacific and Caribbean regions, both being places with the largest Afro-Colombian demographics.

Petro is a supporter of the feminist movement, with his government program including proposals such as the creation of the Ministry of Equality and a chapter dedicated to women.

Petro on the issue of abortion has been ambiguous. During 2020 and 2021, Petro has supported the idea of "zero abortion", but during an interview, he stated that "every society must prevent, with sexual education and technological measures so that abortion does not exist, I call that zero abortion. Abortion is not positive nor should it be encouraged, but that does not imply criminalizing women in that way, if you criminalize women you are not achieving a zero abortion society". Several supporters of the movement expressed their disagreement with Petro's statements, while some analysts, professors and politicians contradicted the proposals stating that a zero abortion society is "science fiction" and that Petro's statements are made to gather votes from members of the anti-abortion movement. In October 2021, Márquez said that Petro should "learn more about feminism". To placate the criticism that feminists made of him at the time, Petro published the photo of the Christmas gift that his daughter Sofía gave him: a book titled "Feminism for beginners".

On 22 February 2022, one day after the Colombian Constitutional Court decriminalized abortion, Petro said on Twitter: "I congratulate the women who waged the fight against the criminalization of abortion that criminalized them and killed them. Their victory is theirs. The empowerment of women that arises from here, sexual education and freedoms are the best way to protect life", and despite the fact that two weeks after the court's decision, he again mentioned the issue of "zero abortion", he has not mentioned it again nor does it appear in his government program.

In June 2022, Petro attended the Feminist Debate, a space convened by more than 30 social organizations of women, feminists and the LGBTIQ+ population, in order to present their proposals to the presidential candidates. Petro wore a green scarf throughout the event. Petro promised that he will enforce the constitutional ruling that decriminalized the interruption of pregnancy until the 24th week. He also said: "When a woman makes that free decision, it is not criminal (...) abortion is a woman's free decision and therefore there should be no social sanction".

With the issue of the land conflict in which indigenous people have been affected in the country, he invited on his the indigenous movement, the sugar cane agro-industrial sector (Asocaña) and the social movements of northern Cauca to initiate "the first regional dialogue of Colombia for Peace" to seek a "solution to the conflict over land".

In August 2022, Petro proposed decriminalizing the production of cocaine and marijuana, declaring "It is time for a new international convention that accepts that the war on drugs has failed."

In January 2023, Petro indicated that he wanted Colombia to move towards a preventive healthcare system in which disease is prevented as far as possible. Under the system the state would employ doctors to care for people who live in remote places and to care for poor farmers. Petro also said he would deliver a monthly bonus of about US$110 to almost three million recipients of the state's age based pension.

In June 2026, Petro commented on a newspaper column by Felipe Zuleta Lleras in El Espectador by posting the phrase “Heil Hitler” on social media. In the article Lleras wrote "Colombia does not need more rhetoric; it needs order, authority, and economic freedom".

=== Economic policy ===
In a speech given on 1 May 2024, Gustavo Petro proposed that private banks should be forced to invest in projects designated by the government, such as agriculture and the tourism industry.

The government of Gustavo Petro has implemented a series of economic and social reforms aimed at addressing Colombia’s structural inequalities. Key measures include a tax reform raising taxes on high incomes and dividends and reducing tax exemptions for certain economic sectors; a significant increase in the real minimum wage, substantially boosting labor income; and the reorganization of the social transfer system around the Renta Ciudadana program, designed to concentrate assistance on the poorest and most vulnerable households.

The rates of monetary poverty and extreme poverty declined significantly between 2022 and 2026, with approximately 2.2 million people rising out of poverty and nearly one million escaping extreme poverty. Unemployment has declined, reaching historically low levels, while informal employment has decreased. The fiscal deficit and public debt have increased.

== Personal life ==
=== Place of birth ===
During the 2022 presidential campaign, doubts arose about his true birthplace. Petro and his family state that he was born in Ciénaga de Oro, Córdoba. However, opponents associated with Uribism and former candidate Jorge Enrique Robledo circulated a video in which Petro said in a court hearing that he was born in Zipaquirá, Cundinamarca, and later released copies of private identity documents indicating Zipaquirá as his birthplace. Petro told several media outlets that he was indeed born in Ciénaga de Oro—his father’s hometown—but that his family moved to Bogotá when he was only a few months old, and he was raised there until age ten. He said the family later moved to Zipaquirá, where his mother registered him because his baptism record was in Ciénaga de Oro and the distance made travel difficult, requiring about 50 hours by bus at the time.

=== Family ===
In 1986, during his relationship with Katia Burgos, his eldest son, Nicolás, was born. The couple separated in 1992, after which he married politician and civic leader Mary Luz Herrán. They had two children, Andrea (b. 1991) and Andrés (b. 1992), and divorced in early 2000. In December 2000, he married law student Verónica Alcocer. They have three daughters: Sofía (b. 2002), Antonella (b. 2008), and Nicolás Alcocer (b. 1998), whom he later adopted as his own son.

In July 2023, Petro's eldest son Nicolás was arrested on money laundering charges.

=== Religion ===
In 2018, at a political meeting in Magangué about topics unrelated to religion (the forced displacement of peasants by paramilitary groups), Petro said: “In the end, if God exists, and hopefully he does, that has no forgiveness.” This led an internet portal to accuse him of being an atheist. Fact-checkers called such accusations false.

Asked about his beliefs, Petro said he has a Catholic upbringing because the school he attended was run by the Lasallians; this was where he encountered liberation theology, which he described as “a preferential option for the poor, from a very Christian view.” He also said that despite his Catholic formation, he does not attend Mass and is not a “prayer person,” because for him that is appearance, and what matters to him is “commitment.”

== Awards ==
- 2006: Best representative, by the Chamber of Representatives, and Character of the year, by the readers of the newspaper El Tiempo.
- 2007: Letelier-Moffitt Human Rights Award, by the Institute for Policy Studies (IPS).
- 2011: Luis Carlos Galán Sarmiento Medal, by the Senate of the Republic and Chamber of Representatives Ethics Committees.
- 2013: Defenzoor of the year, by Defenzoores Association, and City Climate Leadership Award, by C40 and Siemens.
- 2018: Honorary Professor, by the National University of Lanús.
- 2022: Grand Collar of the Order of Boyacá, Collar of the Order of San Carlos, Grand Cross Extraordinary of the National Order of Merit and Order of Merit Colonel Guillermo Fergusson, by president Iván Duque.
- 2023: Grand Collar of the Order of Isabella the Catholic, Doctor Honoris Causa, by the University for Peace.
- 2024: Grand Collar of the Order of the State of Palestine, Mahmoud Abbas.

== Notes ==
Party political offices
| Preceded by Carlos Gaviria | Alternative Democratic Pole nominee for President of Colombia; 2010 | Succeeded by Clara López |
| New political party | Humane Colombia nominee for President of Colombia; 2018, 2022 | Most recent |
| New political alliance | Historic Pact nominee for President of Colombia; 2022 | Most recent |
Political offices
| Preceded by Clara López as Acting Mayor | Mayor of Bogotá; 2012–2014 | Succeeded by Rafael Pardo Rueda as Acting Mayor |
| Preceded by María Mercedes Maldonado as Acting Mayor | Mayor of Bogotá; 2014–2015 | Succeeded by Enrique Peñalosa |
| Preceded by Iván Duque | President of Colombia; 2022–2026 | Succeeded by Abelardo de la Espriella |
