= Sara Bright =

Colombian filmmaker

- Born: 1952; London

Sara Bright (1952 – ) is a Colombian filmmaker and co-founder of the feminist film collective Cine Mujer.

Sara Bright was born in 1952 in London. She graduated from the Lycée français Louis Pasteur in Bogotá in 1970. She attended the Harrow School of Art and Technology in London, graduating in 1974. After working for BBC Radio, she returned to Colombia to direct television commercials.

Bright and Eulalia Carrizosa met in 1975 and collaborated on a narrated slide show about abortion, La realidad del aborto (1976) and a film, A primera vista (1978). They founded Cine Mujer in 1978, eventually joined by Rita Escobar, Patricia Restrepo, Dora Ramirez, Clara Riascos, and Fanny Tobon. Cine Mujer collectively produced 38 films, mostly short documentary films about women's issues. Bright left Cine Mujer in 1989 but continued to make films. Cine Mujer ceased operations in 1999.

== Filmography ==
- 1976: La realidad del aborto (The Reality of Abortion, slide show with narration). with Eulalia Carrizosa.
- 1978: A primera vista (At First Glance, 35mm film, 10 min.) with Eulalia Carrizosa.
- 1984: Buscando caminos (Finding Ways, 3/4-inch video, 20 min.).
- 1985: Campesina (Peasant Woman, 3/4-inch video, 15 min.).
- 1985: La mujer se organiza (Woman Organizes, 3/4-inch video, 13 min.).
- 1985: Politicas de desarrollo para la mujer campesina (Developmental Policies for Peasant Women, 3/4-inch video, 10 min.).
- 1987: La matriz (3/4-inch video, 10 min.).
- 1988: Calidad (Quality, 3/4-inch video, 25 min.).
- 1988: Lucero (Firefly, 3/4-inch video, 25 min.).
