= 2023 Amazon Cooperation Treaty Organization Summit =

South American multinational summit

The 2023 Amazon Cooperation Treaty Organization Summit, also known as the 2023 Amazon countries summit or the 2023 Amazon Summit, was a multilateral event which took place from 8 to 9, August 2023 in the Brazilian city of Belém. Member countries of the Amazon Cooperation Treaty Organization (ACTO), whose headquarters are in Brazil, attended the summit to discuss regional cooperation in the Amazon basin regarding environment, security, economy and development, among other topics.

Companies, civic associations including indigenous ones, non-governmental organizations and non-ACTO member countries were invited by host Brazil to take part in the discussions.

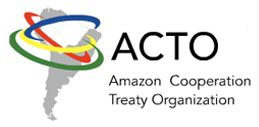
Logo of Amazon Cooperation Treaty Organization (ACTO).

== Background ==
The last such summit had been in 2009 during the first presidency of Lula da Silva. Following years of international isolation in environmental matters under the presidency of Jair Bolsonaro during which environment policies were either loosened or scrapped, and disasters such as the 2019 Northeast Brazil oil spill and the Yanomami humanitarian crisis took place, Brazil sought to restore and update its environmental standards alongside regional and international partners from the beginning of the second presidency of Lula da Silva.

Regionally, the summit is pointed out by policymakers and movements as an important forum to discuss illegal deforestation and underling issues affecting the Amazon, such illegal migration, human trafficking, drugs trafficking, precious metals smuggling, wildlife trafficking, oil drilling and others. Governments and organizations also see the summit as an opportunity for developing countries to share their technologies and to unify and mutually support their strategies for climate justice in the international context, ahead of the COP28 and other negotiations.

== Attendees ==
The ACTO member states are Bolivia, Brazil, Colombia, Ecuador, Guyana, Peru, Suriname, and Venezuela. Their leaders were all invited to attend the summit. Five countries sent their Head of State, the exceptions being Ecuador, Suriname and Venezuela (the latter being represented by the Vice-President Delcy Rodríguez).

Democratic Republic of Congo, Republic of Congo and Indonesia, which host the Congo basin and the Borneo and Sumatra rainforests respectively, were invited. France, due to the location of its French Guiana overseas department in the Amazon, was also invited as were the Amazon Fund donors Norway and Germany. International organizations, including FAO, CELAC, UNDP and the NDB, were likewise invited to participate.

== Outcomes ==
- The eight Amazon nations failed to agree on a common goal for ending deforestation.
- Brazil has announced its plan to eliminate deforestation by 2030.
- Bolivia and Venezuela are the only Amazon countries not to sign onto a 2021 anti-deforestation agreement.
