= Nicolás Petro =

Colombian politician (born 1986)

Member of the Departmental Assembly of Atlántico
- In office January 1, 2019 – August 8, 2023

Personal details
- Born: Nicolás Fernando Petro Burgos; June 21, 1986 (age 40) Ciénaga de Oro, Córdoba, Colombia
- Party: Independent (2023-present)
- Other political affiliations: Humane Colombia (2011-2023); Historic Pact for Colombia (2021-2023)
- Spouses: Daysuris Vásquez (m. 2019; div. 2026); Laura Ojeda (m. 2026)
- Children: 1
- Parents: Gustavo Petro (father); Katia Burgos (mother)
- Relatives: Petro family
- Education: Pontifical Bolivarian University (LLB); Pompeu Fabra University (MPA)

Nicolás Fernando Petro Burgos (born June 21, 1986) is a Colombian politician and lawyer who served as a Departamental Deputy of Atlántico from 2020 to 2023. A member of the Petro family and the Humane Colombia Party, he is the eldest son of the 35th Colombian president, Gustavo Petro, and Katia Burgos.

After graduating with a law degree from the Pontifical Bolivarian University, Petro entered politics, obtaining the nomination for Governor of Atlántico in the 2024 election.

== Early life, family and education ==
Nicolás Fernando Petro Burgos was born in Ciénaga de Oro, Córdoba, on June 21, 1986, the eldest son of Gustavo Petro and his partner, Katia Burgos. He grew up with his grandparents and his mother in Cajicá, Cundinamarca, while his father was imprisoned. He studied law at the Pontifical Bolivarian University and later earned a master's degree in Government and Public Management for Latin America at Pompeu Fabra University in Barcelona, Spain.

Petro married Daysuris Vásquez in 2019 and later held a Catholic ceremony in 2022. The couple divorced in 2023, after Nicolás' infidelity with Laura Ojeda, his partner since 2023 with whom he has a son.

=== Money laundering scandal ===
In July 2023, Petro was publicly accused by his ex-wife, Daysuris Vásquez, who, in an interview with the magazine Semana, claimed that he had received illegal money, which they described as "black money," from individuals with past ties to drug trafficking. Vásquez asserted that she requested the money, stating it was for Gustavo Petro 2022 presidential campaign, but that Nicolás ultimately kept the funds and already had plans for them.

Subsequently, the Office of the Attorney General of Colombia opened a disciplinary investigation against Nicolás for alleged money laundering. On July 29, 2023, Petro and Vásquez were arrested on charges of money laundering and illicit enrichment. President Gustavo Petro had requested the investigation of his son, which began in March 2023. On August 1, 2023, Petro pleaded not guilty to the charges. which commenced in March 2023. After agreeing to cooperate with investigators, he was released to house arrest that same week. On August 1, 2023, Petro pled not guilty to the charges.
