= Lycée français Louis Pasteur (Colombia) =

French international school in Bogota, Colombia

Coordinates: 4.6677°N 74.0468°W

- Spanish: Liceo Francés Louis Pasteur
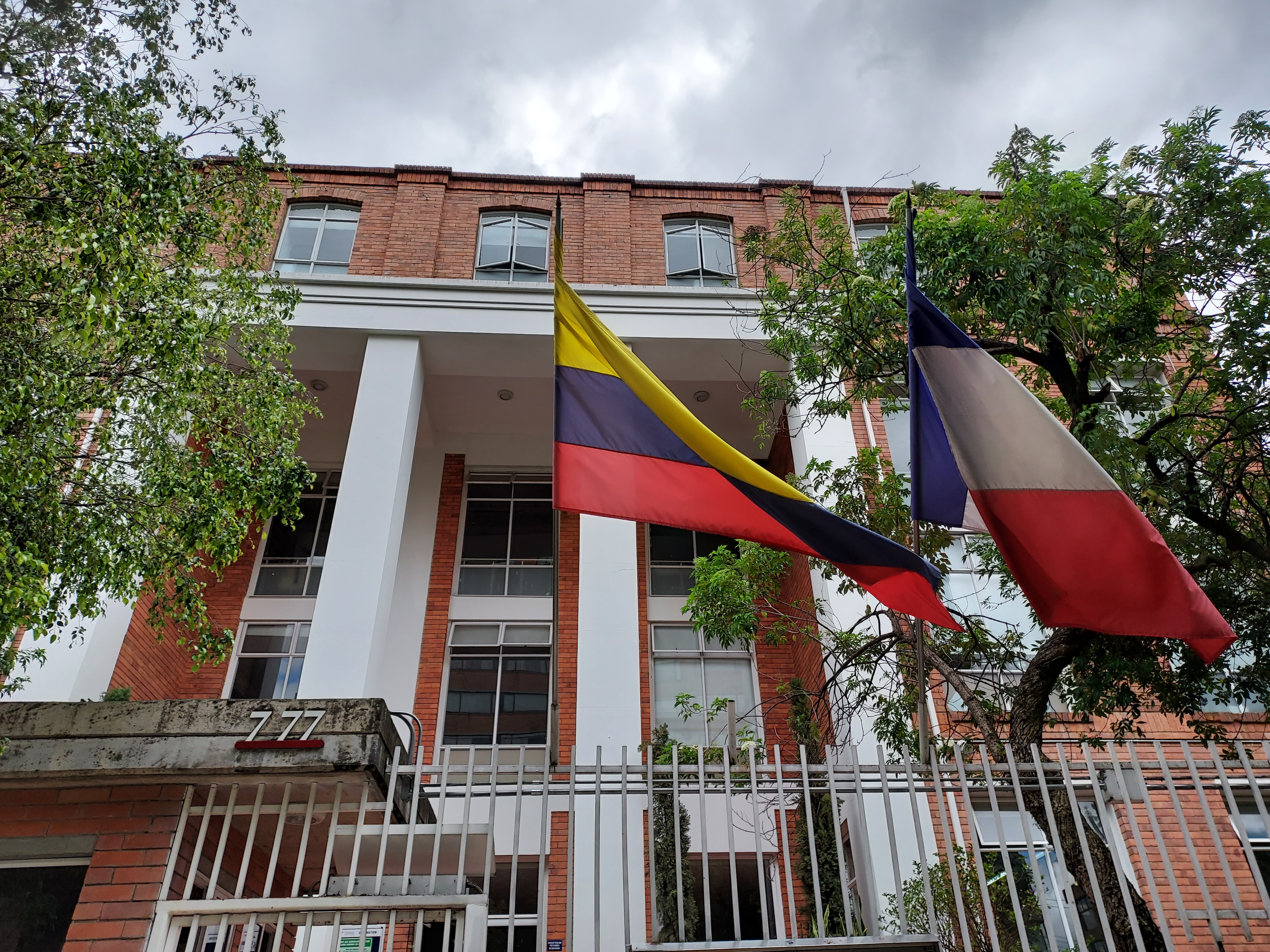
- Entrance to the Lycée français on Calle 87
- Bogotá; Colombia

Information
- School type: International School
- Established: 1934; 92 years ago
- Language: French

The Lycée français Louis Pasteur (Spanish: Liceo Francés Louis Pasteur) is a French international school in Bogotá, Colombia. It serves the levels maternelle until lycée (senior high school).

== History ==
The school officially opened on 15 February 1934. It initially had 35 students and had been established by francophile José de la Vega, along with some of his friends. It moved to a larger campus in 1936 and took its current name in 1943. The school bought additional land in 1947 so it could expand. It had 1,000 students in 1961, and this increased to 1,850 in 1972. Its preschool/nursery opened in 1972. In the summer of 2002 the courtyard received renovations, and in 2003 a new gymnasium opened.

== Student body ==
As of 2015 the school had 1,980 students from 37 countries, with 64.4% of the students being Colombian and 30% of the students being French or binational. There were 1,058 primary school students and 915 secondary school students.

Around that time the trend included an increase in French/binational students and a decrease in Colombian students. In 2007 students came from 21 countries, and 72.5% of the students were Colombian. In 2008 the school had 1,766 students. In September 2013 the school had 1,936 students from 29 countries; that year 69% of the students were Colombian and 26% of the students were French/binational.

== Former students ==
- Beatriz de la Vega (1939)
- Alberto Miani Uribe (1967)
- Rogelio Salmona
- Antanas Mockus (1969), Mayor of Bogotá
- Íngrid Betancourt (1979), Senator of Colombia
- Carlos Lleras de la Fuente
- Germán Vargas Lleras, Vice President of Colombia
- German Rodiguez (1986)
- Martin von Hildebrand (1963)
- Sergio Tovar (1987)
- Karen Paulina Biswell (2001)
- Juan Arbeláez ("sixième", 2001), chef in Paris, France
- Sara Bright (1970)
