= Ciénaga de Oro =

- Municipality and town
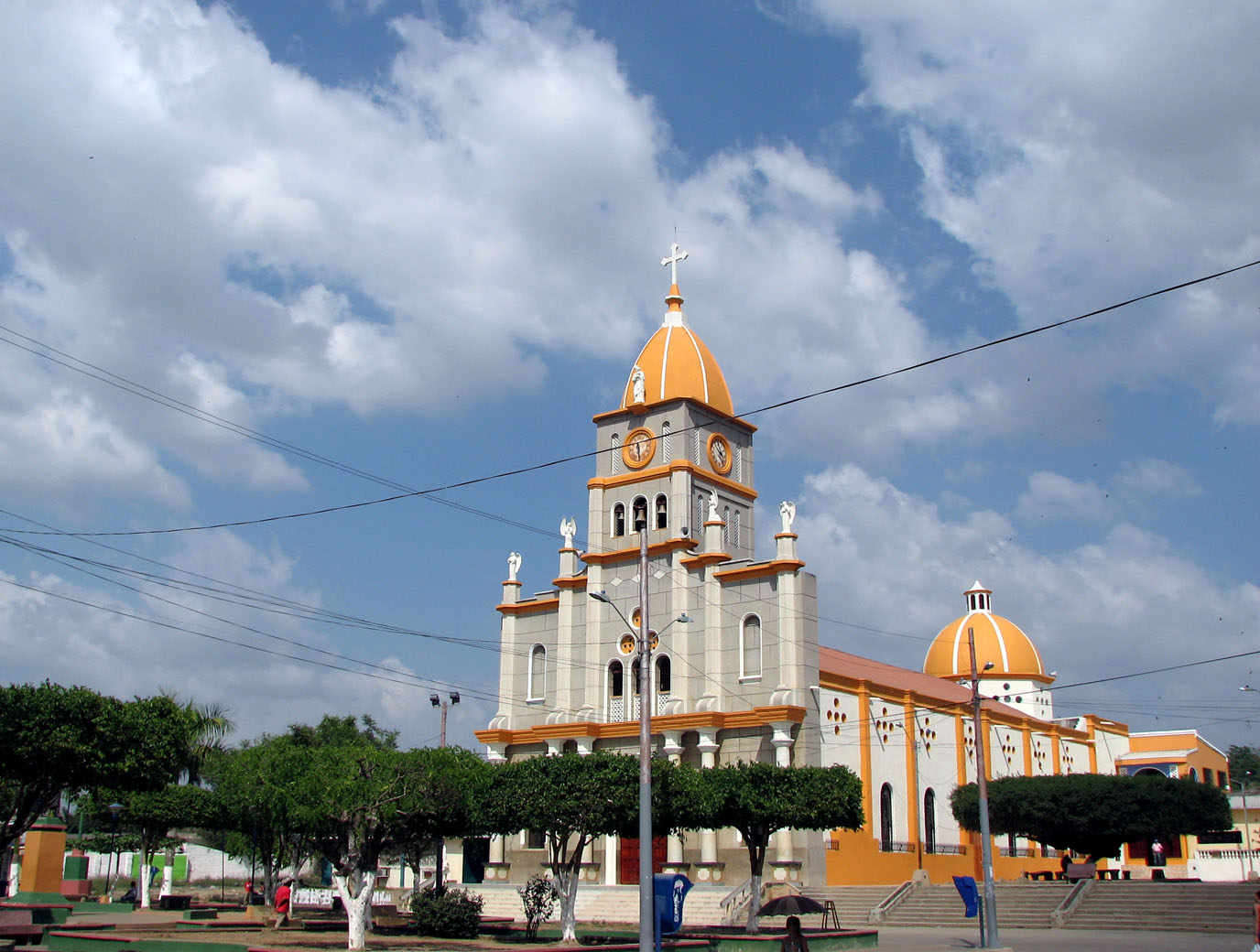
- View of the Downtown's Plaza

- Flag Coat of arms

- Location in the Department of Cordoba.
- Coordinates: 8°53′N 75°37′W
- Country: Colombia
- Region: Caribbean
- Department: Cordoba
- Foundation: December 15, 1776

Government
  - Mayor: Valentina Otero Burgos

Area
  - Municipality and town: 641.2 km^{2} (247.6 sq mi)
  - Urban: 3.19 km^{2} (1.23 sq mi)
- Elevation: 13 m (43 ft)

Population (2020 est.)
  - Municipality and town: 60,521
  - Density: 94.39/km^{2} (244.5/sq mi)
  - Urban: 22,365
  - Urban density: 7,010/km^{2} (18,200/sq mi)
- Time zone: UTC-5
- Website: cienagadeoro.gov.co

Ciénaga de Oro (Spanish pronunciation: [ˈsjenaɣa ðe oɾo]) meaning "Golden Marsh", is a town and municipality located in the Córdoba Department, northern Colombia.

According to 2020 estimates, the population of Ciénaga de Oro was 60,521, with a population density of 94 persons per square kilometer.

Ciénaga de Oro is the birthplace of Colombian president Gustavo Petro.

== Climate ==
Climate data for Ciénaga de Oro (Salado El), elevation 40 m (130 ft), (1981–2010)
Month	Jan	Feb	Mar	Apr	May	Jun	Jul	Aug	Sep	Oct	Nov	Dec	Year
Mean daily maximum °C (°F)	34.5 (94.1)	34.9 (94.8)	34.9 (94.8)	34.4 (93.9)	32.9 (91.2)	32.8 (91.0)	33.1 (91.6)	32.9 (91.2)	32.6 (90.7)	32.6 (90.7)	32.9 (91.2)	33.6 (92.5)	33.5 (92.3)
Daily mean °C (°F)	28.0 (82.4)	28.3 (82.9)	28.4 (83.1)	28.4 (83.1)	28.0 (82.4)	27.9 (82.2)	27.9 (82.2)	27.8 (82.0)	27.6 (81.7)	27.5 (81.5)	27.8 (82.0)	27.9 (82.2)	28.0 (82.4)
Mean daily minimum °C (°F)	23.1 (73.6)	23.4 (74.1)	24.0 (75.2)	24.4 (75.9)	24.2 (75.6)	23.8 (74.8)	23.6 (74.5)	23.5 (74.3)	23.4 (74.1)	23.5 (74.3)	23.6 (74.5)	23.4 (74.1)	23.6 (74.5)
Average precipitation mm (inches)	16.4 (0.65)	21.6 (0.85)	27.0 (1.06)	109.2 (4.30)	188.8 (7.43)	154.7 (6.09)	167.5 (6.59)	191.6 (7.54)	192.6 (7.58)	149.3 (5.88)	107.6 (4.24)	43.7 (1.72)	1,369.9 (53.93)
Average precipitation days	3	4	5	11	16	15	15	16	16	15	11	5	130
Average relative humidity (%)	84	82	81	81	85	86	85	85	86	86	86	85	84
Source: Instituto de Hidrologia Meteorologia y Estudios Ambientales
