= Embassy of the Philippines, Bogotá =

Diplomatic mission of the Philippines in Colombia

Embassy of the Philippines, Bogotá Pasuguan ng Pilipinas sa Bogota Embajada de Filipinas en Bogotá
- Location: Bogotá
- Address: Calle 76, No. 11-17/35, Chapinero
- Coordinates: 4°39′39.6″N 74°3′23.6″W
- Ambassador: Adrian Bernie C. Candolada
- Website: bogotape.org

The Embassy of the Philippines in Bogotá is the diplomatic mission of the Republic of the Philippines to the Republic of Colombia. Opened in 2024, it is currently located in the barrio (neighborhood) of La Porciúncula, part of the locality of Chapinero in northern Bogotá, across from the campus of the Gimnasio Moderno.

== History ==
Although the Philippines and Colombia established diplomatic relations in 1946, and Colombia opened a resident mission in Manila in 2017, relations between the two countries have historically been conducted through missions in other countries, with Colombia most recently being under the jurisdiction of the Philippine Embassy in Brasília.

The Philippines began to consider opening a resident mission in Colombia in late 2018, shortly after the opening of the Colombian Embassy in Manila. On February 18, 2019, during the opening of the new chancery of the Philippine Embassy in Berlin, Secretary Teodoro Locsin Jr. of the Department of Foreign Affairs (DFA) announced that an embassy in Colombia was one of the missions the DFA was planning to open within the next five years, a possibility that Colombian Ambassador to the Philippines Víctor Echiverri hinted to shortly afterward.

In 2023, the Colombian Embassy in Manila announced during a meeting with the Colombian community in the Philippines that a Philippine embassy was set to open the following year, and during the sixth bilateral consultation meeting between the two countries on August 14, 2024, the DFA confirmed that a team had already been sent to Bogotá to prepare for the mission's opening. At the meeting, Foreign Affairs Undersecretary Ma. Theresa P. Lazaro remarked that the embassy's opening is a "clear signal of the Philippines’ commitment to enhance relations with Latin America", becoming the second Southeast Asian country after Indonesia to have a resident diplomatic mission in Colombia.

The advance team setting up the embassy announced that they had arrived in Bogotá on August 25, 2024, preparing to immediately begin offering consular services once the mission has completed all the required procedures for opening. It fully opened for consular services on October 7, 2024, with the first Filipino visitors being received a week later.

== Chancery ==
The chancery of the Philippine Embassy in Bogotá was initially located in a room of the NH Collection Bogotá, an NH Hotel Group-affiliated hotel attached to the World Trade Center Bogotá on Calle 100 and Carrera 8 in El Chicó, a neighborhood at the northern end of Chapinero. It secured a temporary office space shortly thereafter at La Noventa, an office building located further south in the same neighborhood at the corner of Calle 90 and Carrera 11.

On October 27, 2024, the embassy began the process of looking for a permanent chancery, and on January 13, 2025 it announced that the chancery had relocated to the eighth floor of the Torre Los Nogales in La Porciúncula, closer to the center of Chapinero. The new chancery was formally inaugurated on December 4, 2025, with an official from the Colombian Ministry of Foreign Affairs and members of the local Filipino community in attendance.

== Staff and activities ==
The Philippine Embassy in Bogotá is headed by Ambassador Adrian Bernie C. Candolada, who was appointed to the position by President Bongbong Marcos on June 25, 2024. Prior to his appointment as ambassador, Candolada, a career diplomat, served as Consul General at the Philippine Embassy in Singapore, where he was also the mission's second-in-command. After his appointment was confirmed by the Commission on Appointments on August 7, 2024, he was accredited as ambassador on January 23, 2025, and subsequently presented his credentials to Colombian President Gustavo Petro on April 2, 2025.

Aside from Colombia, the embassy has been designated to exercise jurisdiction over Ecuador and Venezuela.

== See also ==
- Colombia–Philippines relations
- List of diplomatic missions of the Philippines
