= List of botanical gardens in Colombia =

Botanical gardens in Colombia have collections consisting entirely of Colombia native and endemic species; most have a collection that include plants from around the world. There are botanical gardens and arboreta in all states and territories of Colombia, most are administered by local governments, some are privately owned.

- Red Nacional de Jardines Botánicos de Colombia
- Jardín Botánico de Cartagena
- Jardín Botánico del Pacífico, Chocó
- Jardín Botánico del Quindio
- Bogotá Botanical Garden
- Fundación Jardín Etnobotánico Villa Ludovica
- Jardín Botánico de Cali
- Jardín Botánico de Medellín
- Jardín Botánico de Barranquilla
- Jardín Botánico de San Andrés
