= Rosales, Bogotá =

Rosales
- Neighborhood
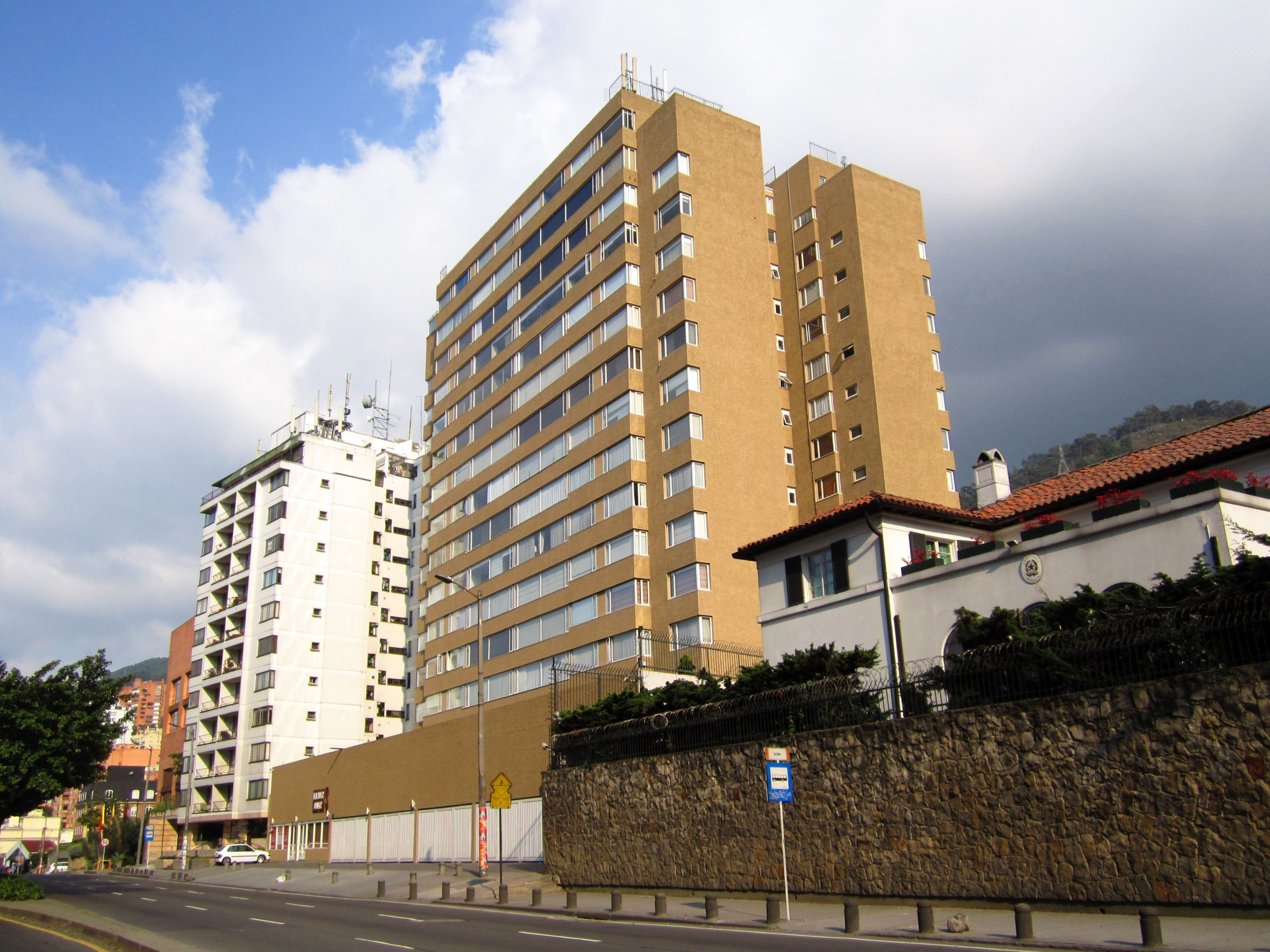
- Buildings in Rosales along Carrera Séptima

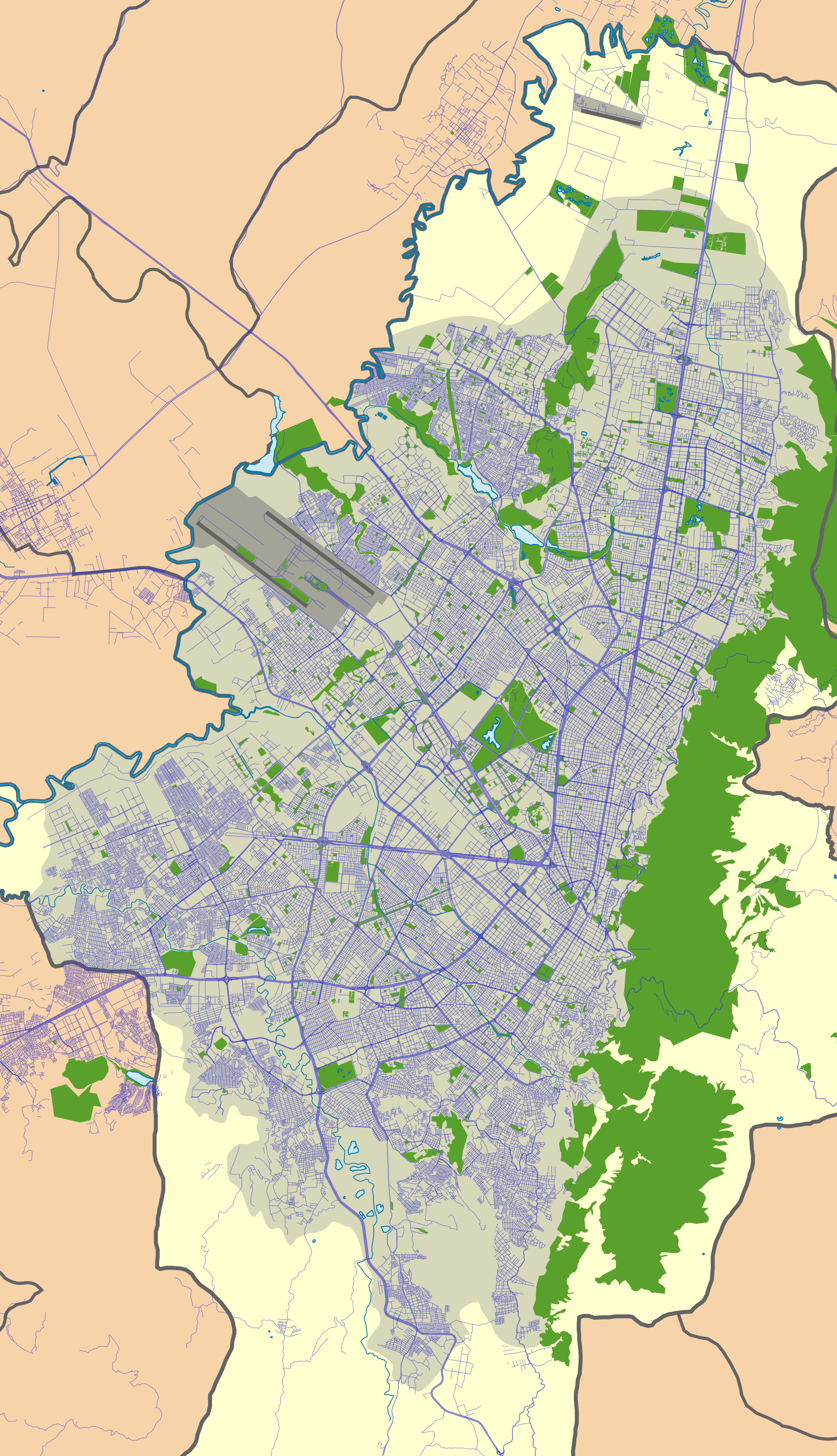
- Location in Bogotá
- Coordinates: 4°39′36.5″N 74°02′54.1″W
- Country: Colombia
- Department: Distrito Capital
- City: Bogotá
- Locality: Chapinero
- Elevation: 2,623 m (8,606 ft)
- Time zone: UTC-5 (Colombia Time (COT))

Rosales is a neighborhood in the Chapinero locality of Bogotá.

== Limits ==
- North: Calle 82
- South: Calle 72
- West: Eastern Hills
- East: Carrera Séptima

== Economy and culture ==
Rosales is a wealthy neighborhood of Bogotá, Colombia. The neighborhood is known for brick high rises which are found from Carrera Séptima (7th Avenue) to Avenida Circunvalar.

The neighborhood was home to many affluent large homes until the late 1970s when families began selling their estates to make a large sum on multi-family dwellings. The large red-brick high rises offered high class Bogotanos better security and residences that were easier to maintain.

Rosales is home to many embassies as it has easy access to both the North and Downtown Bogotá due to its proximity to Carrera Séptima and La Circunvalar. Other assets of Rosales are the numerous parks and creeks that flow down from the Andean mountains.

=== Points of interest ===
There are several parks which have natural streams sourced from the mountains, such as Quebradas de Rosales and Alameda de Quebrada Vieja, both of which are frequently used for leisure activities.

=== Transportation ===
Carrera Séptima and the Avenida Chile provide access to public transport. Other important streets are Carreras Quinta, Cuarta and Avenida Circunvalar.
