= Bogotá Botanical Garden =

Botanical garden in Bogotá, Colombia

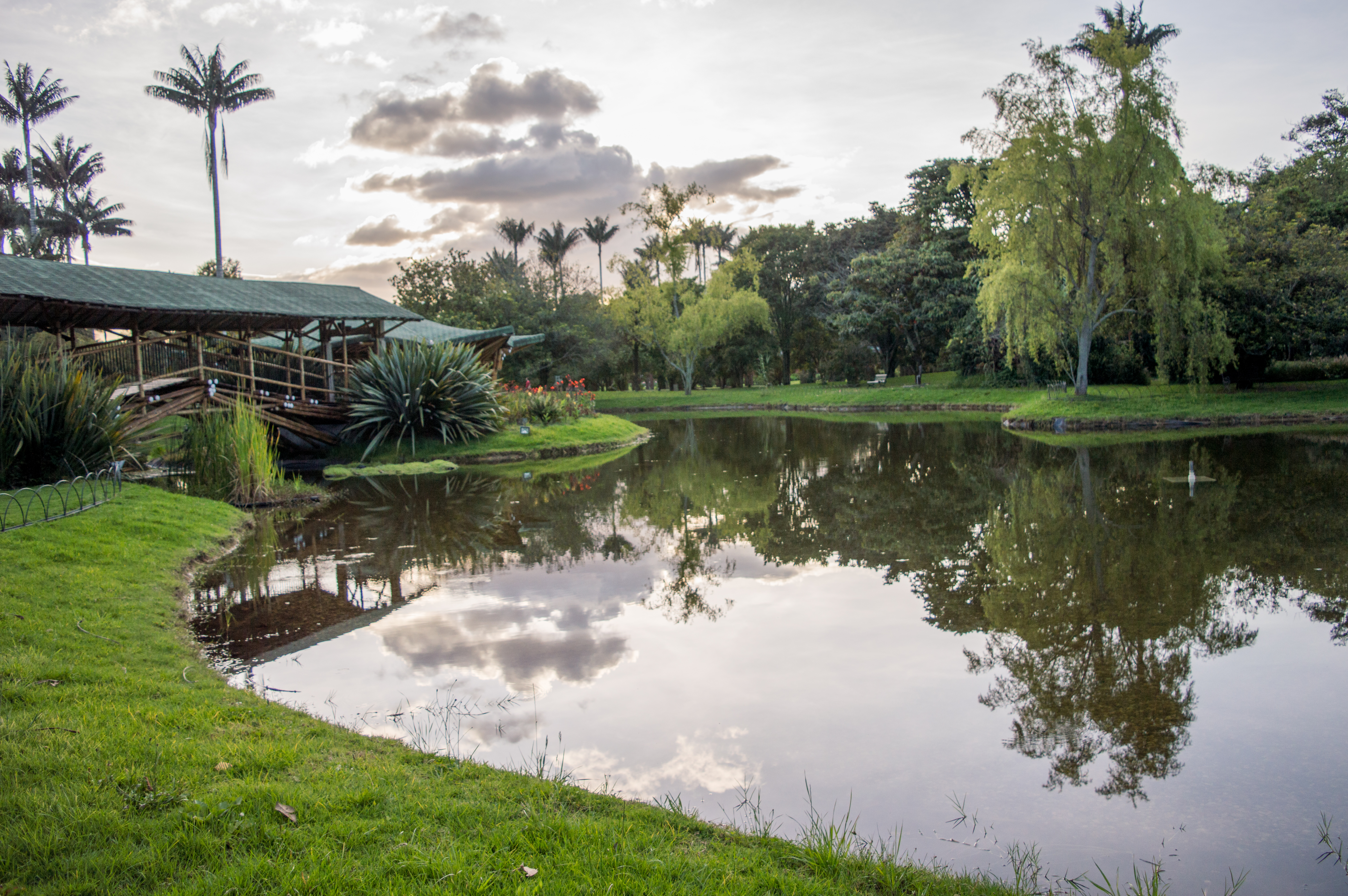
Botanical Garden of Bogotá José Celestino Mutis
Type	Public
Location	Bogotá, Colombia
Coordinates	4.66788°N 74.099779°W
Size	19,5 ha
Opened	1955
Administered by	City of Bogotá
Visitors	600 daily
Schedule	Monday to Friday: 8:00am to 5:00pm Weekend and holidays:9:00 to 5:00pm
Average temperature	18 °C
Altitude	2.551 msnm
Average rainfall	713 mm
Topography	Plateau
Website	www.jbb.gov.co

The José Celestino Mutis botanical garden is Colombia's biggest botanical garden. It serves both as a recreation and research center with an emphasis on Andean and Páramo ecosystems. The garden is located in Bogotá and features plants from every Colombian altitude, climate and region. It was founded in 1955, in honor of botanist and astronomer José Celestino Mutis.

The municipally owned park is famous nationwide and is a member of the internationally known BGCI (Botanic Gardens Conservation International). The garden has an artificial waterfall and labs for studying plants and flowers. It also has public services such as a library and a tourist information desk. The garden is the only one in the nation specialized in preserving and collecting Andean species of flowers. Its 19.5 acres are full with collections of plants grouped by their original ecosystem.

Among other curiosities, the park includes a sun clock, a palmetum, an orchid collection, and a wide variety of Amazon flowers.

== History ==
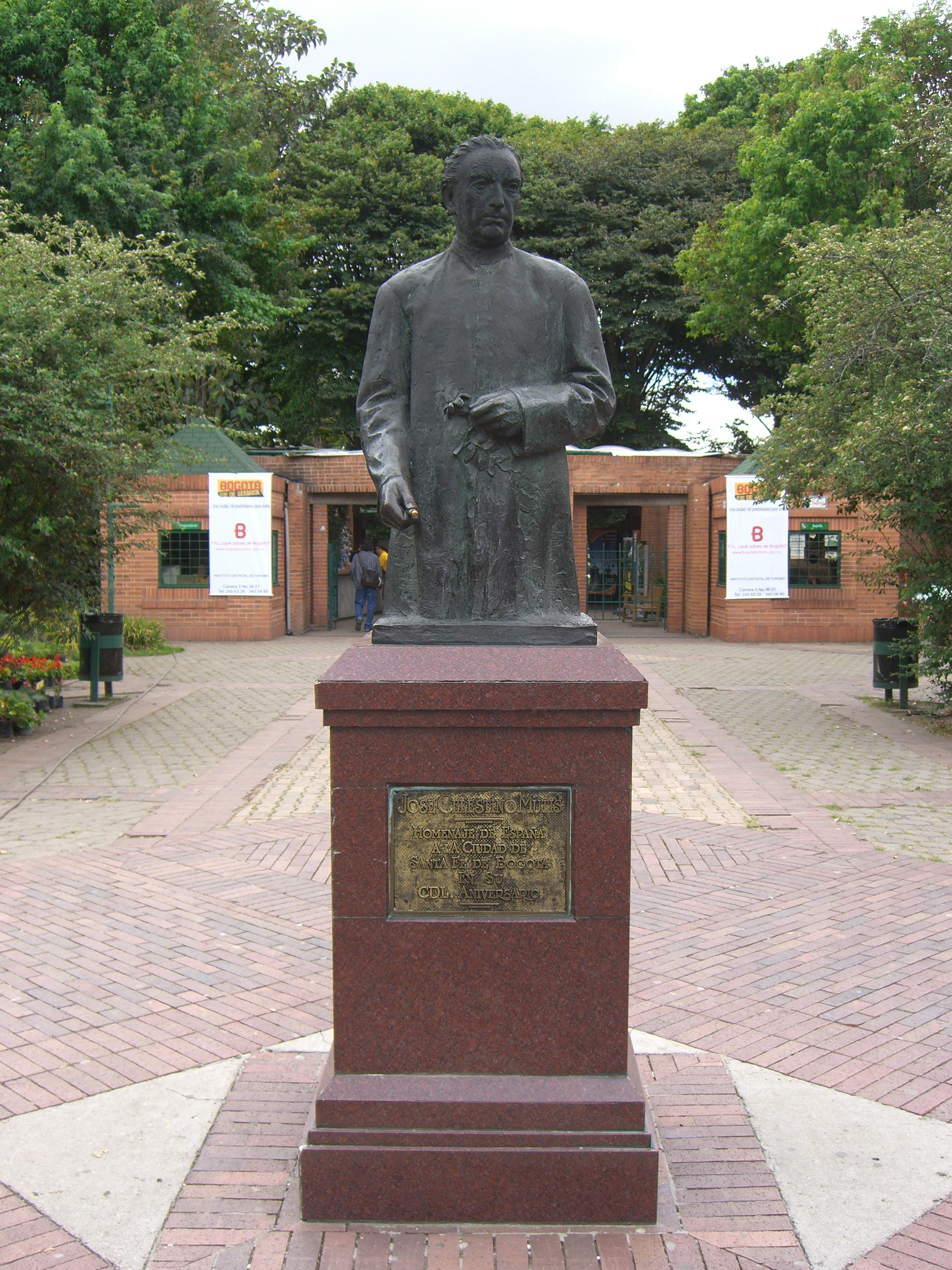
Statue of José Celestino Mutis in one of the entrances of the park

Jose Celestino Mutis was born in Spain in the city of Cádiz in 1732. He graduated in medicine from the University of Seville. In 1783, Under the rule of Charles III of Spain, he headed the Royal Botanical Expedition to New Granada. The expedition was the most important scientific collaboration of the 18th century where over 6,600 new species of flora were discovered and described. Although most of his research was not published and most of the time never completed, he remains as one of the greatest promoters of science and knowledge in the Americas.

In 1937, botanist and priest Dr. Enrique Pérez Arbeláez tried to create a school of botany in the National University. Due to civil wars and disturbances the project was delayed. Finally, on August 6, 1955, the administrative council of Bogotá loaned Arbeláez 43.34 acres of land, and the garden was established. Arbeláez decided to name the garden after Mutis in his honor.

== Symbols ==
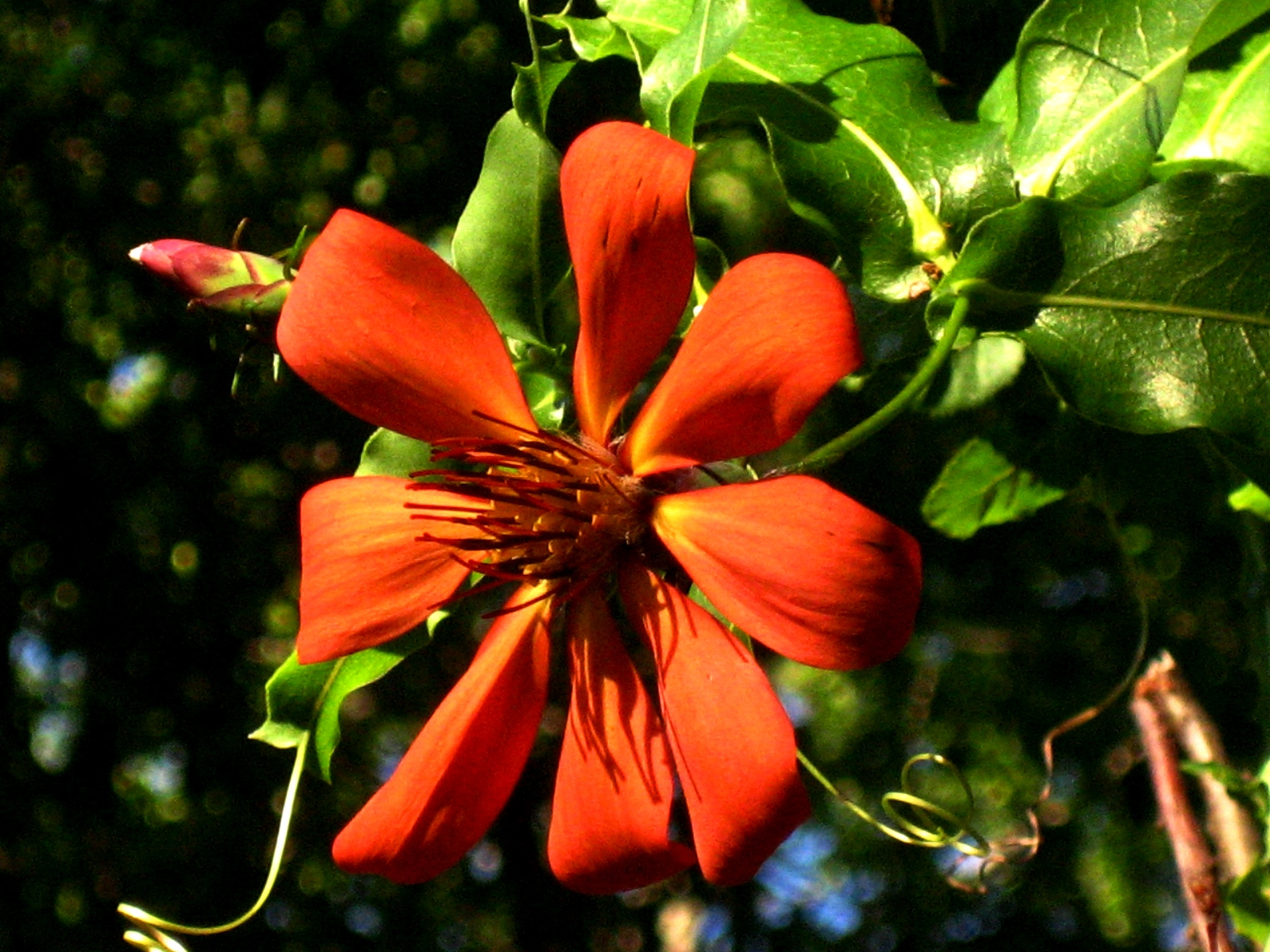
Mutisia

Mutisia clematis, in the family Asteraceae was declared the symbolic plant of the garden. The plant is native to South America and was named in honor of Jose Celestino Mutis himself. Colombia's national plant and flower; the wax tree and the orchid respectively can also be found throughout the garden. The garden hosts over 5000 different species of orchids.

== Programs ==
The garden is involved in joint research with many universities in Bogotá. It runs various workshops in biotechnology and the conservation of endangered species. It also develops programs for children such as the Club Botánico de Ciencias para Niños (Botanical club of science for kids) in which children between the ages of five and twelve can learn the principles of exploration, biodiversity and conservation. The garden not only serves as a research center, but as a place to relax amidst the hub of the busy metropolis. It aims to serve as a space where citizens and tourists alike can learn, respect and protect the environment.

In January 2013, The garden hosted SonEra Solar the first solar-powered music festival in Latin America. A group effort between the garden and the USAID enabled the garden to have the first festival of its kind where the instruments and equipment were powered completely by solar power. Famous Latin American artists headlined the concert such as: Aterciopelados, Sidestepper and Wapapura Solar Sound among others.

== Collections ==
The garden houses around 19000 live plants and around 2346 taxa of cultivated plants.

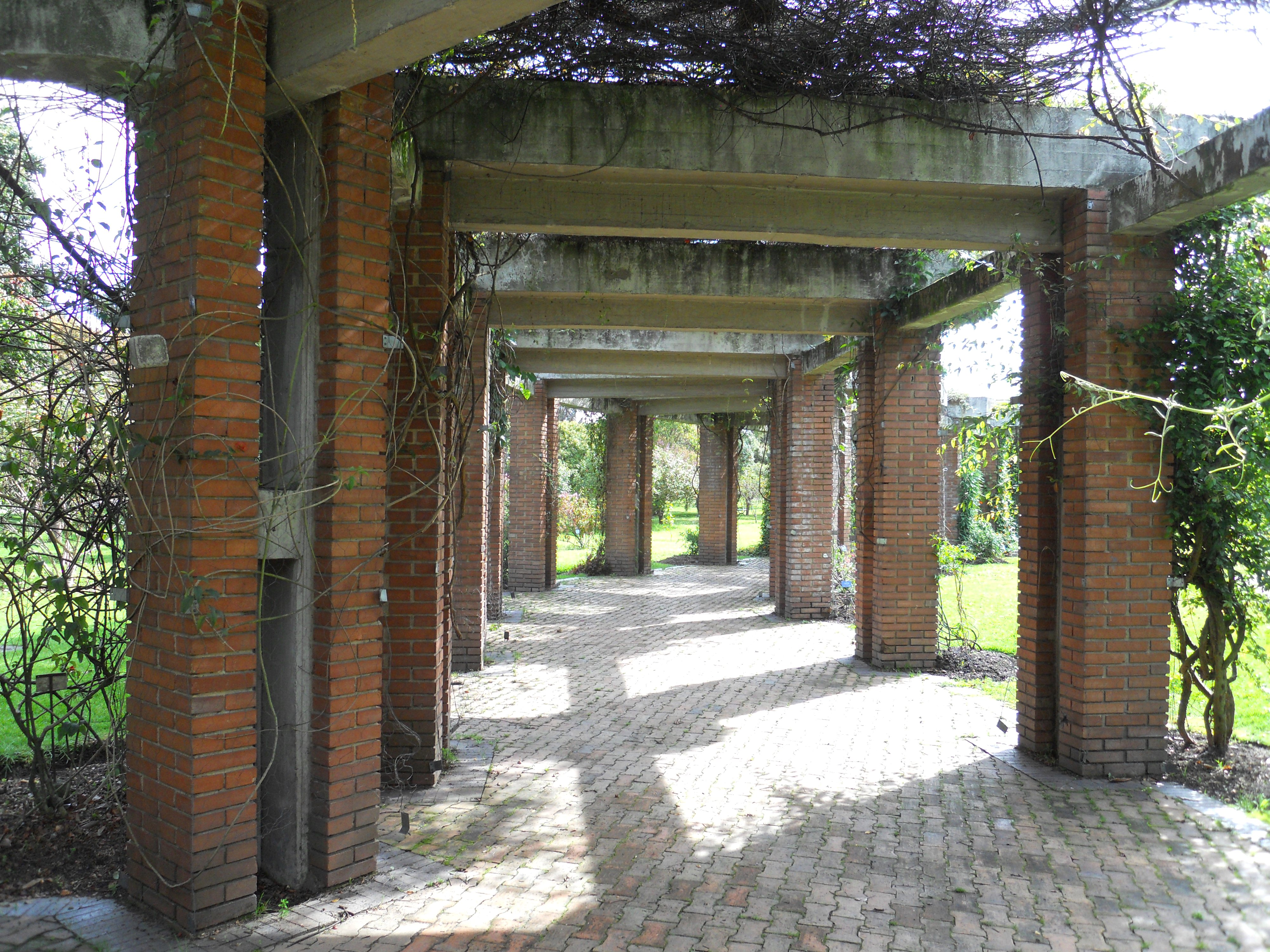
Arcades in the garden's central zone

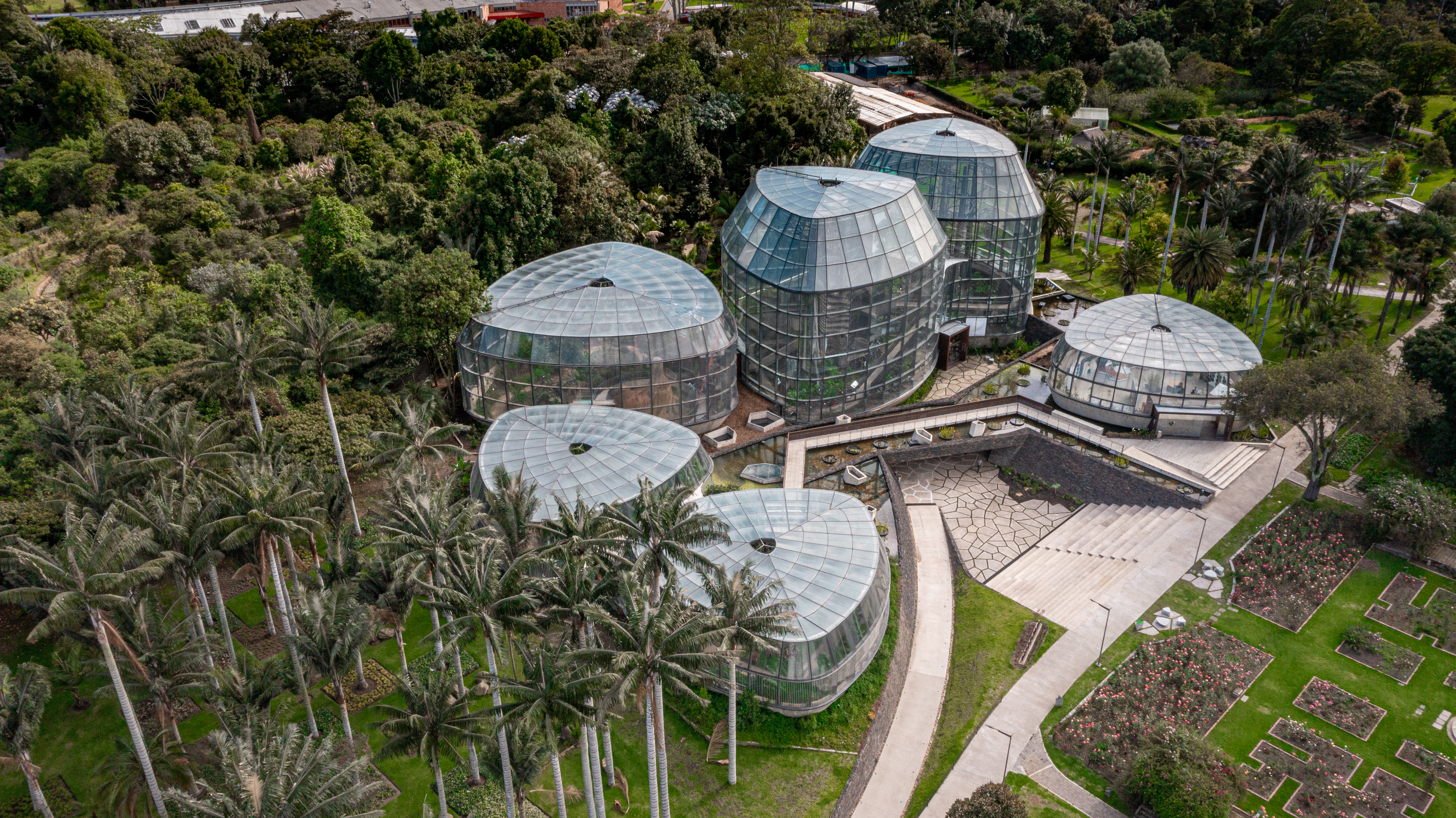
Greenhouses

The garden has five special collections dedicated to the conservation of Andean plants in danger of extinction, these include the botanical families of Araceae, Bromeliaceae, Cactaceae, Lamiaceae y Orchidaceae.

Among the themed gardens, many collections can be found:

- Greenhouses climatized at different temperatures where a variety of flora can be found from different regions in Colombia. From the Guajira, the Páramos to the heights of the Colombian Andes and even the Amazon rainforest.
- Andean woodland plants,
- Medicinal plants,
- Aquatic plants,
- Xerophytic plants and cacti
- Arboretum

== See also ==
- Simón Bolívar Park
