= Simón Bolívar Park =

Urban park in Bogotá, Colombia

Simón Bolívar Metropolitan Park
- Simón Bolívar Park
- Aerial view of Simón Bolívar Park

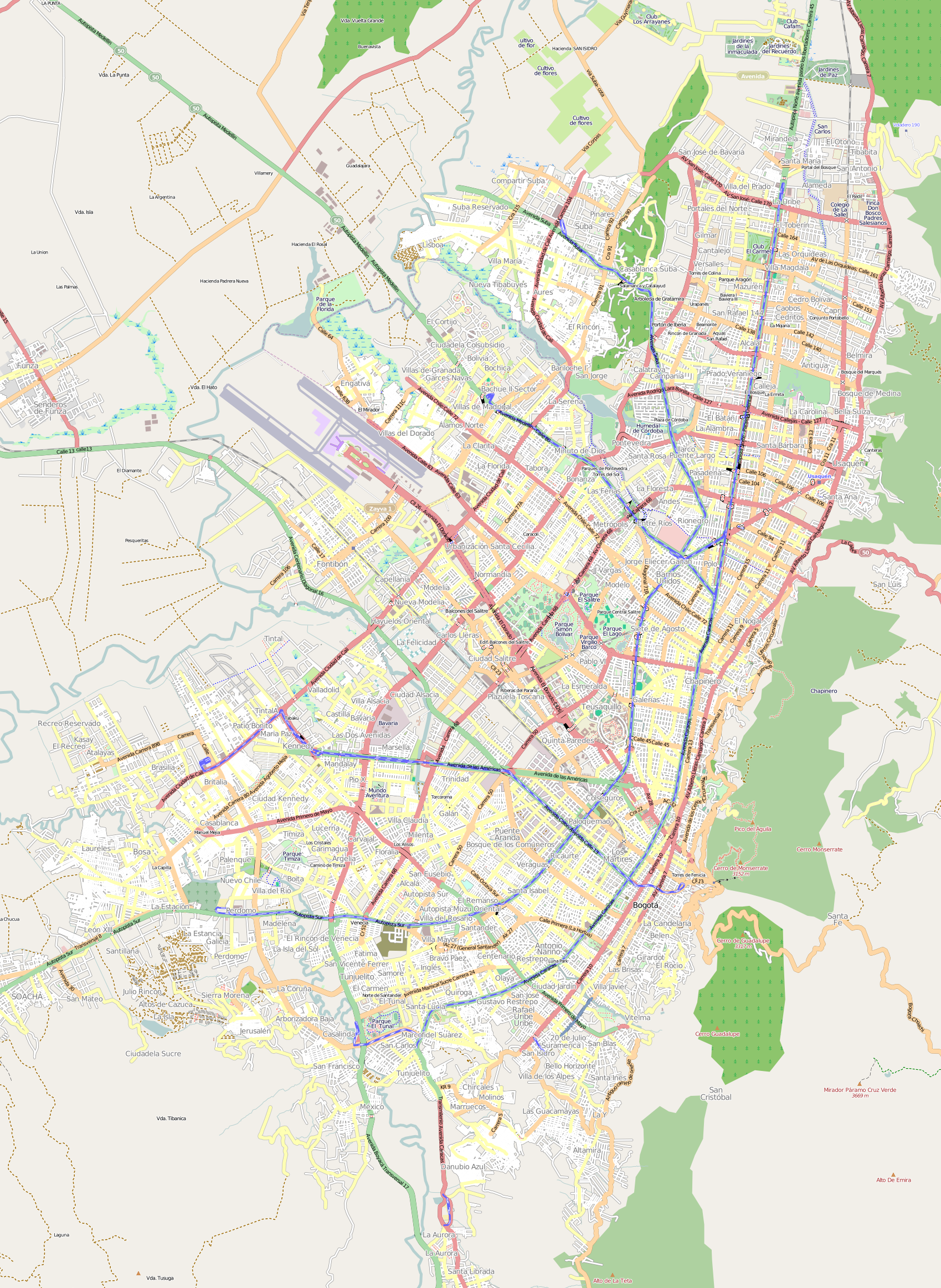
- Location within Bogotá, Colombia
- Location: Bogotá, Colombia
- Coordinates: 4°39′29″N 74°5′38″W
- Area: 400 hectares (988 acres)
- Created: 1979
- Operator: Mayor's Office of Bogotá
- Status: Open all year

The Simón Bolívar Metropolitan Park, best known as the Simón Bolívar Park, is a greenspace and entertainment and sports complex located in the middle of the city of Bogotá, Colombia. It is one of the largest urban parks in the world with over 1000 acres of green spaces, bicycle paths, parks, sports complexes, a public library and the Bogota Botanical Gardens.

The park is named after the Latin American Liberator Simón Bolívar. The park is located in the locality of Teusaquillo and is managed by the District Institute of Recreation and Sport (Instituto Distrital de Recreacion y Deporte - IDRD). The park is one of the most popular urban parks in the city of Bogotá.

The park features a lake in which people can rent paddle boats and a large space for concerts and events capable of holding 140.000 people.

== History ==
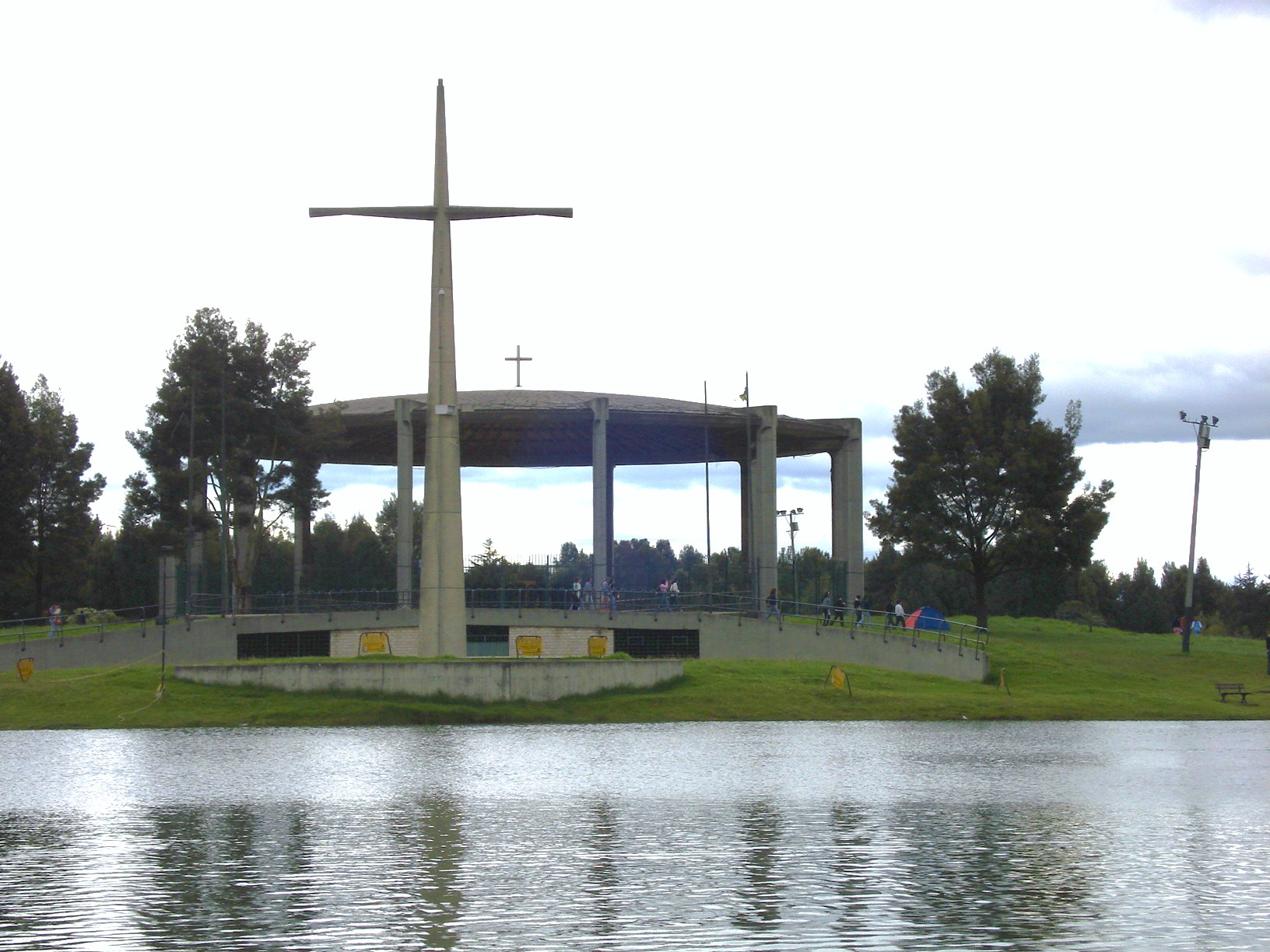
Temple created for the Eucharistic Congress that took place at the Simón Bolívar Park

The construction of Simón Bolívar Park started in 1966. In 1968 the city of Bogotá built a temple to commemorate the 39th International Eucharistic Congress to which the pope Paul VI was a part of. This temple was named Eucharistic Temple. At the time the lake already existed as a natural feature. In 1986 a second temple was built for the reception of Pope John Paul II. The park was officially named under the Law 31 of 1979 in commemoration of the bicentennial of the birth of Latin American leader Simón Bolívar.

Colombian architect Arturo Robledo Ocampo designed in 1982 the details of new improvements to the park which at the time was far from an actual recreational space. Ocampo developed the plans for tree growing areas, the central plaza and also designed the water supply and structures such as channels and walls. In 1983 the Events Plaza was finally built. 3300 trees were planted and a pedestrian bridge that linked the park with the Children's Museum was inaugurated. In 1995 the pedestrian pathways were made bigger from 5 meters to 10 meters wide. The stage area of the Events Plaza was closed in the perimeters and the illumination was improved. Three new access points were added.

Since 1996 new social programs have been created in order to make the park an events center. This include as of now the Summer Festival, and the Rock to the park festival making it the axis of recreational activities for the city.

== Parks System ==
The Simón Bolívar Park is in fact a system of adjacent greenspaces. Its extension is over 970 acres (3.9 km^{2}), bigger than the Central Park extension in New York. At the present time it is considered the "lung of the city" due to its central location and because of its size and its vegetation. The park is conformed among others by the following parks:

=== Simón Bolívar Central Park (PCSB) ===
It's the main greenspace, it has an area of about 279 acres (1.13 km^{2}). A lake with an area of over 27 acres (110,000 m^{2}). It features over 11 miles (18 km) of pedestrian pathways and an acoustic shell-shaped area for concerts. Major concerts and festivals mainly take place in this area.

=== The Salitre Park ===
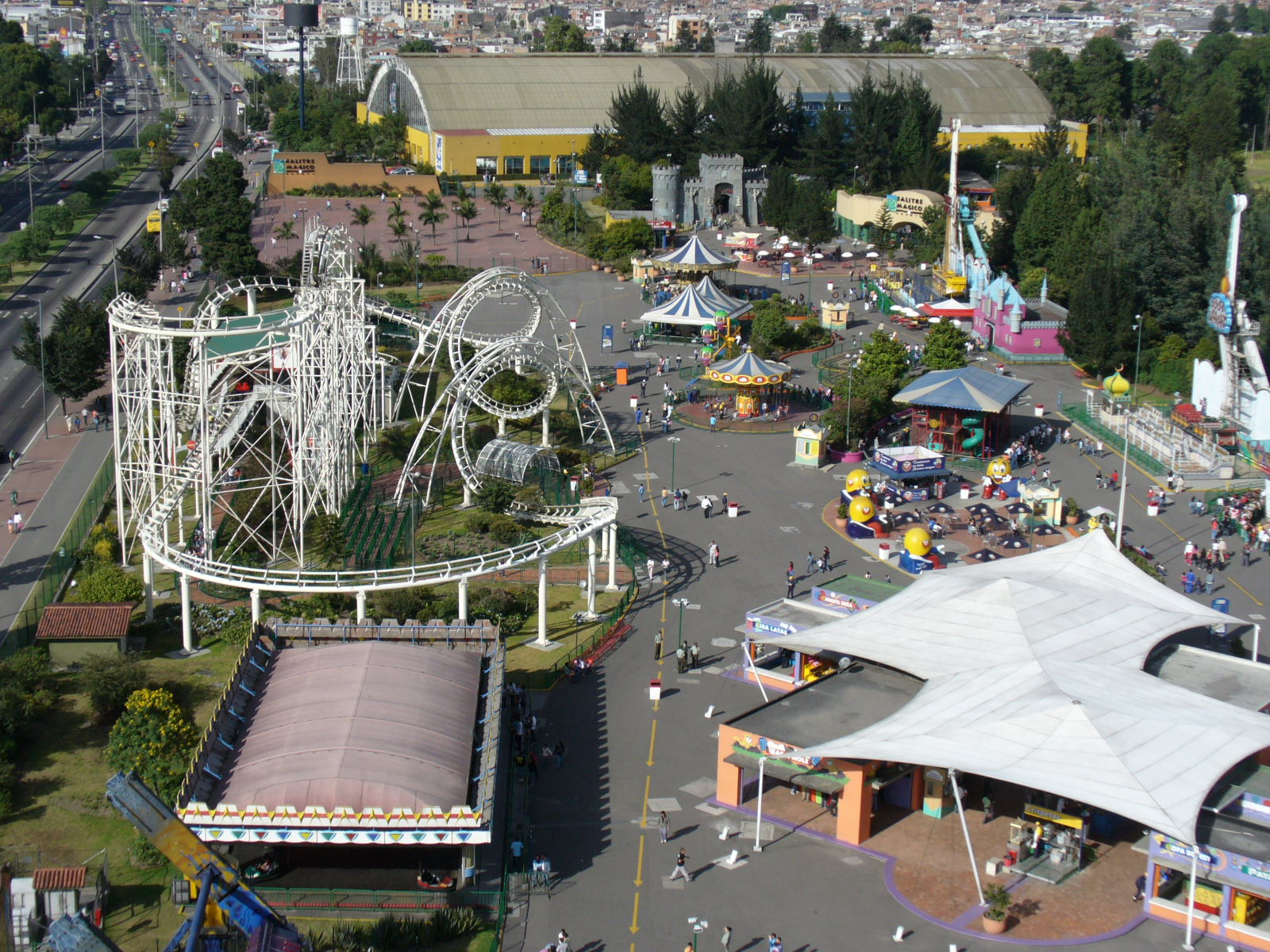
View from the Ferris wheel of The Salitre Park. Water park can be seen in the background as a roofed structure

Commonly and formerly known as The Salitre Park and officially named Magic Salitre (Salitre Magico) is a recreational area and amusement park that includes amusement rides. The park is best known for its Ferris wheel from where there is a nice view of the city. The park features three rollercoasters as well. Additionally the park features a roof covered waterpark with pools and water slides. The Salitre is currently administered by a Mexican private company which has improved and remodeled the park that used to be managed by the government of Bogotá.

=== Park SportsRecreation El Salitre (Parque RecreoDeportivo El Salitre) ===
Is a sports complex located adjacent to the Magic Salitre Park. It has courts for the practicing of different sports especially soccer and basketball. It also features a small coliseum for small events.

=== Park of the Lake (Los Novios Park) ===
Los Novios Park (boyfriends-girlfriends park) with an area of over 53 acres (210,000 m^{2}), this park features soccer fields and a motocross and BMX dirt tracks. This park has 19 kiosks for barbecue and picnic activities. This park is accessible through the Transmilenio system. One of the main attractions of this park is its lakes where people can rent pedal boats.

=== Sports Palace (Palacio de los Deportes) ===
Is a dedicated roof covered coliseum for concerts and events for an audience not bigger than 5.000 spectators. The Sports Palace is one of the most used spaces in the complex for the organization of local events and theatrical functions due to its versatility and the advantage of being a covered space. (See concerts section for information about artist that have performed at the arena).

=== Simón Bolívar Aquatic Complex ===
Is a space that features three pools. A training pool, an Olympic pool and a diving pool whose technical specifications have been endorsed by the International Federation of Swimming. The complex has stands for an audience of 1.500 people, parking lots for 300 vehicles, sauna, dressing rooms, gym and a cafeteria. The water is kept at 27 degrees Celsius through a boiling system located in a basement of 2.000 square meters.

=== El Salitre Sports Unit ===
Is a sports center with facilities for the practicing of a variety of sports from indoors to outdoors. El Salitre Coliseum (second in importance to the El Campin Coliseum) and the velodrome Luis Carlos Galan are located in this unit. The latter especially built for the 1995 UCI Track Cycling World Championships. It is also the headquarters of the city sports leagues with their respective training fields. It has a public bowling center and connections to pedestrian bridges above the 68th Avenue to the Central Park Simón Bolívar.

== Concerts ==
The park's Events Plaza is the venue of most of the concerts of international singers when they perform in Bogota, since 2005 concerts were banned in El Campin Stadium so the only place to hold big concerts was the park. Since 2012, the Stadium can be used again for concerts one a month. The Events Plaza have a maximum capacity for 100,000 people.

On May 2, 1999, Metallica performed for the first time in Colombia with a sold-out show, holding the record for the highest attendance concert with 100,000 people attending for one only show.

During her The Sweet Escape Tour, Gwen Stefani performed the only show in South America for the tour, in front of 30,000 spectators.

Iron Maiden performed for the first time in the country in front of more than 38,788 people. The show was recorded for the Iron Maiden: Flight 666 DVD.

Depeche Mode performed at the park on October 10, 2009, during their Tour of the Universe. The band will perform again on March 16, 2018, during their Global Spirit Tour.

On March 10, 2010, Metallica performed for the second time in the venue in front of 28,291 people. All platinum and VIP tickets were sold.

On May 19, 2010, Aerosmith performed a sold-out show. The band holds the record for fastest sell out concert at the park for their first show, with 3 hours and 40,000 tickets sold.

American rock band Red Hot Chili Peppers performed for the first time in the country in the events plaza on September 11, 2011, in front of 19,654 people. The show was the kick-off presentation for their "I'm with You Tour".

Britney Spears performed for the first time in Colombia in front of 20,000 spectators on November 26, 2011, during her Femme Fatale Tour. Tickets for a Meet & Greet with Spears sold out in within 1 minute, Platino tickets were sold out.

The Cure performed for the first time in Colombia in 2013.

Metallica performed for the third time in the park on March 6, 2014. Sold-out concert, more than 40,000 people attended making the band to break the record for artist with the highest attendance in the history of the venue. The total attendance for their three shows at the park is more than 140,000 people.

Pearl Jam performed for the first time in Colombia on November 25, 2015, during their Pearl Jam 2015 Latin America Tour.

== Gallery ==
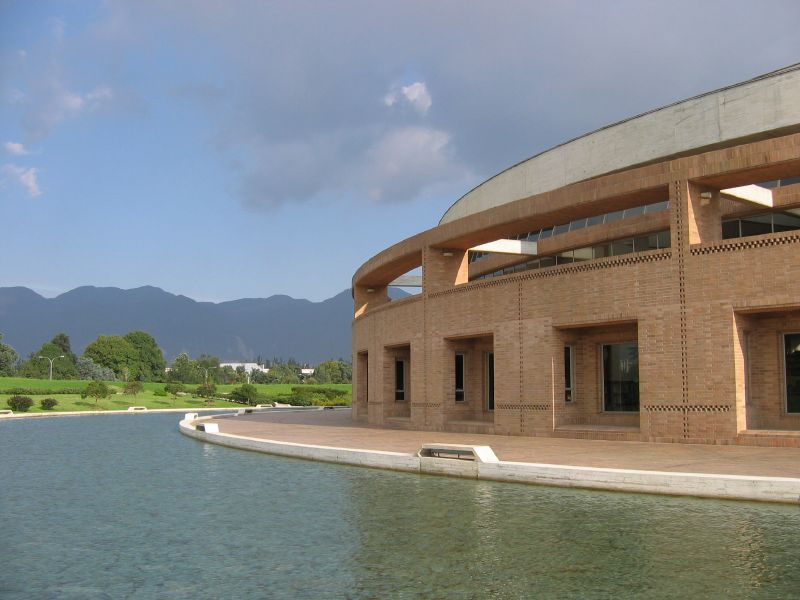
Virgilio Barco Library

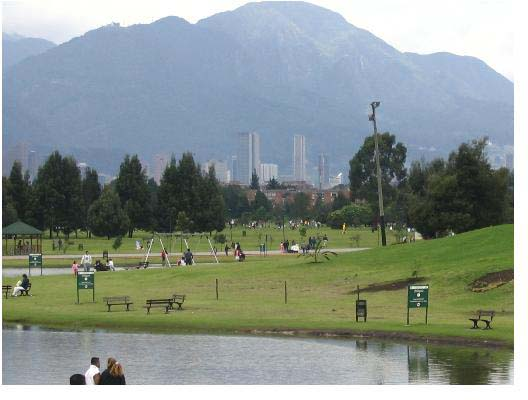
View of the Bogotá Hills from Simón Bolívar Park

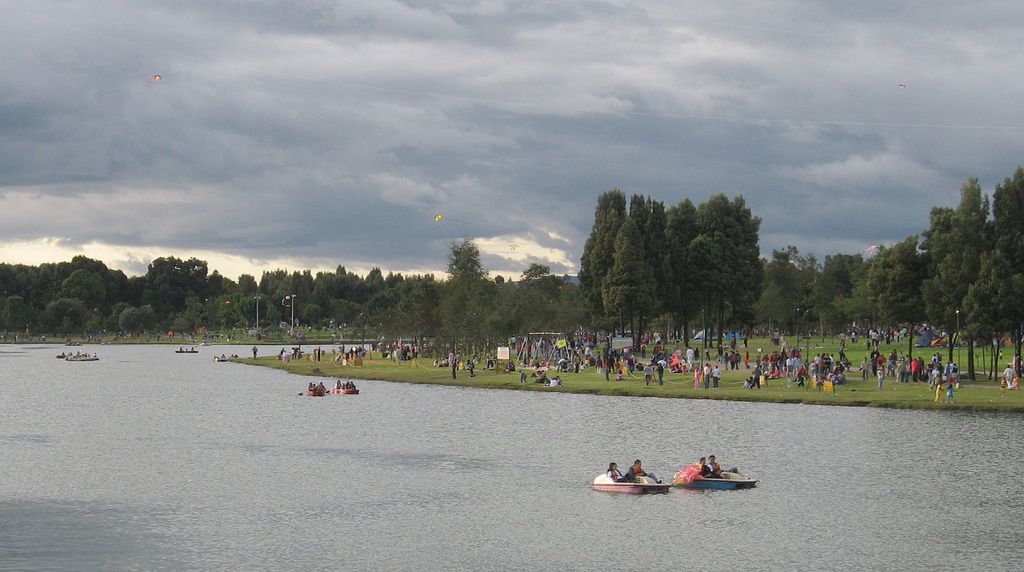
Summer Festival

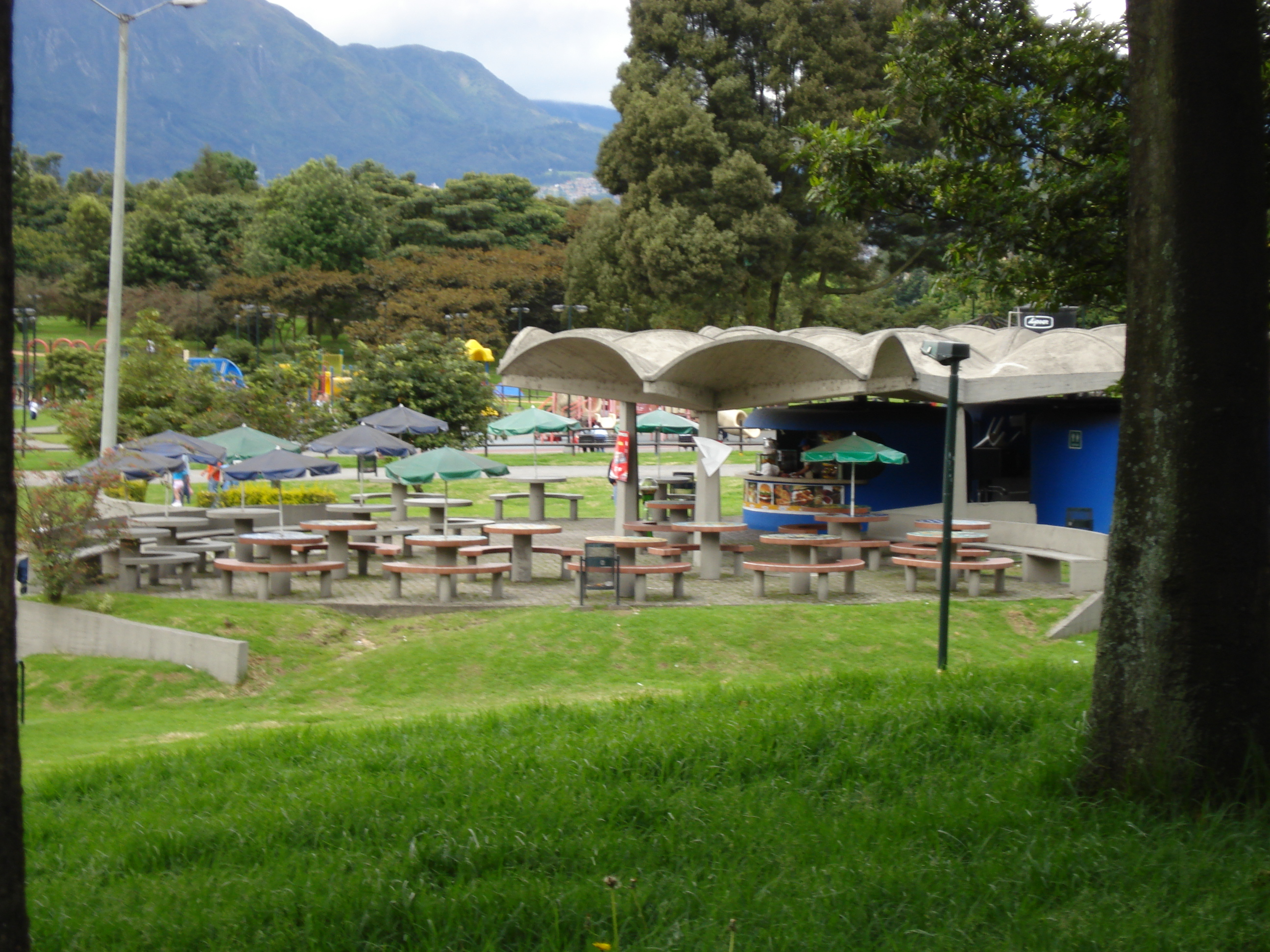
Outdoor picnic area

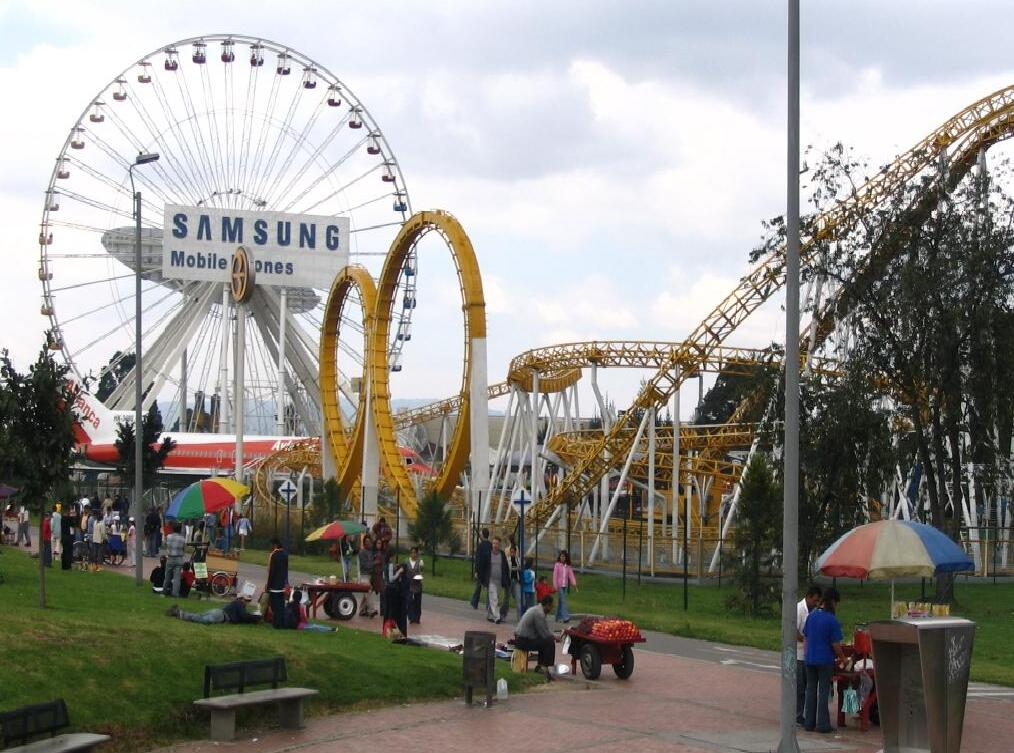
Salitre Park

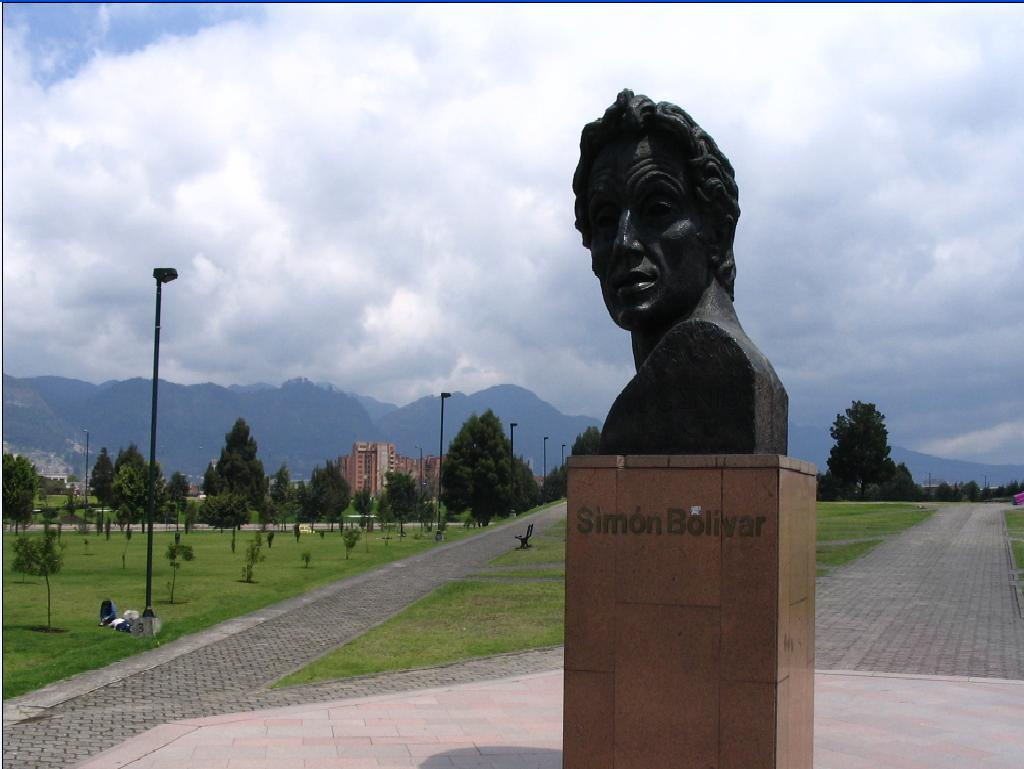
Bust of Simón Bolívar

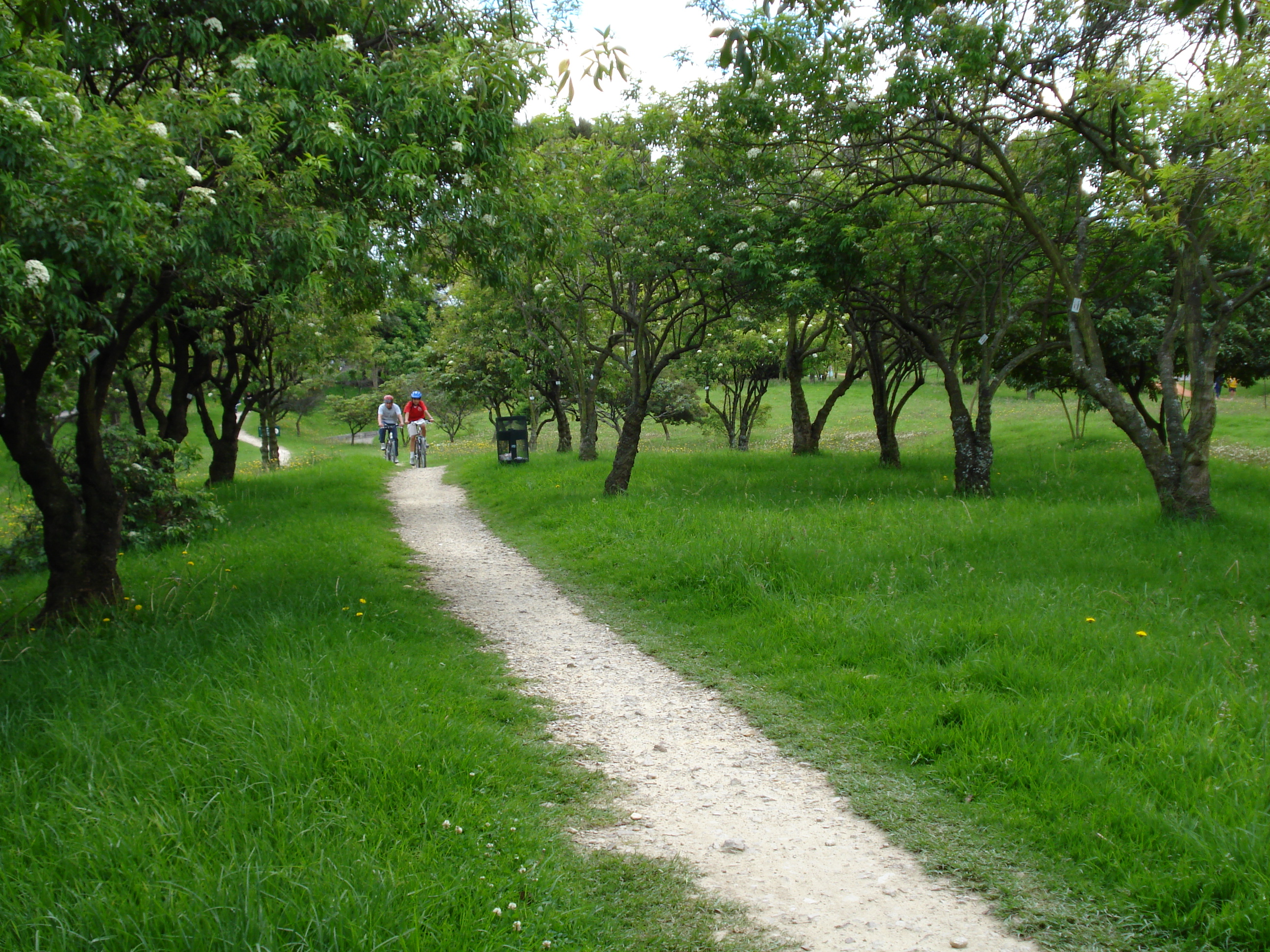
Biking track

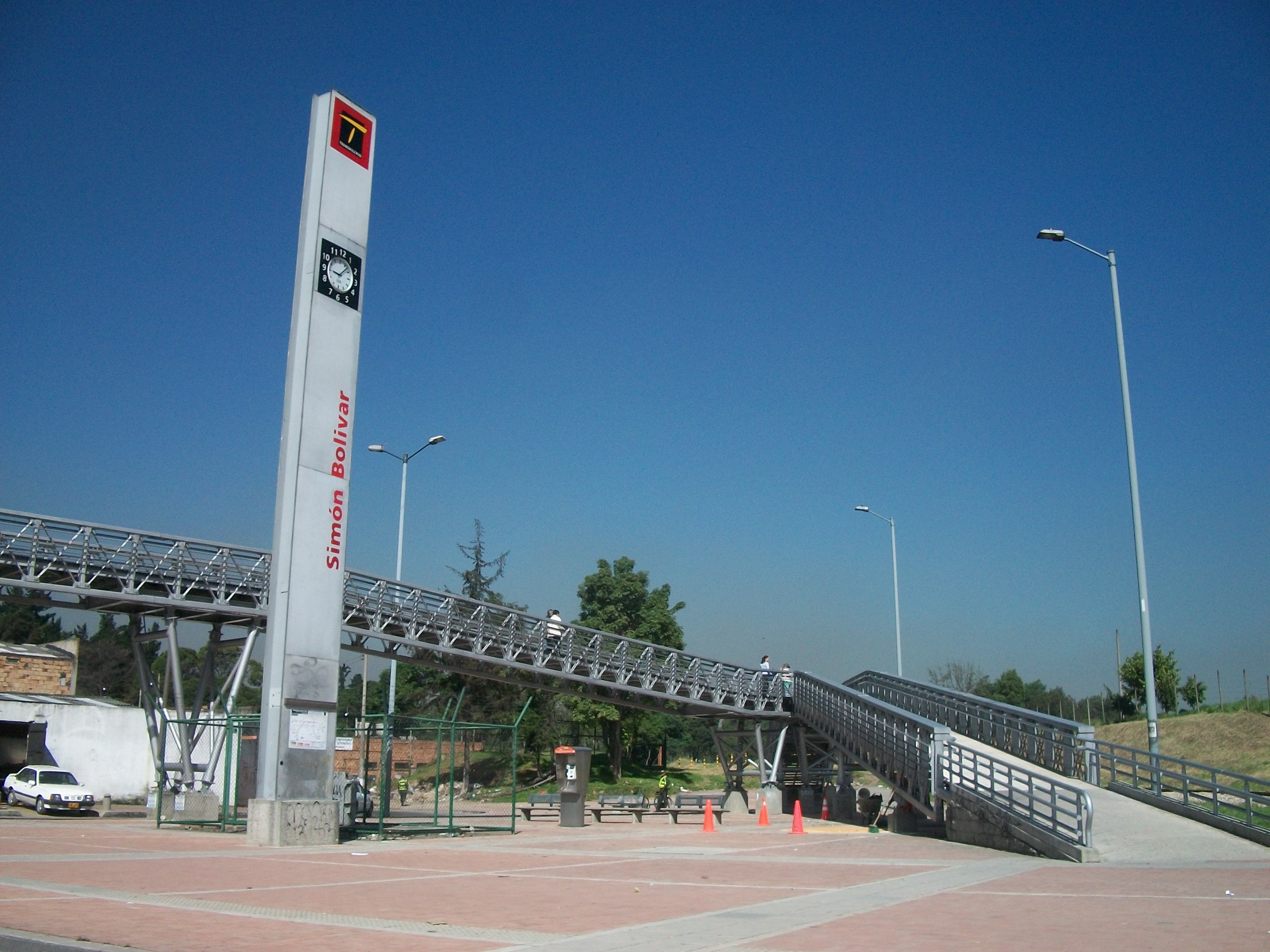
Transmilenio Station

== See also ==
- 93 Park
- Coliseo El Pueblo
- Coliseo Cubierto El Campín
- Metropolitan Area of Bogotá
- Corferias
