= Chapinero Alto =

Barrio in Bogotá, Colombia

- Barrio
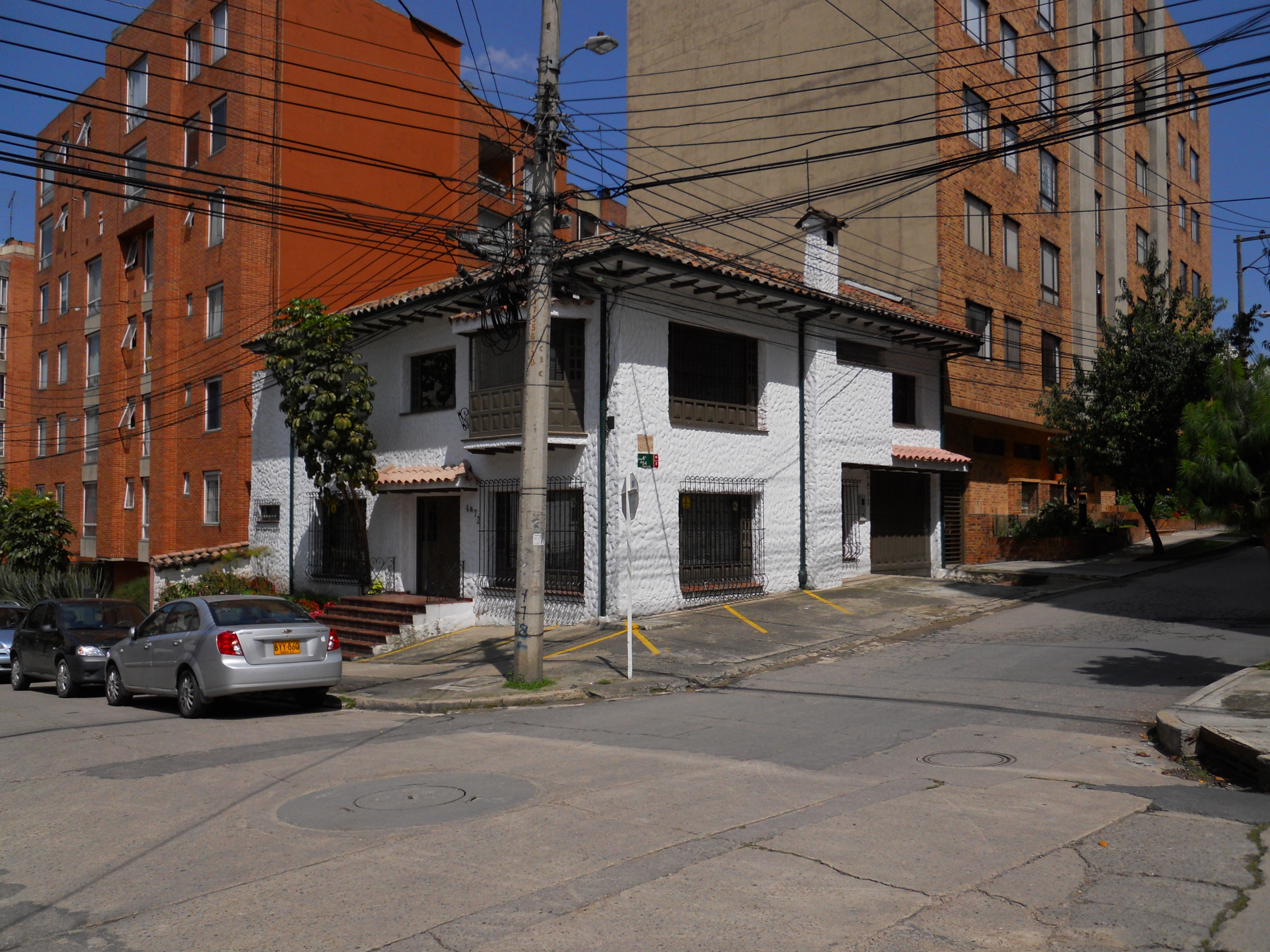
- House on Fifty-fourth Street and Fourth Avenue.
- Country: Colombia
- Department: Distrito Capital
- City: Bogotá
- Locality: Chapinero
- Time zone: UTC-5:00
- Postal code: 110231

Chapinero Alto is one of 50 neighborhoods (barrios) in the locality of Chapinero in Bogotá, Colombia.

== Limits ==
North - calle 72
East - eastern hills
West - carrera 7
South - calle 40

== History ==
According to a November 2021 document by the locality of Chapinero, between 1993 and 2005, there was an increase in foreigners coming to live in the neighborhood. This occurred particularly between calle 63 and calle 100. These non-Colombian immigrants were of higher social status and were able to launch careers and hold a higher standard of living.

The neighborhood is currently considered a very affluent area of Bogotá, both residentially and commercially. A 2014 El Tiempo article stated Chapinero Alto as having "an infinity" of restaurants, stores, theaters, offices, clubs, and public transportation. Vogue has referred to it as "the Williamsburg of Bogotá."
