= 93 Park =

Park in Bogotá, Colombia

- Parque de la 93
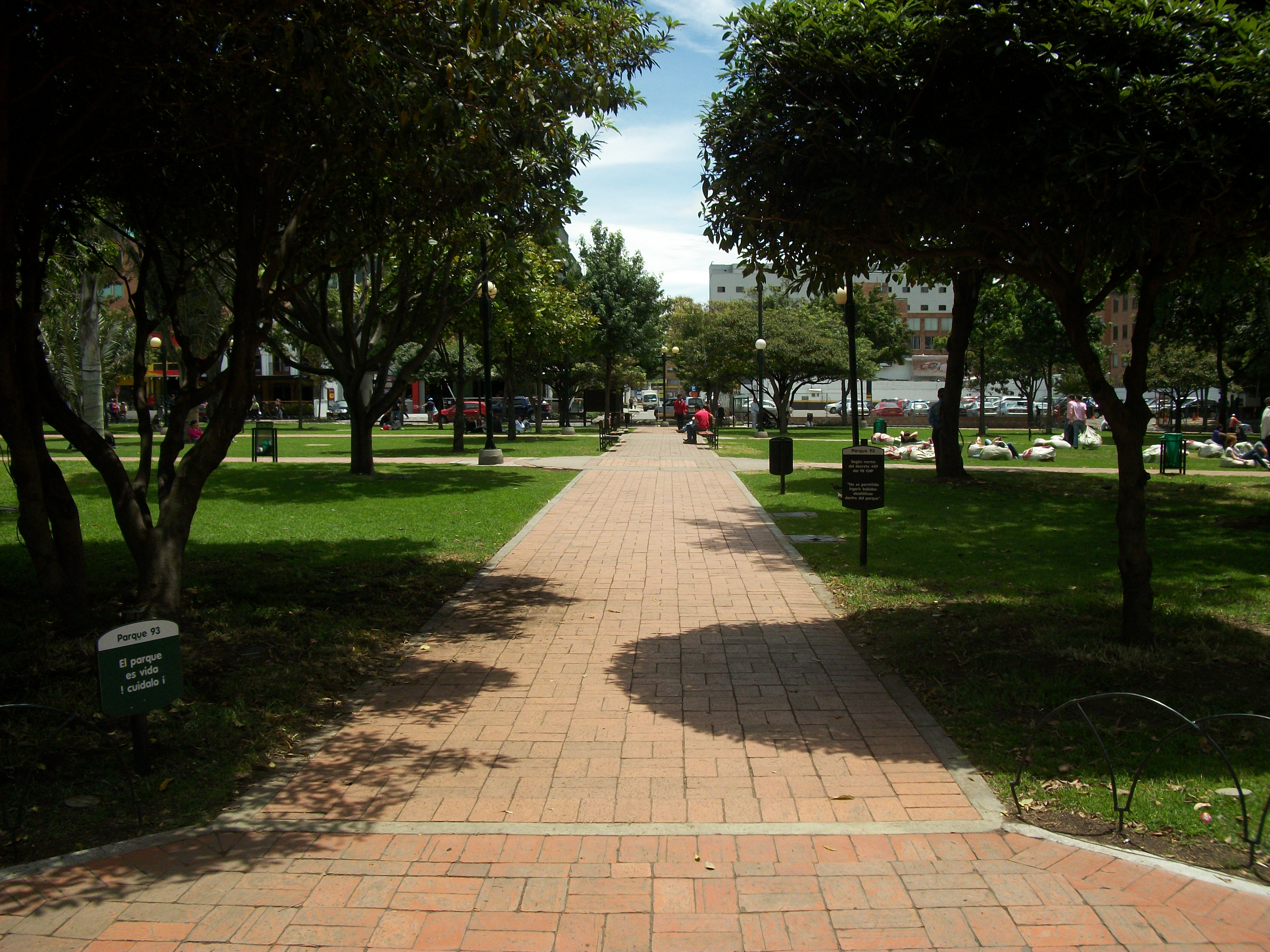
- View of 93 Park

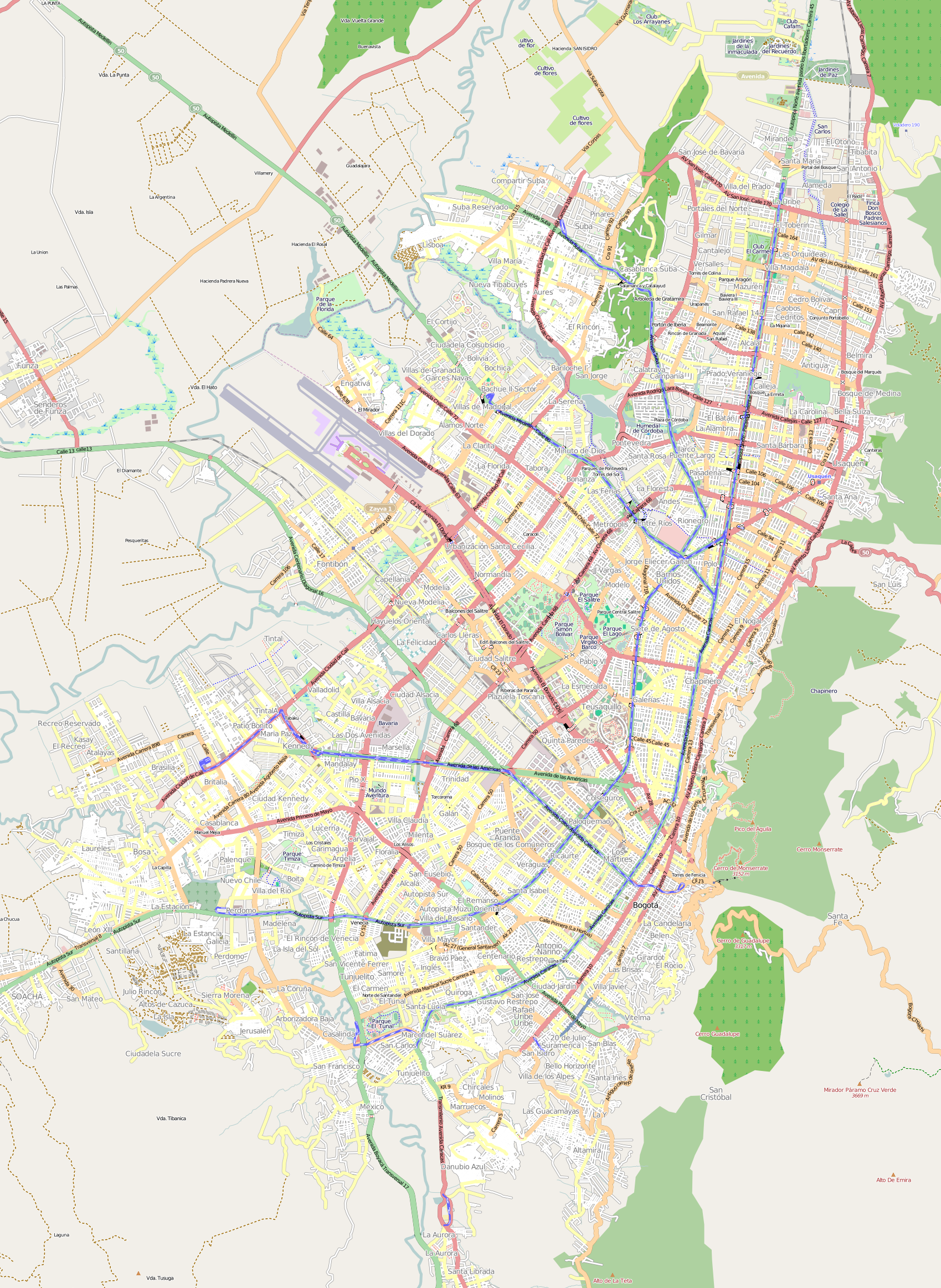
- Location within Bogotá, Colombia
- Interactive map of 93 Park
- Location: El Chicó, Chapinero; Bogotá, Colombia
- Coordinates: 4°40′37″N 74°2′55″W
- Created: 1979
- Operator: Mayor's Office of Bogotá. Asociacion Amigos del Parque de la 93 (Association 93 Park's Friends)
- Open: All year
- Status: Public park
- Website: Website

93 Park or 93rd Street Park (Parque de la calle 93, commonly known as Parque de la 93) is a commercial and recreational park located at the 93rd Street (calle 93) in El Chicó, in the north of Bogotá, Colombia. It is an upmarket area popular for shopping, nightlife and restaurants.

== History ==
=== 20th century ===
The park emerged as a result of the immense growth and expansion of Bogotá to the north on the Bogotá savanna. The affluent neighbourhood El Chicó is part of the locality Chapinero. After the expansion of Bogotá north into Chapinero, this area, together with the Zona T, became the centers of nightlife and entertainment in the city.

=== 21st century ===
In the beginning of the 21st century, the park became the most popular park in the north of Bogotá, where public venues as entertainment, publicly viewed football matches were shown. The park also hosts temporary expositions. With Christmas, the park is decorated with lighting and a large Christmas tree is erected in the park.

== Location ==
The park is a center of nightlife in Bogotá, located in the district of Chapinero where clubs, restaurants, shops, art galleries, auctions, design centers are abundant.

== Places of interest ==
The most notable are the restaurants around the park, as Café Renault, Gato Negro, Juan Valdez café, the gardens, and design centers and nightclubs in the surrounding area.

At the western park edge, Colombia's first Starbucks was opened in 2015.

== Accessibility ==
The park can be accessed from the main Carreras 11 and 15.

== See also ==
- Simon Bolivar Park
