= Wax tree =

Wax tree is a common name for several plants and may refer to:

- Catalpa
- Ligustrum lucidum, native to southern China
- Toxicodendron succedaneum
