= Chapinero =

Locality in Bogotá, Colombia

- Locality of Bogotá
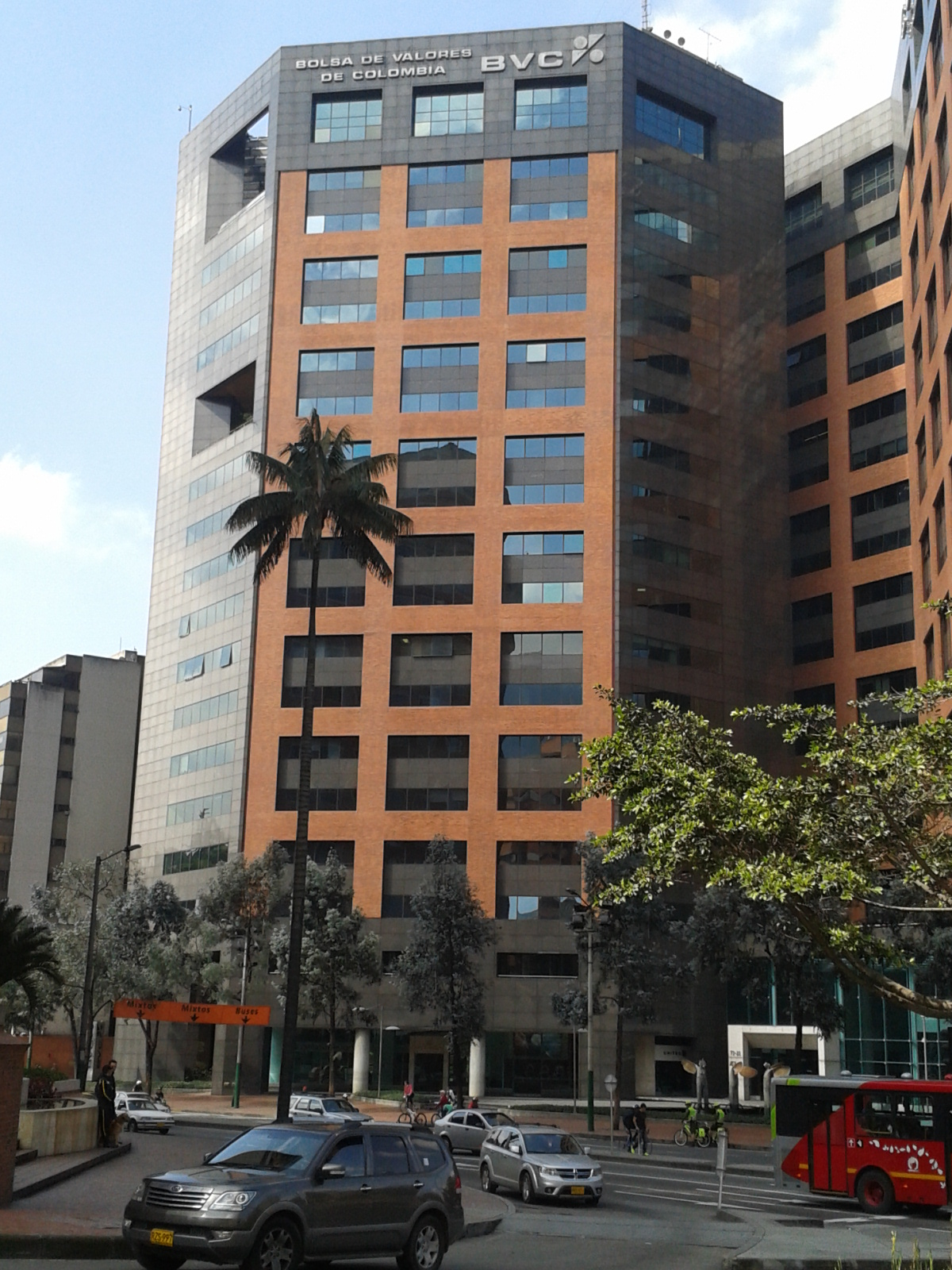
- Colombia Stock Exchange Building

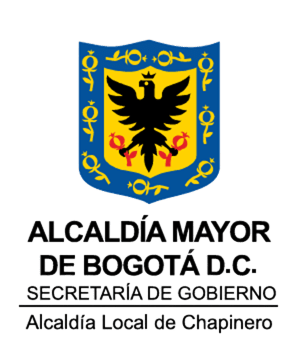
- Coat of arms

- Location of the locality in the city of Bogotá

- Location of the locality in the Capital District of Bogotá
- Coordinates: 4°38′45″N 74°03′48″W
- Country: Colombia
- City: Bogotá D.C.
- Neighbourhoods: List: Chapinero Alto; Chapinero Norte; Chapinero Central; El Chicó; Chicó Alto; La Porciúncula; Marly; Los Rosales; Juan XXIII; Bellavista; El Nogal; El Refugio; La Cabrera; Seminario; Toscana; La Esperanza Nororiental; La Sureña; San Isidro; San Luis Altos del Cabo; Bosque Calderón; Bosque Calderón Tejada; El Castillo; El Paraíso; Emaus; Granada; Nueva Granada; Sucre; La Salle; Las Acacias; Los Olivos; María Cristina; Mariscal Sucre; Ingemar; Palomar; Pardo Rubio; San Martín de Porres; Villa Anita; Villa del Cerro; Antiguo Country; El Retiro; Espartillal; La Cabrera; Lago Gaitán; Quinta Camacho; Cataluña; Chicó Norte; Chicó Norte II; Chicó Norte III; Chicó Occidental; Chicó Reservado

Area
  - Total: 38.15 km^{2} (14.73 sq mi)
- Elevation: 2,600 m (8,500 ft)

Population (2016)
  - Total: 166,000
  - Density: 4,350/km^{2} (11,300/sq mi)
- Time zone: UTC-5 (Colombia Standard Time)
- Website: chapinero.gov.co

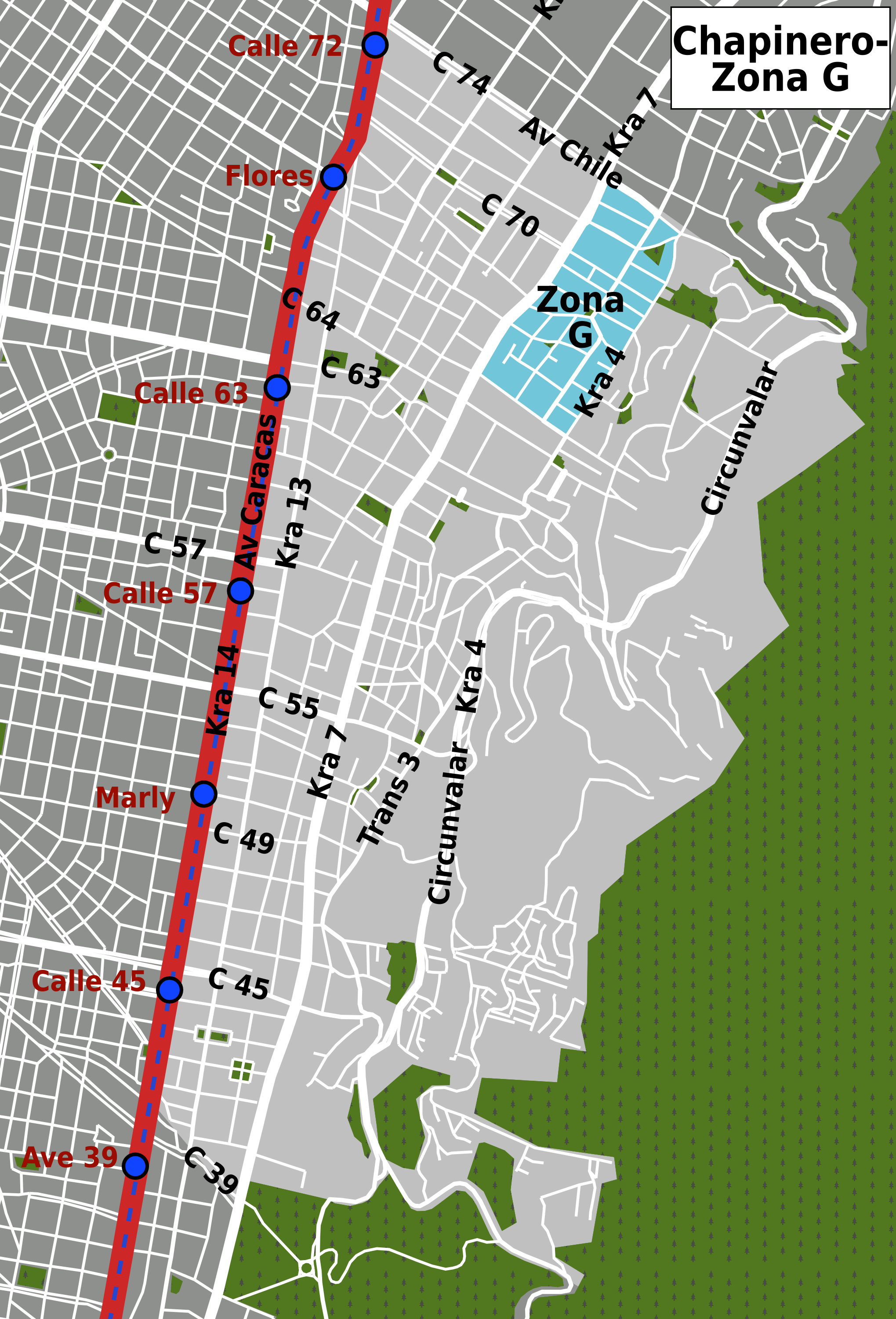
Map of the southern half of Chapinero

Chapinero is the 2nd locality of Bogotá, capital of Colombia. It is located in the north of the city and is one of the more affluent districts of the city. This district is mostly inhabited by upper-class residents, although it also encompasses less wealthy neighborhoods such as Bosque Calderón Tejada or El Paraíso that started out as informal settlements. The boundaries are Calle 39 in the south, Avenida Caracas in the west, Calle 100 in the north and the Eastern Hills in the east.

The Central Business District (CBD) is located between Calle 72 (traditionally known as the Financial District) in the south and Calle 100 in the north. Chapinero hosts several important leisure, dining and nightlife areas of the city. The locality covers 3,899 hectares (9,630 acres). 35.1% is considered urban area, 23.1% unbuilt area; 20.4% residential area and 21.2% protected rural area.

== History ==
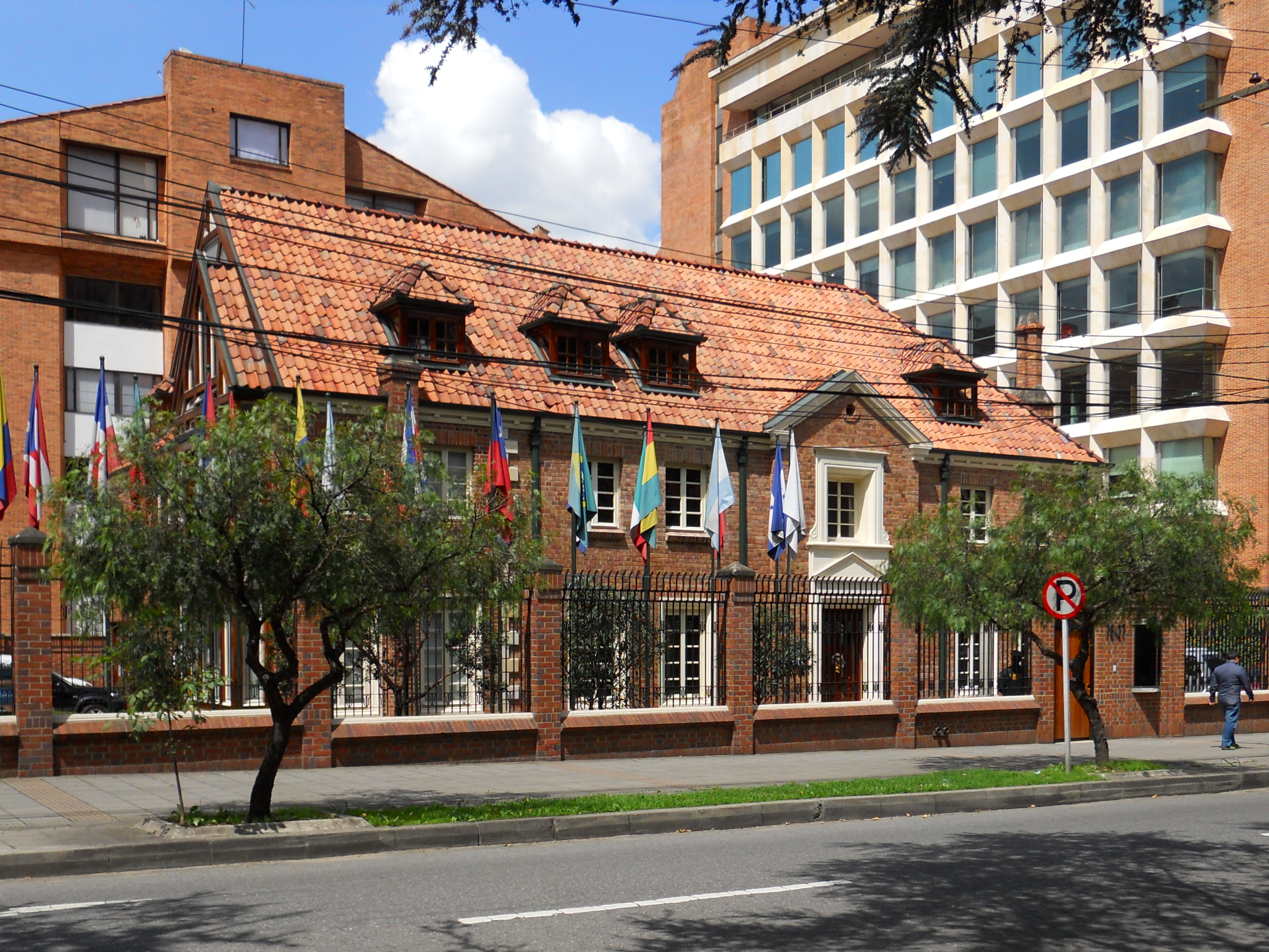
English architecture in El Nogal

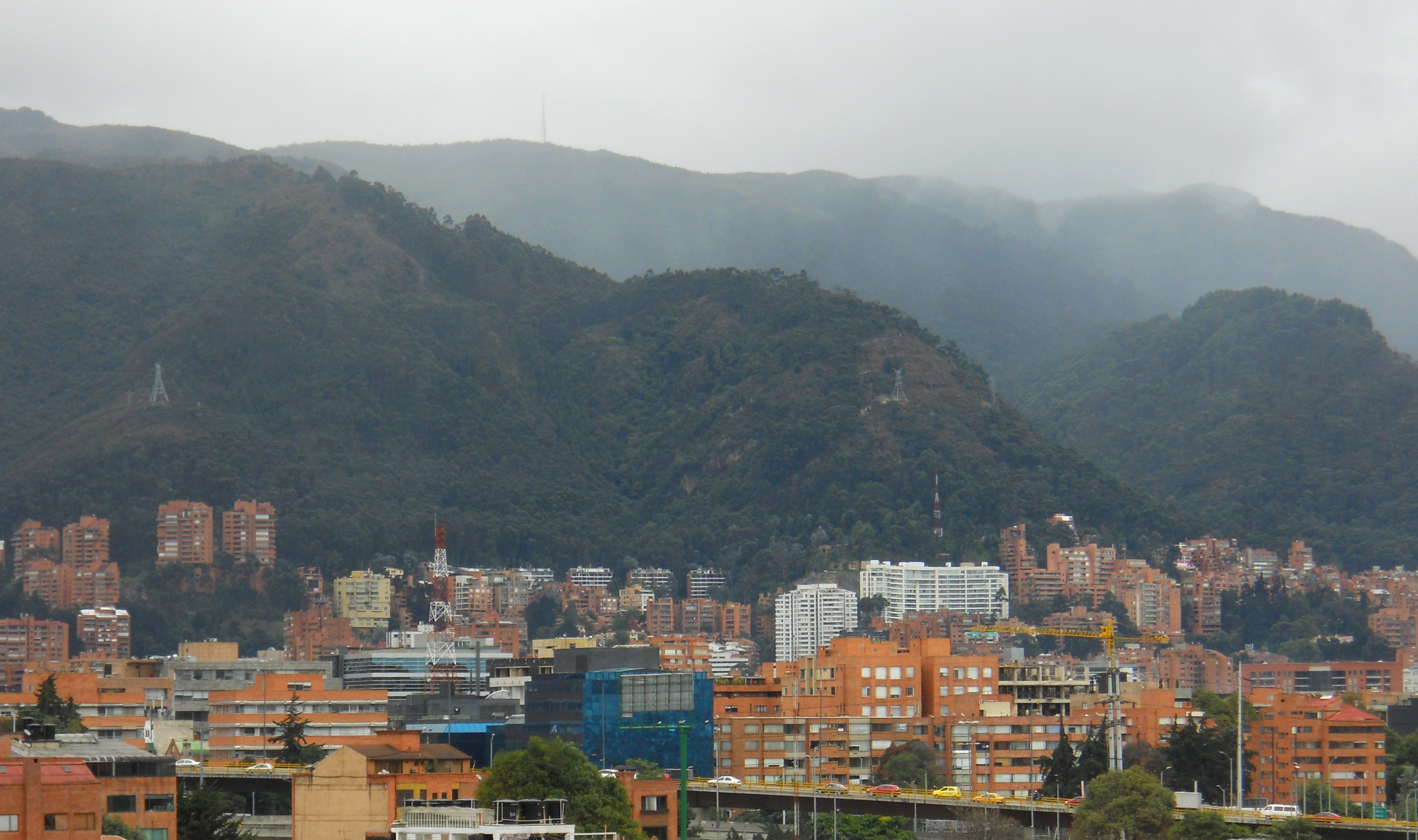
North of the District of Chapinero in Bogota

Chapinero was part of the thoroughfare connecting Bogotá and the northern part of the country. The area was settled in 1812 by workers in the various industries that provided Bogotá with its day-to-day necessities. The name Chapinero comes from the shoemakers of bespoke shoes for chapines, the local expression for people suffering of pigeon toe syndrome.

Toward the end of the 19th century, the area was further settled with mansions and country estates. As the urbanized city expanded, the area was integrated accordingly. Mule-pulled trams were extended northward in 1875, followed by electric tracks in 1910.

When the Special District of Bogotá was formed in 1955, the area was made into a locality. At that time the El Lago, Chicó, and Cataluña neighborhoods were added into the locality. The physical boundaries remained the same under the reorganization into the Capital District that took place in 1991.

Together with La Candelaria and Teusaquillo, Chapinero is one of the traditional neighborhoods that is distinctive of a particular era in the city's history and urban growth. A historically upper-class neighborhood, the southern part of Chapinero is famous for areas with large Victorian houses reflecting the influence of European architectural styles in Bogotá at the beginning of the 20th century.

== Economy and culture ==
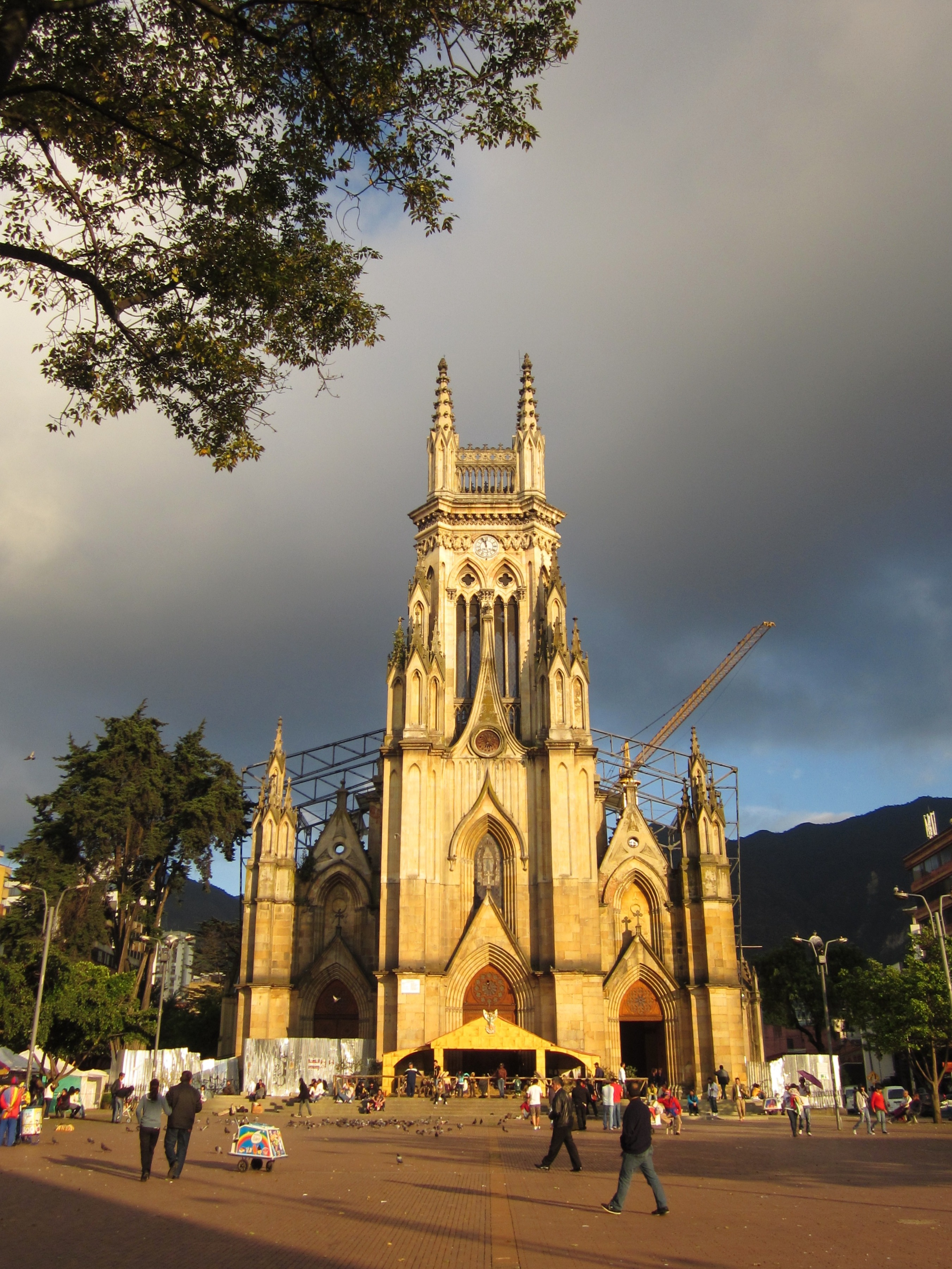
Our Lady of Lourdes Basilica

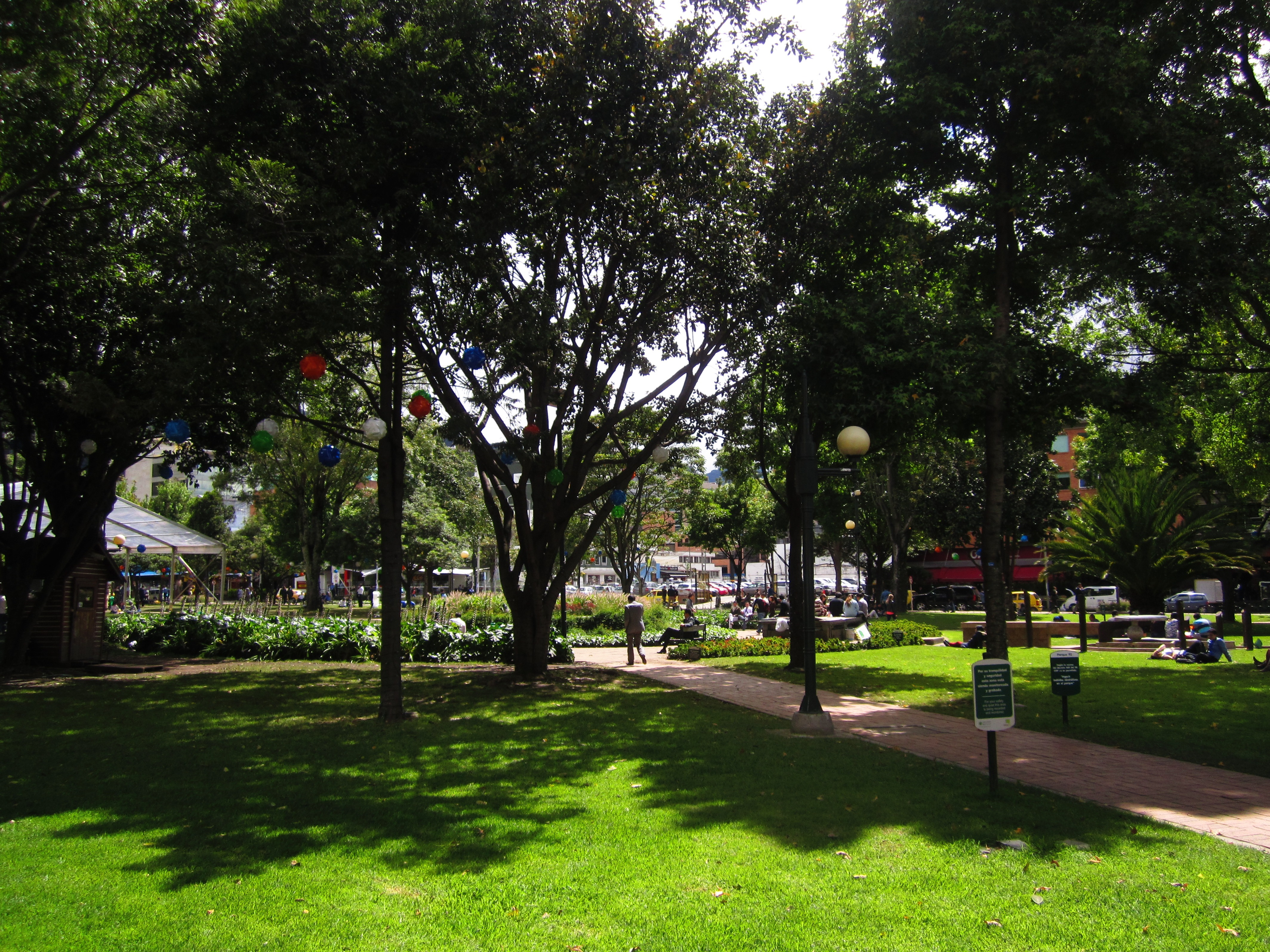
93 Park

Chapinero is one of the most important commercial and economic zones of the capital city. Banking and financial centers are headquartered along Calle 72, Carrera 7 and Calle 100 with major shopping areas located along Carreras 11 and 15. Several universities are based in the locality, including the Pontificia Universidad Javeriana, Catholic University of Colombia, Universidad Piloto de Colombia, and the National Pedagogic University.

The zone also includes popular dining areas and nightlife centers, which include the Zona Rosa, the Parque de la 93, and the Zona G; the last one known for its wide offer of upscale restaurants (G stands for Gourmet).

Chapinero is also the center of Bogotá's gay community. There are more than 100 bars, discos and clubs that cater to the gay community in Bogotá, many of which can be found in Chapinero. The biggest and most popular gay disco in Bogotá, Theatron, is located in the heart of Chapinero. Furthermore, the former mayor of Chapinero, Blanca Inés Durán Hernández, is openly lesbian. The locality has a unique community center focused on the LGBT population of the neighborhood and the city. It is the first of its kind in Latin America.

== Government ==
Chapinero is among the 20 localities that make up the Capital District of Bogota and thus has its own local administration that is under the jurisdiction of the District's Government secretariat. The current locality mayor is Hernando J. Quintero, appointed by the Mayor of Bogotá, Enrique Peñalosa.

For the 2015 fiscal year it counted with a budget of 26,053,160,000 pesos, about US$8,400,000.

== General information ==
=== Borders ===
- North: Calle 100, bordering the locality of Usaquén
- East: the Eastern Hills, bordering the municipalities of La Calera and Choachí
- South: Calle 39, bordering the locality of Santa Fe
- West: Avenida Caracas and Autopista Norte, with the localities of Barrios Unidos and Teusaquillo

=== Points of interest ===
- Chicó Museum (Museo del Chicó), which includes an old manor house and a surrounding park.
- Our Lady of Lourdes Basilica (Basílica de Nuestra Señora de Lourdes)
- 93rd street park (93 Park; Parque de la 93), which is also a hotspot for upscale restaurants, bars and nightclubs.
- Shopping centers:
  - Avenida Chile, formerly known as Granahorrar
  - Centro Andino
  - Atlantis Plaza
  - El Retiro
  - United Church of Bogotá

=== Transportation ===
Major east-west roads include Calles 39, 45, 53, 57, 63, 85, 92, 94, 100, and Avenida Chile (Calle 72). North-south routes include Carreras 7, 9, 11, 13, 15 and Avenida Caracas.

The locality is served by TransMilenio lines on Avenida Caracas (Carrera 14) and to the west along the Carrera 30. All of the major roads have extensive private bus services.

=== Neighborhoods ===
Before 1955, the term Chapinero included some neighborhoods that are now part of the Teusaquillo locality and did not include the El Lago, Chicó, and Cataluña neighborhoods that are currently part of the locality.

Chapinero is divided into 5 units of zonal planning (Unidades de planeamiento zonal), which are then further divided into a total of 50 neighborhoods ("barrios") and an area on the east named El Verjón Bajo. The 50 neighborhoods are as follows:

1. Chapinero Alto
2. Chapinero Norte
3. Chapinero Central
4. El Chicó
5. Chicó Alto
6. La Porciúncula
7. Marly
8. Los Rosales
9. Juan XXIII
10. Bellavista
11. El Nogal
12. El Refugio
13. La Cabrera
14. Seminario
15. Toscana
16. La Esperanza Nororiental
17. La Sureña
18. San Isidro
19. San Luis Altos del Cabo
20. Bosque Calderón
21. Bosque Calderón Tejada
22. El Castillo
23. El Paraíso
24. Emaus
25. Granada
26. Nueva Granada
27. Sucre
28. La Salle
29. Las Acacias
30. Los Olivos
31. María Cristina
32. Mariscal Sucre
33. Ingemar
34. Palomar
35. Pardo Rubio
36. San Martín de Porres
37. Villa Anita
38. Villa del Cerro
39. Antiguo Country
40. El Retiro
41. Espartillal
42. La Cabrera
43. Lago Gaitán
44. Quinta Camacho
45. Cataluña
46. Chicó Norte
47. Chicó Norte II
48. Chicó Norte III
49. Chicó Occidental
50. Chicó Reservado

=== Hydrology ===
The rural Eastern Hills today are heavily forested, while until the 1930s were very much deforested. They are crossed by several rivers and creeks, many of which flow through the locality in man-made canals. Among the more important waterways are the Arzobispo River which joins with the San Francisco into the Bogotá River and the Quebrada El Virrey that forms a part of the Salitre river system.
