= Cartagena Botanical Garden =

Botanical garden in Colombia

Coordinates: 10°21′18″N 75°25′48″W

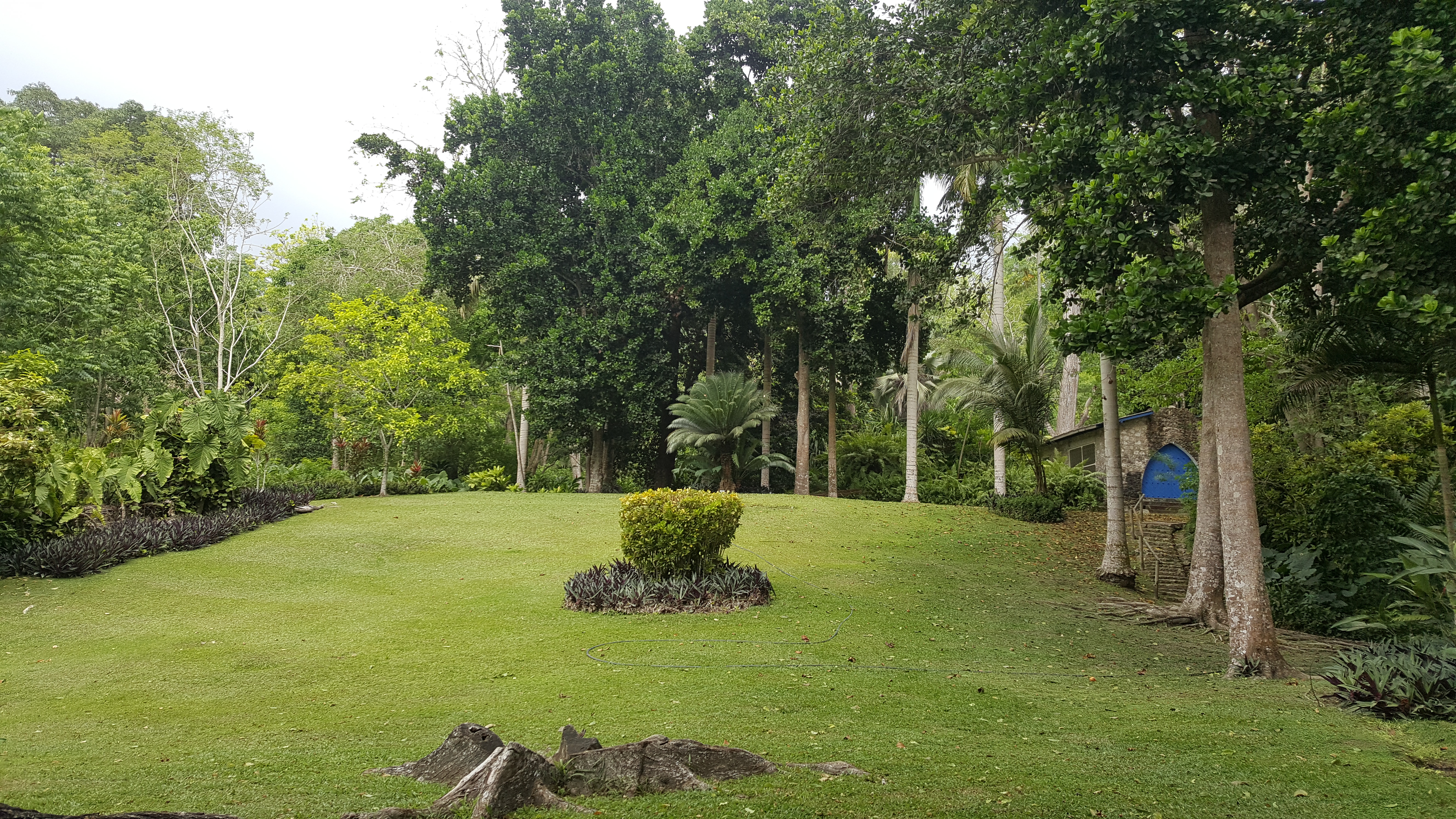
Recreation area within the Cartagena Botanical Garden

The Cartagena Botanical Garden (Spanish: Jardín Botánico de Cartagena “Guillermo Piñeres”) is located in the hills above Cartagena, in Turbaco, Bolívar, Colombia. It stretches over nine hectares, of which three hectares are natural tropical dry forest and six hectares are dedicated to botanical collections.

The garden lies around 110 meters above sea level and has an average annual rainfall of 1,239 mm. Rain falls mostly from late August to early December, with a shorter rainy season in May. A natural spring supplies the garden with ample fresh water throughout the year.

The garden is a certified botanical garden by the internationally known Botanic Gardens Conservation International (BGCI) and is part of the Botanical Garden Network of Colombia. It is recognized as a Science Center by the Colombian Ministry of Science.

== History ==
The Cartagena Botanical Garden was founded in 1978 with the donation of the land by María Jiménez de Piñeres, in honor of her late husband, Guillermo Piñeres with the purpose of protecting the ecosystem from future exploitation. With the support of the Central Bank of Colombia (Banco de la República) the Fundación Jardín Botánico “Guillermo Piñeres” was registered, and the garden opened to the public. The Colombian constitution of 1991 limited the role of the Central Bank of Colombia as benefactor of nonprofit organizations, and after a transition period, in 2004 the Central Bank was eliminated from its involvement in the Cartagena Botanical Garden. In 2004, the installations of the Cartagena Botanical Garden were left in commodatum with COMFENALCO, a family welfare fund, which to date manages the ticket office, events, gardening, and general maintenance of the Garden. The Fundación Jardín Botánico “Guillermo Piñeres” leads a research program focused on the study and conservation of the ecosystems of the Colombian Caribbean region and is responsible for the Garden's outreach programs.

== Germán Botero de los Ríos living collection ==
The Cartagena Botanical Garden displays a living collection known as the Germán Botero de los Ríos living collection. It includes approximately 350 native and exotic species, organized in themed gardens such as the evolutionary garden, araceae collection, xerophytic environment, ornamental garden, medicinal plants garden, palmetum, arboretum, orquidarium and Jacquin's garden.

== María Jiménez de Piñeres herbarium ==
The María Jiménez de Piñeres herbarium is one of the first herbaria in the Colombian Caribbean region, as well as one of the largest. It houses samples collected since 1978, by world known botanists such as Alwyn Gentry, Hermes Cuadros, and Santiago Madriñán, many of them from ecosystems that are difficult to access or have since been lost due to deforestation. The collection includes approximately 14,000 specimens.

== José Vicente Mogollón Vélez germplasm bank ==
The José Vicente Mogollón Vélez germplasm bank is a seed collection containing more than 450 accessions with 294.000 seeds of more than 170 species, most of them native to the Colombian tropical dry forest.

== Flora and fauna ==
Cartagena Botanical Garden has many well-developed specimens of trees, shrubs, and herbs. Large specimens of giant cashew (Anacardium excelsum), and white fig (Ficus maxima), rise above the forest canopy with their massive crowns and huge trunks supported by large buttress roots. The symbol of the garden is the open fruit of Spanish cedar (Cedrela odorata) a common species within the premises. Other frequent trees in the garden are caney (Aspidosperma desmanthum), estera palm (Astrocaryum malybo), wine palm (Attalea butyracea), gumbo-limbo (Bursera simaruba), cuipo (Cavanillesia platanifolia), trumpet tree (Cecropia peltata), shortleaf fig (Ficus citrifolia), mamey apple (Mammea americana), laurel (Nectandra turbacensis), Guiana chestnut (Pachira aquatica), majagua (Pseudobombax septenatum), Panama tree (Sterculia apetala) and broad-leaved mahogany (Swietenia macrophylla). Many of these species are used for their timber and are thus highly threatened in their remaining populations outside the garden.

The Cartagena Botanical Garden houses a rich fauna. Howler monkeys (Alouatta seniculus) are frequently seen and heard, and cotton-headed tamarins (Saguinus oedipus) are recently reintroduced into the area (see Research and outreach). Other mammal species present in the garden include brown-throated sloth (Bradypus variegatus), northern tamandua (Tamandua mexicana), red-tailed squirrel (Sciurus granatensis), Central American agouti (Dasyprocta punctata), lowland paca (Cuniculus paca), ocelot (Leopardus pardalis), crab-eating raccoon (Procyon cancrivorus), and tayra (Eira barbara).

The area is a hotspot for birdwatching with 282 species reported in eBird. Among noteworthy species are red-throated ant-tanager (Habia fuscicauda), scaly-breasted hummingbird (Phaeochroa cuvierii), golden-winged sparrow (Arremon schlegeli), turquoise-rumped parrotlet (Forpus xanthopterygius spengeli), lance-tailed manakin (Chiroxiphia lanceolata), chestnut-winged chachalaca (Ortalis garrula), keel-billed toucan (Ramphastos sulfuratus), glaucous tanager (Thraupis glaucocolpa), and black-headed tody-flycatcher (Todirostrum nigriceps).

A wide variety of reptiles and amphibians are found in the garden. Among the most visible are the yellow-striped poison frog (Dendrobates truncatus), iguana (Iguana iguana), Rio Magdalena tegu (Tretioscincus bifasciatus), and yellow-headed gecko (Gonatodes albogularis).

== Research and outreach ==
The Cartagena Botanical Garden conducts research regarding the propagation of native tropical dry forest tree species. It has a scientific plant nursery where germination rates and growth rates are measured, and propagation protocols are developed. The generated scientific information is applied in restoration and conservation initiatives in the region, such as tree plantations for the recuperation of threatened ecosystems. The garden houses a permanent plot in its native tropical dry forest where forest composition, structure and carbon assimilation are measured. Propagation protocols for native species with ornamental potential are developed and consultancies in native landscaping are provided. The garden also offers workshops to people of all ages and knowledge backgrounds in topics related to flora, fauna, and the environment. Several insect species new to science have been identified in the Cartagena Botanical Garden. A reintroduction program of the critically endangered cotton-headed tamarin is led by the garden's research team.
