= La Porciúncula, Bogotá =

La Porciúncula
- Barrio
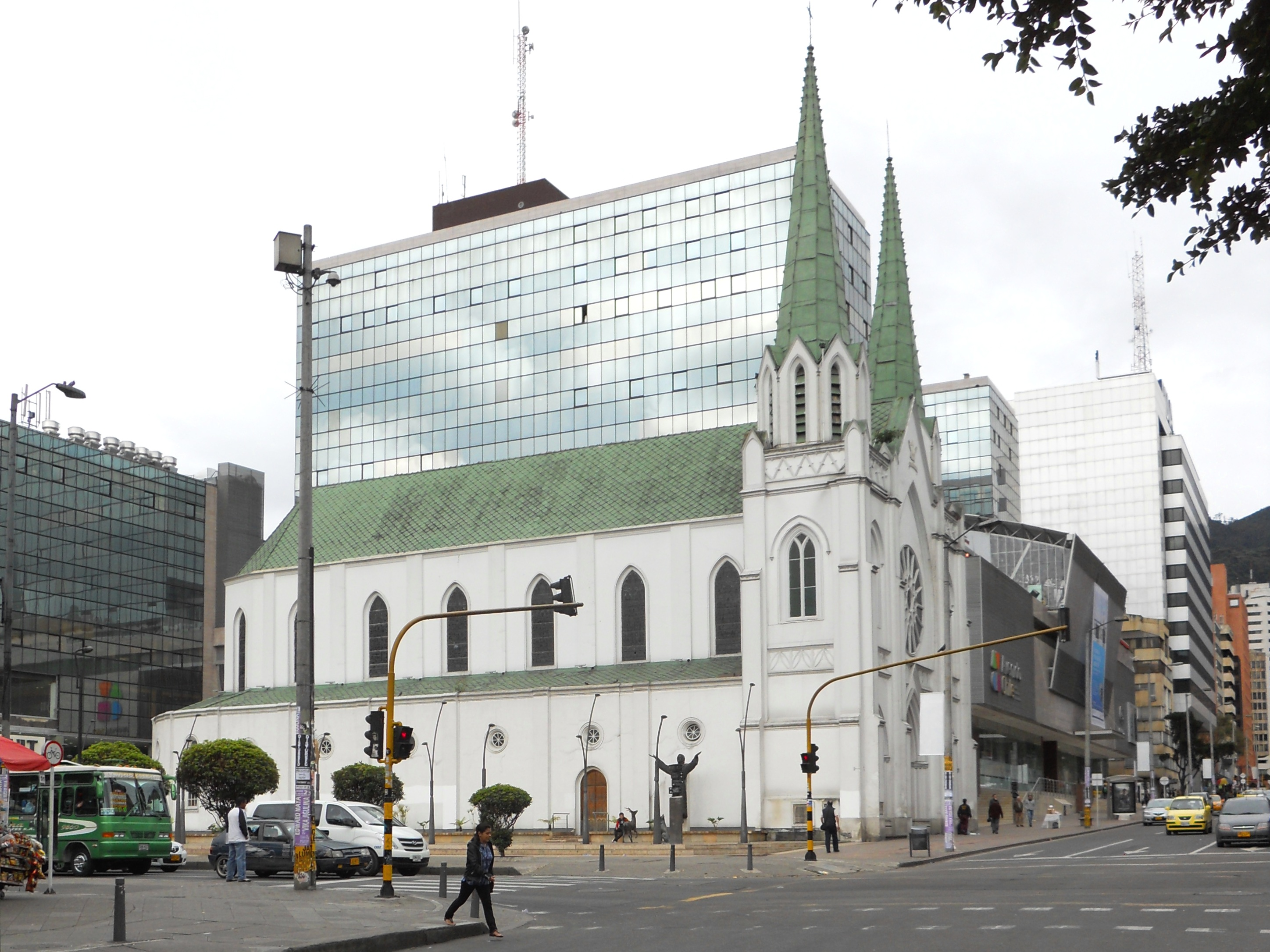
- La Porciúncula church
- Country: Colombia
- Department: Distrito Capital
- City: Bogotá
- Locality: Chapinero

La Porciúncula is a neighbourhood (barrio) in the locality of Chapinero in Bogotá, Colombia.

== Limits ==
North - calle 76
East - carrera 7
West - carrera 20
South - calle 72
