= El Chicó =

- Barrio
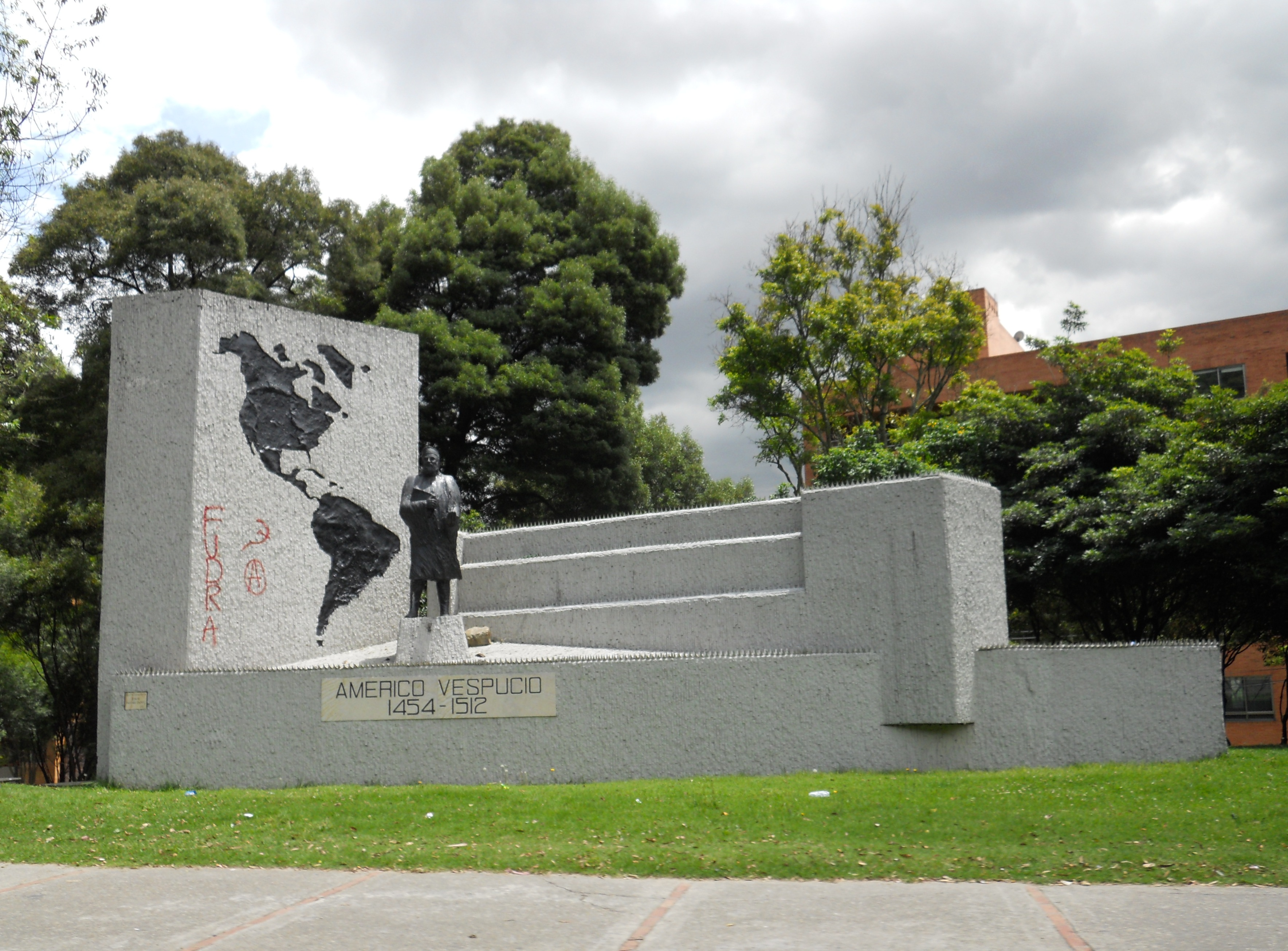
- Monument of Amerigo Vespucci on carrera 7
- Etymology: Muysccubun: chicú; "our ally"
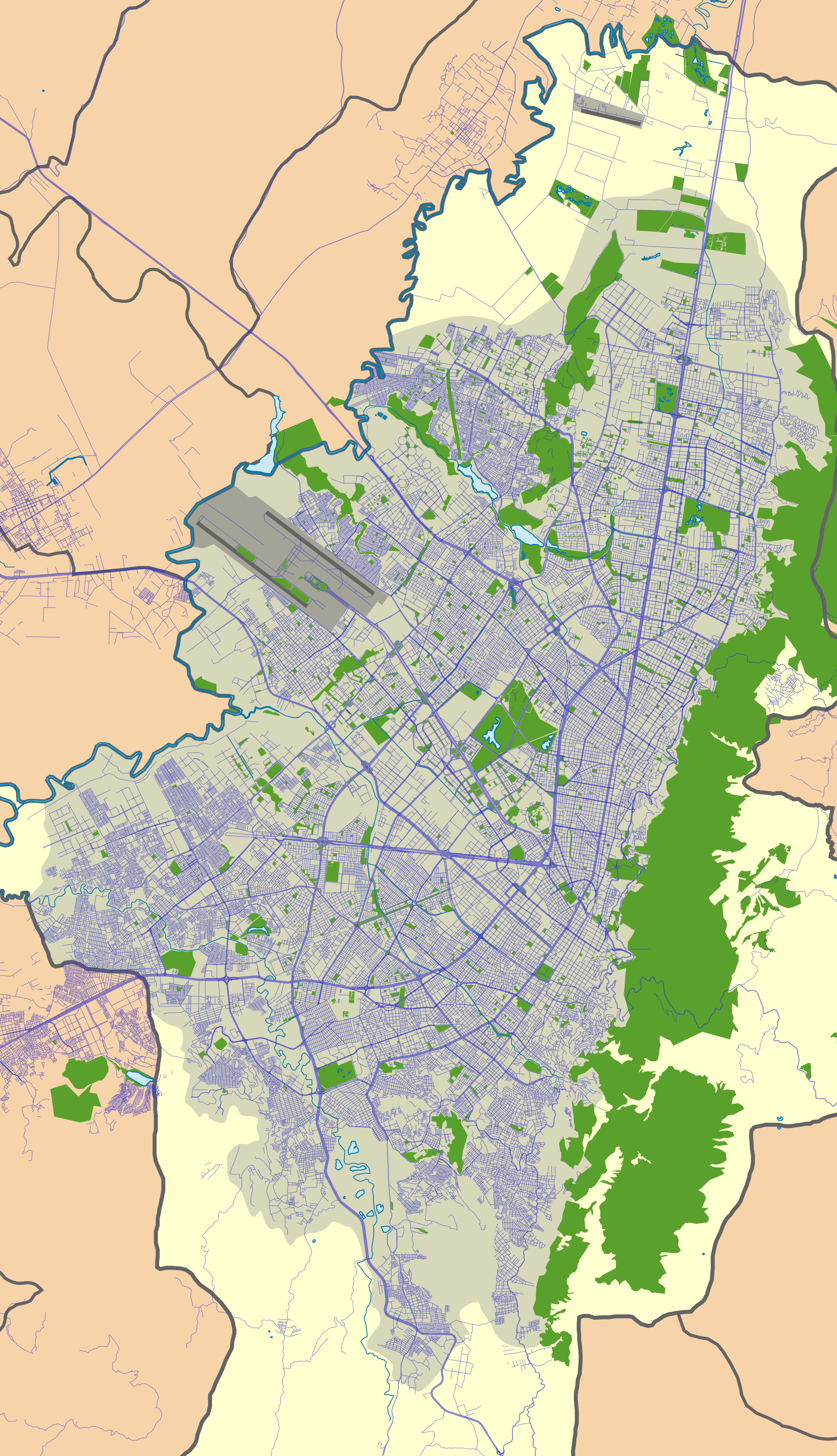
- Location in Bogotá
- Coordinates: 4°40′43.6″N 74°02′43.2″W
- Country: Colombia
- Department: Distrito Capital
- City: Bogotá
- Locality: Chapinero
- Elevation: 2,564 m (8,412 ft)

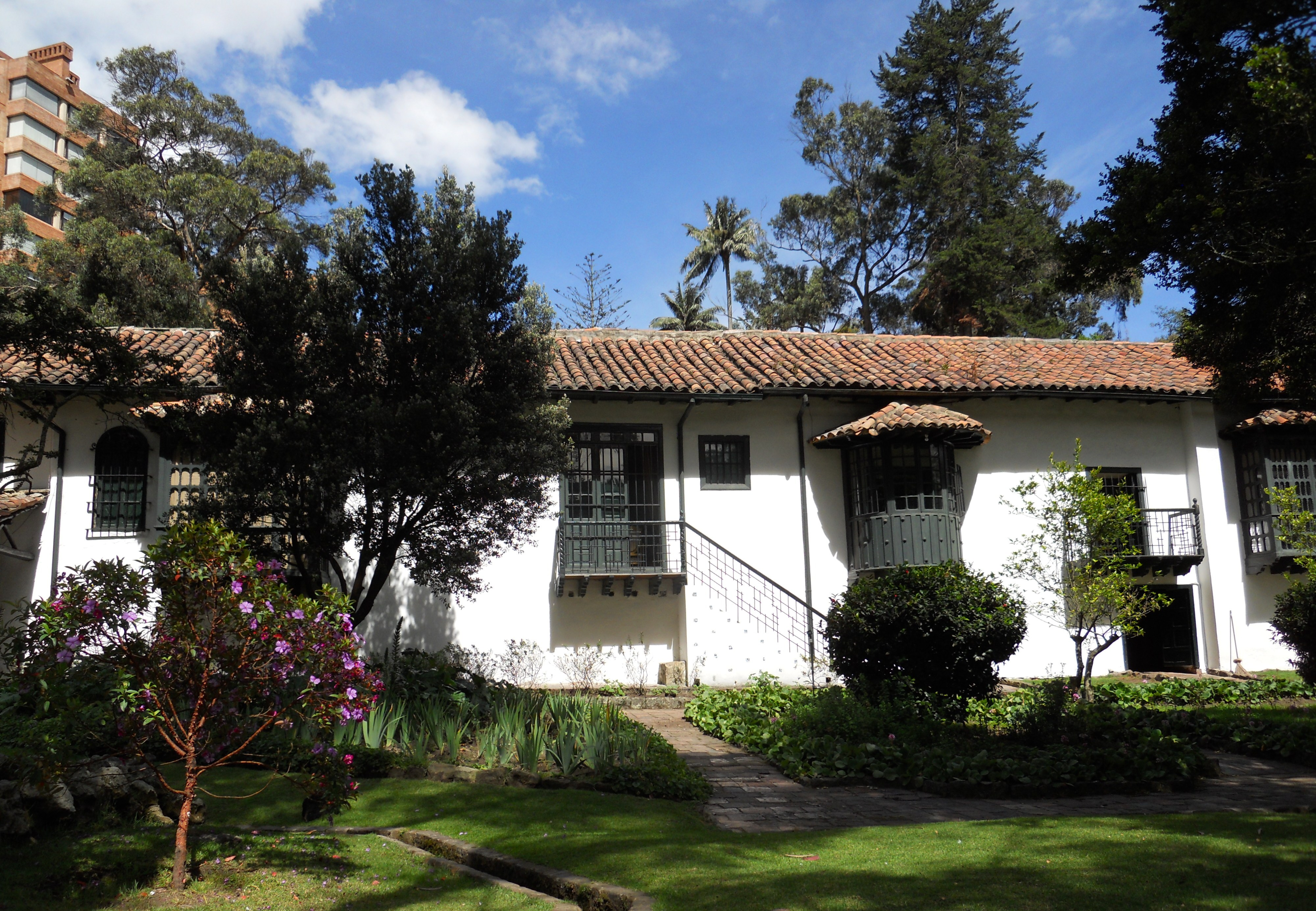
Museo el Chicó

El Chicó is an affluent neighbourhood (barrio) in the locality of Chapinero in Bogotá, Colombia.

== Limits ==
- North: Calle 100
- East: Eastern Hills
- West: Autopista Norte
- South: Calle 88

== Etymology ==
The name chicó is derived from the Chibcha word chicú which means "our ally".

== Tourism ==
El Chicó is home to the Parque de la 93, a park and restaurant area. It also hosts Museo el Chicó.
