= LGBTQ people in Colombia =

The initialism LGBTQ is used to refer collectively to lesbian, gay, bisexual, transgender, and queer people and the community subculture that surrounds them.

In spite of considerable legal protection for the LGBTQ community in Colombia (see LGBTQ rights in Colombia), LGBTQ individuals, in particular transgender individuals, are often subject to discrimination and struggle with gaining acceptance.

== Demographics ==
There are no complete statistical studies on the number of gay, lesbian, bisexual or transgender people in Colombia.

In August 2020, questions about sexual orientation and gender identity were included in the National Poll on Consumption of Psychoactive Substances (Encuesta Nacional de Consumo de Sustancias Psicoactivas, or ENCSPA). Because of the privacy level of this particular poll, given to randomly selected households and filled out by only one person in the household, it was considered a good opportunity for questions about LGBTQ identification. The results were that 98.78% of respondents identified as heterosexual, while the remaining 1.22% identified themselves as gay, lesbian, bisexual, or other. Additionally, 51.86% identified as women and 48.07% as men, while the remaining 0.05% identified themselves as transgender and 0.02% as other. A spokesperson for the human rights organization Dejusticia said these numbers appear very low compared to studies in other countries and may be skewed by the respondents' fear of discrimination.

== History ==
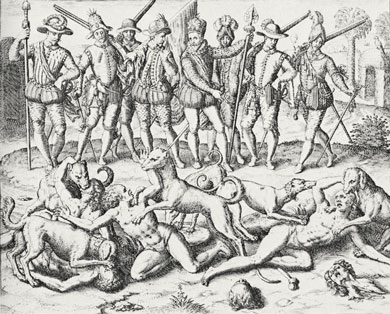
Balboa setting his war dogs upon Indigenous men who expressed male love

=== Early Modern period ===
In 1513, Spanish conquistador Vasco Núñez de Balboa killed a group of Native Americans near the Darién Gap, allegedly due to their engagement in same-sex relationships.

"The soldiers also took some prisoners, among whom they found several local men dressed in women's clothing. They inquired about it and confirmed that they were indeed men acting like women. They were bardajes (patient sodomites), a widespread cultural norm on the isthmus, but the Spanish of the time, poorly versed in anthropology, a science that did not develop until the 19th century, branded them "sodomites." Since homosexuality was punishable by death in Castile, they decided to carry out the sentence immediately and brutally, burning the prisoners alive. Enciso would later explain with satisfaction: "When I took Darién, we captured the sodomites and burned them, and when the women saw them, they were very happy." This observation is quite questionable, since women's respect for bardajes is well known, as they often acted as foremen directing women's work. However, the Spanish were not in the mood for subtle anthropological relativisms."

In 1514, Historia General y Natural de las Indias, one of the earliest written accounts of the Americas, reported that homosexuality as relatively common among Indigenous peoples in the territory now known as Colombia. In 1610, the Spanish Inquisition established a tribunal in Cartagena with the authority to impose the death penalty for acts classified as sodomy.

"The people tried by the Cartagena Tribunal were mostly Africans, heirs to other cultures with little or no contact with the Catholic religion. These Africans and their descendants faced a cruel reality, having been separated from their geography. Furthermore, they brought parts of their cultures with them, secretly sharing them with other slaves. Any religious practice that deviated from Christian ritual was considered "witchcraft," so several Afro-Grenadians were judged as "witches," "sorcerers," and "servants of the devil." The devil represented one or more of these other gods, corresponding to what the West then called idolatry."

=== 19th and early 20th Century ===
Throughout the 19th and early 20th centuries, homosexuality was treated as a medical and psychological condition. Various experimental and coercive treatments were used in attempts to alter sexual orientation, including electroshock therapy, hormone treatments, and testicle xenotransplantation involving non-human primates.

=== 1970s to 1980s ===
In the 1970s, informal LGBTQ organization began to emerge in Colombia. On 28 June 1977, the Colombian Homosexual Liberation Movement (Movimiento de Liberación Homosexual de Colombia, MLHC) was founded by Manuel Velandia, León Zuleta, and Guillermo Cortés. This organization was the first political project advocating for the LGBTQ community in the country, composed of branches in cities across Colombia. Zuleta, who was later murdered in a suspected hate crime in 1993, also contributed to the early LGBTQ press with the magazine El Otro.

In 1974, the American Psychiatric Association removed homosexuality from the Diagnostic and Statistical Manual of Mental Disorders (DSM), but Colombian health authorities continued to classify homosexuality as a mental disorder in the national disease codification (CIE) for several years, until 1990.

Legal reforms started in the 1980s. In 1981, homosexuality was decriminalized in Colombia, ending penalties that had included imprisonment from five to fifteen years. MLHC held the country's first LGBTQ pride march and demonstration in Bogotá in 1983, with approximately 32 participants and a coningent of nearly a hundred police officers sent for crowd control.

In 1983, the first AIDS-related deaths were officially reported in Colombia. That same year, Manuel Velandia and Eduardo Moreno founded the Grupo de Ayuda e Información sobre SIDA or GAI (Help and Information on AIDS Group) to provide information and support regarding the disease.

Between 1986 and 1989, numerous violent incidents targeting LGBTQ individuals occurred in the country, attributed to illegal vigilante groups engaged in anti-gay so-called 'social cleansing' campaigns. Media sources estimated approximately 640 related deaths occurred during this period. Groups claiming responsibility included "Manonegra" ("Black Hand") and others operating under names such as "Amor a Medellín" (Love to Medellín), "Amor a Manizales" (Love to Manizales), and "Muerte a Homosexuales" (Death to Homosexuals).

=== 1990s ===
In the early 1990s, efforts to secure rights for people living with HIV/AIDS gained visibility. Manuel Velandia was among those who advocated for equal treatment in healthcare settings. During this time, media outlets reported cases of harassment (gay bashing), including incidents in Bogotá in which individuals were stripped, soaked with cold water and left on Monserrate Hill due to their perceived sexual orientation.

By the mid-1990s, support groups for individuals living with HIV/AIDS were established, along with the first organized support networks for lesbians in 1996. In 1995, psychologist Marina Talero created the first support group for transgender individuals in Colombia.

=== 2000s ===
During the early 2000s, legal efforts led by lawyer and activist Germán Perfetti resulted in several advances for LGBT rights. Court decisions extended social security to same-sex couples, granted employment rights for gay teachers, upheld employment protections for LGBT individuals, and recognized the right to legal name changes for transgender people.

In 2000, the first National LGBT Convention was held in Bogotá. In 2001, the initiative Planeta Paz (Planet Peace) was created to promote bisexual visibility. On May 1, 2002, a hand grenade was thrown at Velandia's residence, in the West Chapinero neighborhood of Bogotá. At the time, he was a candidate for the Chamber of Representatives of Colombia representing the Liberal Party and sexual minorities. Velandia later sought and was granted asylum in San Sebastián, Spain, with support from the Spanish Red Cross, The Spanish Commission of help for refugees (CEAR) and the GEHITU (LGBT association of the Basque Country). His case was finally presented to the provincial commissary of police in February 2007.

The Constitutional Court issued a series of rulings in 2007 and 2008 that progressively expanded legal recognition for same-sex couples. On February 7, 2007, it recognized property equity (inheritance) rights for same-sex couples having cohabited for at least two years and registeresd as a union in a public notary, due to the efforts of the public interest law group of University of the Andes. On October 5, 2007, the Court ruled that same-sex couples were entitled to the same social security benefits as heterosexual couples, and on April 17, 2008, it extended the same equality to pension benefits.

While these legal rulings were being issued, the Colombian Congress, which had been considering legislation to formally recognize same-sex couples, voted to discard the proposed bill during its final stage of debate in June 2007. Religious institutions, including the Catholic Church, publicly opposed these reforms. In March 2007, the president of the Catholic Bishop Council, Pedro Rubiano Sáenz, together with other ecclesiastic authorities, made press statements against the recognition of same-sex couples by the national government. On November 12, 2007, the LGBT community center located in Bogotá's Chapinero district was temporarily closed for a period of one month due to bureaucratic issues and a lack of funds. In December 2007, several transvestites were murdered in Bogotá's Santafé neighborhood. Media reports at the time indicated that monetary incentives of up to one million pesos (approximately 500 US dollars) were allegedly offered in exchange for each killing.

On April 17, 2008, the Constitutional Court ruled that same-sex couples registered before a public notary must also receive the same pension benefits as those granted to heterosexual couples. This decision, in combination with previous rulings, specifically the February 7, 2007 decision on property and inheritance rights and the 5 October 2007 decision on social security, established legal parity in these areas between same-sex and heterosexual couples.

On January 27, 2009, the Constitutional Court conducted a comprehensive review of the national constitution. The objective of this review was to ensure legal equality between same-sex and heterosexual civil unions and to amend all constitutional language that resulted in discrimination against LGBTQ individuals and couples.

=== 2010s to present ===
In 2010, the Office of Asylum and Refugees of the Spanish Ministry of Interior officially granted asylum to Velandia on the basis of persecution due to his activism.

On July 26, 2011, the Constitutional Court ruled that same-sex couples constituted family units under Colombian law. It directed the National Congress to legislate protections for such families by June 20, 2013. The ruling specified that in the absence of legislative action, couples would be permitted to formalize their unions through the courts or public notaries, with the same solemnity as marriage. On November 5, 2015, the Constitutional Court ruled that same-sex couples were eligible to adopt children, affirming that adoption agencies could not discriminate based on sexual orientation.

In 2018, for the first time in Colombia, the murder of a transgender woman, Anyela Ramos Claros, was prosecuted as "aggravated femicide". The perpetrator, Davinson Stiven Erazo Sánchez, was sentenced to 20 years in a psychiatric institution.

== Legal rights ==
Lesbian, gay, bisexual, transgender, and queer (LGBTQ) rights in Colombia have advanced significantly in the 21st century, and are now quite progressive. Consensual same-sex sexual activity in Colombia was decriminalized in 1981. In April 2016, the Constitutional Court legalized same-sex marriage, making Colombia the fourth Latin American country to do so. In 2015, Colombia granted same-sex couples the same adoption rights as heterosexual couples.

In 2011, Congress passed a law banning discrimination based on sexual orientation.

Between February 2007 and April 2008, three rulings of the Constitutional Court granted registered same-sex couples the same pension, social security and property rights as registered heterosexual couples.

=== Summary table ===
Same-sex sexual activity legal	Yes (Since 1981)
Equal age of consent (14)	Yes
Anti-discrimination laws in all areas (employment, goods and services, etc.)	Yes (Since 2011)
Right to express affection in public	Yes (Protected by a Constitutional Court ruling)
Same-sex marriages	Yes (Since 2016)
Recognition of same-sex couples	Yes (Since 2007)
Recognition of same-sex marriages from abroad	Yes (Since 2016)
Stepchild adoption by same-sex couples	Yes (Since 2014)
Joint adoption by same-sex couples	Yes (Since 2015)
Adoption by single LGBTQ persons	Yes (Since 2012)
Automatic parenthood for both spouses after birth	Yes (Since 2015)
LGB people allowed to serve openly in the military	Yes (Since 1999)
Transgender people allowed to serve openly in the military	Yes (Since 2015)
"Neutral" or blank space regarding gender on birth certificates	Yes (Since 2015)
Right to change legal gender	Yes
Right to change legal gender without psychiatric or physical evaluations	Yes (Since 2015)
Conversion therapy banned on minors	No (Pending)
Access to IVF for lesbians	Yes
Commercial surrogacy for gay male couples	Yes
MSMs allowed to donate blood	Yes (Since 2012)

== Culture ==
=== Art ===
Muro de recuperación de la memoria trans (lit. 'trans memory reclamation mural') is a mural containing the photos of 39 transgender murder victims in Colombia. The mural was installed in 2020 in the Centro de Atención Integral para la Diversidad Sexual y de Género in the Los Mártires locality of Bogotá.

=== Events ===
Pride marches and demonstrations are held annually in Bogotá (28 June), Cartagena, and other cities. Other events include:

- Flower Power is a party held every Sunday before a Monday bank holiday in an upscale location in the north of Bogota. Some of its proceedings go to LGBTQ-related projects.
- Sungay Party is a charity event to raise funds for LGBTQ-related projects.
- Del Mismo Modo, En el Sentido Contrario, Party from Círculo LGBT Uniandino.
- Fiesta Glitter. party from Stonewall Javeriano.
- Guacherna Gay at Barranquilla's Carnival.

=== Gay villages ===
Most of the LGBTQ-friendly places, including nightclubs, bars, and gay bathhouses, in Bogotá are concentrated in the Chapinero area, being what is known as a gay village. It houses the only LGBTQ Community Center in the country, which opened in September 2006, and is sponsored by the Office of the Mayor of Bogotá.

=== Literature ===
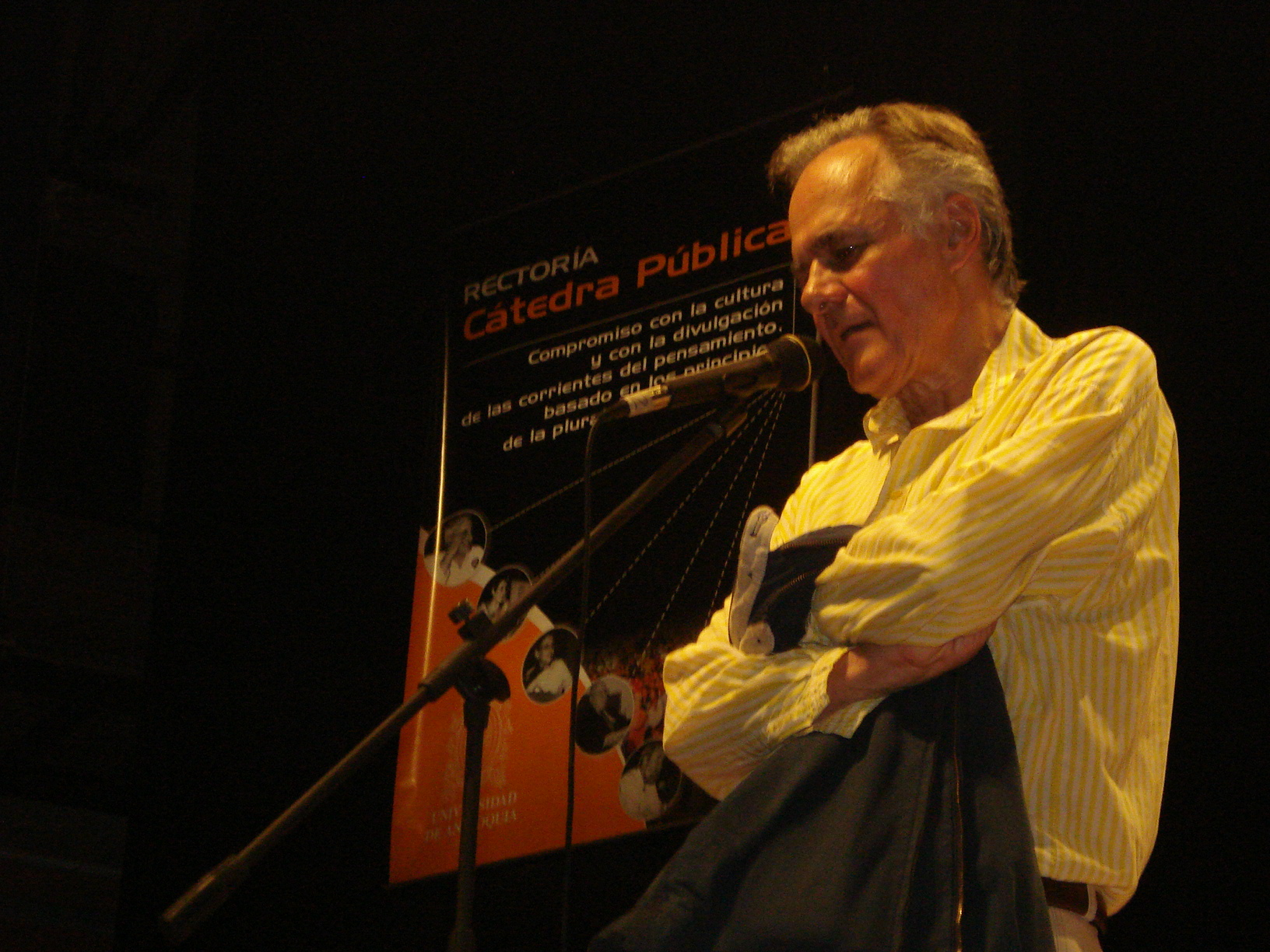
Fernando Vallejo has dealt with LGBT themes in several of his works.

LGBTQ literature in Colombia— defined as literature written by Colombian authors that involves plots, themes, or characters that are part of or are related to sexual diversity— dates back to the early 20th century, specifically to the homoerotic poetry of Porfirio Barba-Jacob. The first openly homosexual Colombian novel, Por los caminos de Sodoma: confesiones íntimas de un homosexual, was published in 1932 by Bernardo Arias Trujillo.

In later decades, some of the authors who have dealt with LGBTQ themes include Fernando Vallejo, with works such as La virgen de los sicarios (translated into English with the title Our Lady of the Assassins) and El desbarrancadero, and Efraim Medina Reyes with Técnicas de masturbación entre Batman y Robin. The most frequent literary genres have been short stories and novels, with male authors being more prevalent than female writers. The reflection of homosexual experiences is varied and conditioned by the geographical, professional, and social conditions of their protagonists. Various points of view can also be found, such as the ones mentioned by Giraldo A. (2009):

Posturas radicales, crímenes de odio en Cali, tema tabú en Manizales, y actitudes políticamente correctas en Bogotá. ("Radical stances, hate crimes in Cali, taboo subjects in Manizales, and politically correct attitudes in Bogotá.")

Moreover, Giraldo A. (2009) mentions that Balderston (2008) has pointed out the elements that are more trasgresores, lúdicos y eróticos ("transgressive, playful, and erotic") in the work of Porfirio Barba-Jacob, Raúl Gómez Jattin, Fernando Molano Vargas, Gabriel García Márquez, Marvel Moreno, Alonso Sánchez Baute, and Fernando Vallejo himself.

Acénto, the first magazine with an exclusively homosexual readership, was published between November 1997 and June 1998. It was managed by its founder, Fernando Toledo, and disappeared after eight issues due to the lack of advertisers who would be willing to keep it going, despite its having been a success in terms of subscriptions and sales.

==== Notable authors and works ====
- Alonso Sanchez Baute: To Hell with the Goddamn Spring (Al Diablo la Maldita Primavera), Free Us from Good (Libranos del bien).
- Fernando Molano Vargas: Dick's Kiss (Un beso de Dick), View From a Sidewalk (Vista desde una acera), All My Things In Your Pockets (Todas mis cosas en tus bolsillos).
- Fernando Vallejo: Our Lady of the Assassins, The Precipice (El Desbarrancadero), River of Time (El Rio del Tiempo), Roads to Rome (Los Caminos a Roma).
- Porfirio Barba-Jacob
- Luis Fayad: Esther's Relatives (Los parientes de Esther)
- Ruben Velez: Twentyfive Centimeters (Veinticinco centímetros)
- Juliana Delgado Lopera: Tropical Fever (Fiebre Tropical)

=== Media ===
- Miau Colombia: Miau Underground Collective. the first online LGTB television show in Colombia.
- Bogotárosa: Webportal, dedicated to LGBT community in Bogotá, Metro area and Colombia. News, guide, movies, music and general entertainment.
- "EL OTRO" (1970) published by León Zuleta was the first gay publication released in a regular basis in the country.
- Indetectable
- RumbaG portal
- Nemesis times magazine

=== Nightclubs ===
The Theatron in Bogotá is considered the largest gay nightclub in Latin America In Medellín, there is the Feathers-Splash. Barranquilla has Studio 54 and Sky Bar, among others.

== Organizations and resources ==
There are around 20 registered LGBTQ organizations in Colombia as well as some online and in person resources. These include:

- Colombia Diversa
- A number of Lesbian organizations: "DeGeneres-E", "Triangulo Negro" ( Black Triangle), "Lesbic Collective", and "Mujeres al Borde" ( Women to the Edge).
- Lambda project, an HIV/AIDS- related group
- "Círculo LGBT Uniandino", group at the University of the Andes.
- "Stonewall Javeriano", a student group by Pontificia Universidad Javeriana - Vicerrectoría del Medio Universitario - Asistencia para el fomento de Grupos Estudiantiles.
- Grupo estudiantil UDiversia, Universidad Distrital
- TRANS-SER Red de Apoyo a Transgeneristas
- Colombia LGBT: On-line guide to gay resourcesin the country

== See also ==
- LGBTQ culture in Argentina
- LGBTQ people in Chile
- LGBTQ people in Mexico

== Sources ==
- Balderston, Daniel (October–November 2008). "Baladas de la loca alegría: literatura queer en Colombia" (PDF). Revista Iberoamericana (in Spanish). LXXIV (225). University of Pittsburgh: International Institute of Ibero-American Literature: 1059–1073. doi:10.5195/reviberoamer.2008.5224. ISSN 0034-9631. Archived from the original on 19 July 2020.
- Giraldo A., Claudia Patricia (18–20 May 2009). Qué es la literatura queer: las compilaciones de literatura queer, gay y lésbica (PDF). VII Congreso Internacional Orbis Tertius de Teoría y Crítica Literaria (in Spanish). La Plata, Argentina: National University of La Plata. pp. 1–6.
