= LGBTQ history in Colombia =

LGBTQ history in Colombia refers to the diverse practices, movements, and ideologies related to sexuality and gender throughout Colombia's history.

LGBTQ culture in Colombia has existed since the pre-Columbian era, where gender diversity and sexual roles challenged the conventional gender binary. Cultures such as the Ticuna acknowledged people with unconventional sexual orientations, and pre-Columbian mythologies included intersex deities. However, the arrival of European settlers and the imposition of their culture and legal system had a significant impact on the territory's customs and tolerance of gender nonconformity.

In the 20th century, clandestine movements seeking recognition of gay rights emerged in Colombia. Although significant progress was made, obstacles such as discrimination and persecution (both legal and illegal) persisted. In the 21st century, significant legal changes have taken place, such as the legalization of same-sex marriage in 2016. Furthermore, the Colombian government has promoted measures to combat discrimination and protect the human rights of LGBT people.

However, the 21st century has also faced persistent challenges, including violence, hate crimes and discrimination affecting the LGBT community in Colombia.

== Gender diversity and roles in Indigenous society ==
Ticuna women in festive clothing

Prior to European colonization, pre-Columbian cultures in Colombia had a relatively fluid understanding of gender identity and sexuality and included roles and practices that challenged binary ideas of gender. For example, among the Ticuna, a prominent culture in the Amazon region, same-sex couples were respected and allowed to marry. Ticuna women, in particular, defend same-sex relationships as consistent with the clan's rules of exogamy and a strength of the Ticuna nations. In the Ticuna language, Kaigüwecü is a word describing a man who has sex with another man; Ngüe Tügümaêgüé describes a woman who has sex with other women.

Some surviving sculptures from Incan cultures depict individuals in various sexual positions similar to those found in the Kama Sutra. These sculptures mostly depict scenes of oral and anal sex, both between heterosexual and same-sex couples, while depictions of vaginal sex are rare. In these sculptures, the gender of those depicted is often ambiguous, since homosexual men were allowed to dress in feminine clothing and participate in activities considered feminine within society.

One of the deities in the Incan pantheon, known as Chuqui Chinchay, was represented as both masculine and feminine and was revered by non-binary shamans.

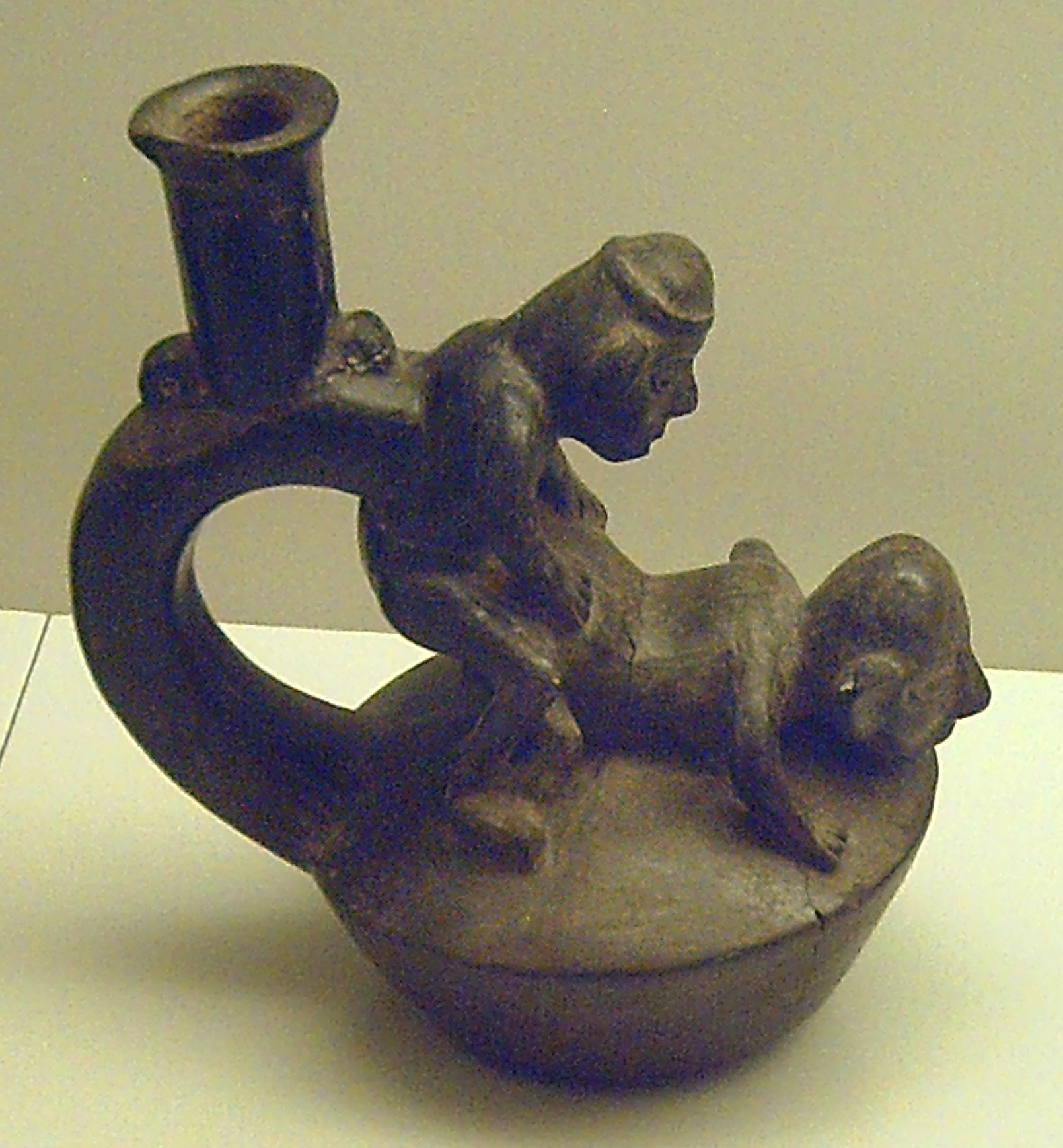
Incan ceramic sculpture representing anal sex

According to the chronicler Pedro Cieza de León, unlike the rest of the Inca Empire, the practice of homosexuality was tolerated in the region of Chinchaysuyo and even considered an act of worship, with a male brothel serving the needs of the troops. These sexual servants were known as pampayruna.

The Incas also had special regard for lesbians, whom they called holjoshta. The Incan Cápac Yupanqui often had a very special affection for these women.

=== Impact of Colonization ===
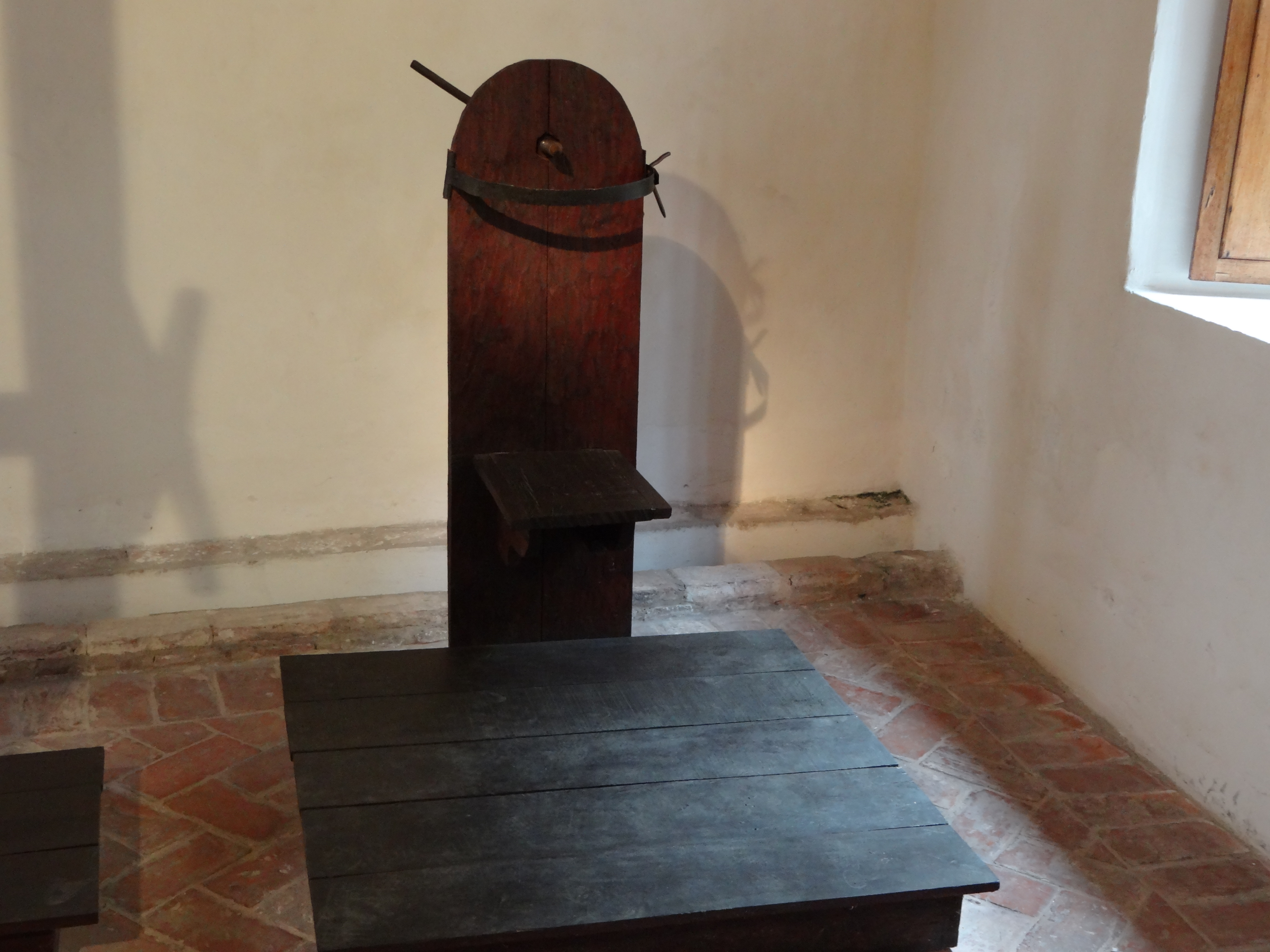
The garrote, an instrument of torture used by the Spanish Inquisition.

The arrival of Spanish colonizers in the late 15th and early 16th centuries brought with it the imposition of European morals and norms regarding sexuality and gender. The destruction of records by the Catholic Church and the repression of LGBT+ identities make it difficult to fully reconstruct LGBT+ history during that period.

The emergence of neo-Pentecostal churches brought about a change in marital expectations within Tikuna society. Same-sex relationships came to be considered sinful, overriding the Tikuna worldview with foreign moral values that emphasize the dominance of religion over Indigenous peoples.

In the late 2010s, cases of persecution, expulsion, and murder of transgender women by their own Embera Chamí and Wayuu communities became widespread, resulting in the dispersion of refugees to El Santuario.

== Treatment of Gender-Nonconforming Individuals in the 20th Century ==
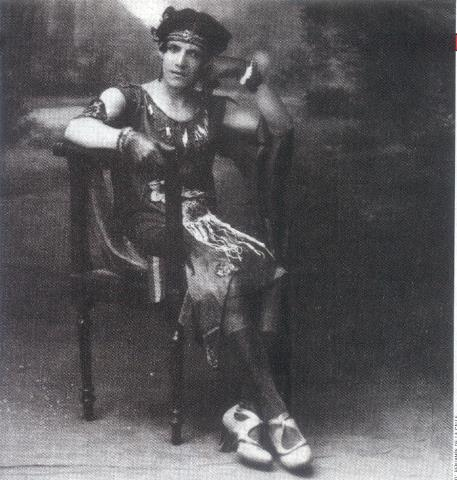
Portrait of Álvaro Echavarría El Excluido (1927), a famous transvestite from the municipality of Cúcuta: the first photographic record of a transvestite in Colombia.

Until the mid-1930s, people with diverse sexual identities and orientations had to hide from society because they were pathologized in Colombia. In 1936, homosexuality was no longer treated as a mental illness, but instead came to be treated as a crime.

In 1940, the fight for recognition of homosexual rights began with the creation of the clandestine group Los Felipitos in Bogotá.

Since 1960, the evolution of internal armed conflict in Colombia has led to a wide range of hate crimes, acts of torture, harassment, and murders as recorded by military, political, and paramilitary forces against the LGBT community. Guerrilla forces, such as FARC, have been among those responsible for these acts. These events have generated large migratory movements of Colombian citizens who have been forced to flee as refugees.

Despite the persecution of LGBT people throughout armed conflict in Colombia, numerous opponents of LGBT rights have spoken out against their inclusion in the peace agreement between the government and the FARC. Conservative and religious groups have argued that the agreement seeks to promote homosexuality and establish what they call a "homosexual dictatorship". Furthermore, despite legal advances in Colombia, homophobia remains prevalent in institutions such as the police and military.

During the 1970s, significant progress was made in the fight for LGBT rights in Colombia. During this time, León Zuleta organized an LGBT group in Medellín and psychologist/sexologist Octavio Giraldo Neira conducted pioneering studies on male homosexuality in the country. Furthermore, venues such as Arlequín, El Farol, and Yango opened in Bogotá, becoming socializing spots for gay men, albeit clandestinely. In 1976, León Zuleta and Manuel Velandia founded the Homosexual Liberation Movement of Colombia (MLHC). The following year, El Otro, an LGBT newspaper founded by Zuleta, was launched and became a platform for sharing information and experiences and promoting diversity.

In 1978, weekly meetings were held at the Emmanuel Mounier Library for nearly three years, giving rise to the Güei Liberation Meeting Group (GELG), a meeting and support space for LGBT+ people. However, in 1979, Decree 2277 was enacted, establishing standards for teaching and considering "homosexuality or the practice of sexual aberrations" as grounds for misconduct. Despite these difficulties, the LGBT+ community continued its struggle, and that same year, La Ventana Gay (The Gay Window) began publishing a magazine that helped give a voice to sexual and gender diversity. Additionally, photographer Miguel Ángel Rojas published the series Faenza, which became a symbol of homosexuality in national art and contributed to the visibility of the LGBT+ community in the artistic world.

The 1980s marked a period of significant change in the struggle for LGBT rights in Colombia. In 1980, homosexuality was decriminalized and removed from the Penal Code. Consequently, various groups emerged, such as the Homosexual Liberation Movement, the Gay Study and Liberation Group, the Landa Collective, and Heliogábalos, led by Guillermo Cortez, Manuel Rodríguez, and Leonardo Vidales. The first gay pride march in Bogotá was held in 1983.

During the 1990s, significant legal and cultural advances were made in the fight for LGBT rights in Colombia. In 1992, the first Colombian LGBT novel, "Un beso de Dick" (A Kiss of Dick), written by Fernando Molano Vargas, was published. In addition, attorney Germán Rincón Perfetti filed the first legal action regarding name changes before the Constitutional Court, allowing transgender people to change their names without major bureaucratic obstacles from the State. In 1993, León Zuleta, a prominent gay rights activist, was murdered.

== Developments in the 21st Century ==
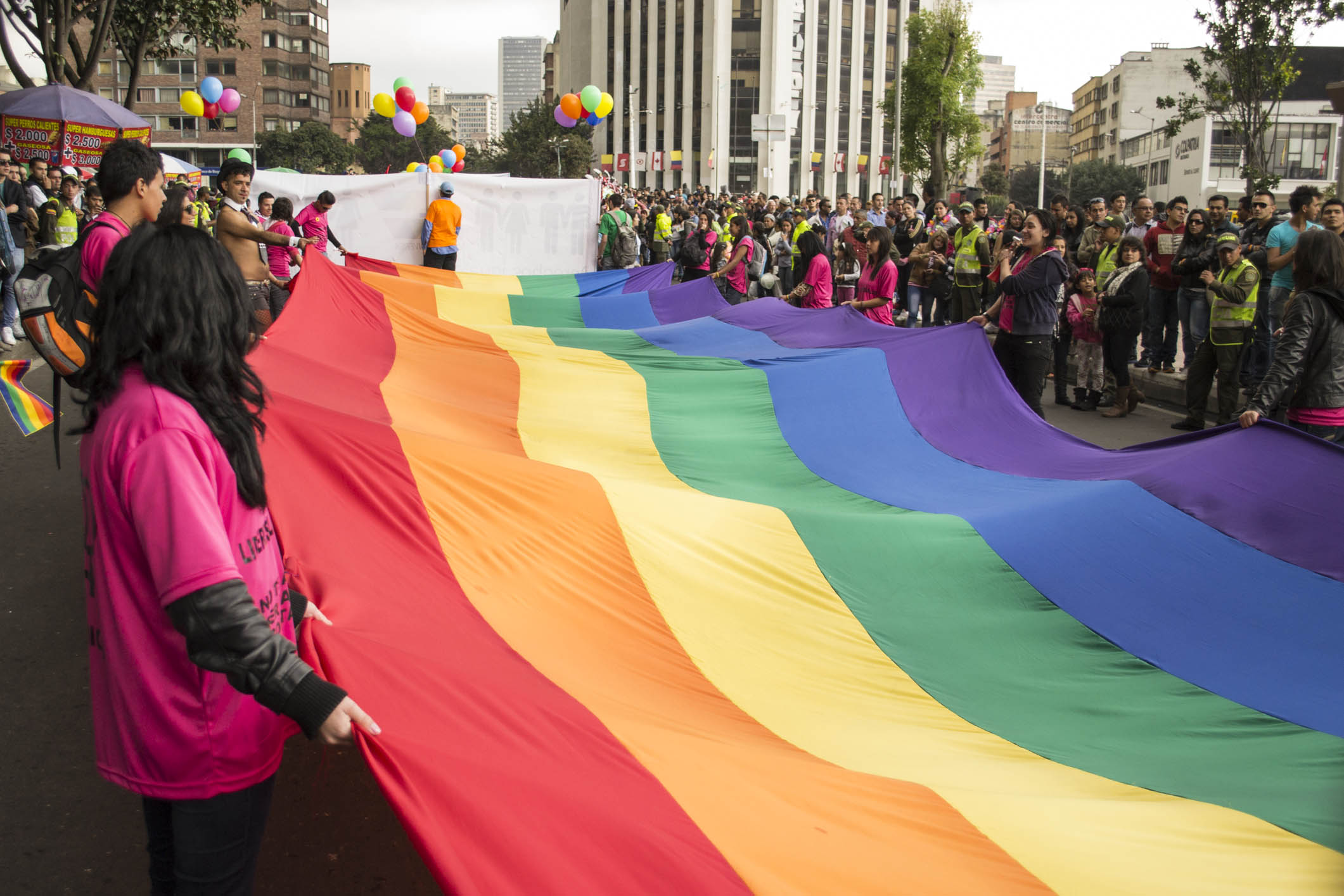
Pride march in Bogotá, 2013

In 2002, several countries, including Colombia, signed the Andean Charter for the Promotion and Protection of Human Rights in Guayaquil, Ecuador. This charter recognized sexual orientation as a protected category against discrimination.

Between 2007 and 2008, the Constitutional Court of Colombia ruled that same-sex couples have the same rights and obligations as heterosexual couples. This included recognizing common-law marriages between people of the same sex and providing legal protection for these relationships.

In 2012, the Constitutional Court ruled in its ruling T-248 that sexual orientation does not pose a risk to blood donation. In this ruling, the Court ordered the Ministry of Health to review current regulations and eliminate selection criteria based on sexual orientation. It argued that the risk of contracting infectious diseases depends on risky behavior, not sexual orientation. Furthermore, it emphasized that blood banks already test all donations for HIV, making it unnecessary to use sexual orientation as an exclusion criterion. The ruling also urges the Ministry of Health to train health professionals and laboratories to conduct surveys and interviews with potential donors regardless of their sexual orientation.

On November 5, 2015, the Colombian Constitutional Court issued a landmark ruling allowing same-sex couples to adopt children. In its ruling, the Court established that adoption agencies could not discriminate against LGBT couples during the adoption process.

On April 28, 2016, Colombia's Constitutional Court issued a landmark ruling allowing same-sex marriage in the country. This decision guaranteed that same-sex couples had the right to marry and access all the associated legal benefits and responsibilities.

In 2022, Jeison Vásquez Borja, a journalist and LGBT activist, was murdered in Medellín. The city's mayor, Daniel Quintero, condemned the incident and offered a reward for information leading to the killers' arrest.

In 2023, the head Colombian National Police, Henry Sanabria, was removed from his high position due to sexist, homophobic, and ultra-religious comments made during a televised interview.
