= LGBTQ literature in Colombia =

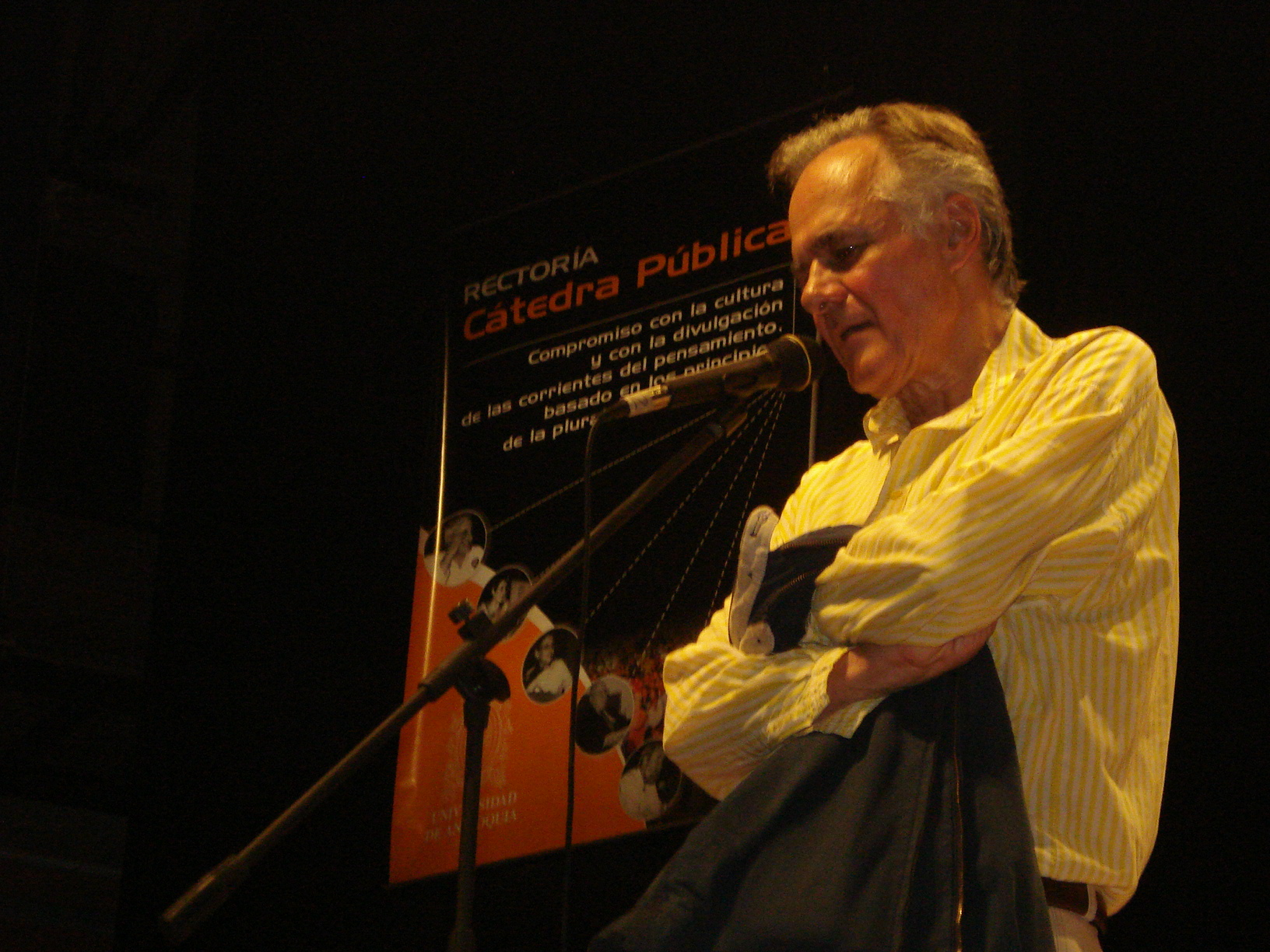
Fernando Vallejo has dealt with LGBT themes in several of his works.

LGBTQ literature in Colombia— defined as literature written by Colombian authors that involves plots, themes, or characters that are part of or are related to sexual diversity— dates back to the early 20th century, specifically to the homoerotic poetry of Porfirio Barba-Jacob. The first openly homosexual Colombian novel, Por los caminos de Sodoma: confesiones íntimas de un homosexual, was published in 1932 by Bernardo Arias Trujillo.

In later decades, some of the authors who have dealt with LGBTQ themes include Fernando Vallejo, with works such as La virgen de los sicarios (translated into English with the title Our Lady of the Assassins) and El desbarrancadero, and Efraim Medina Reyes with Técnicas de masturbación entre Batman y Robin. The most frequent literary genres have been short stories and novels, with male authors being more prevalent than female writers. The reflection of homosexual experiences is varied and conditioned by the geographical, professional, and social conditions of their protagonists. Various points of view can also be found, such as the ones mentioned by Giraldo A. (2009):

Posturas radicales, crímenes de odio en Cali, tema tabú en Manizales, y actitudes políticamente correctas en Bogotá. ("Radical stances, hate crimes in Cali, taboo subjects in Manizales, and politically correct attitudes in Bogotá.")

Moreover, Giraldo A. (2009) mentions that Balderston (2008) has pointed out the elements that are more trasgresores, lúdicos y eróticos ("transgressive, playful, and erotic") in the work of Porfirio Barba-Jacob, Raúl Gómez Jattin, Fernando Molano Vargas, Gabriel García Márquez, Marvel Moreno, Alonso Sánchez Baute, and Fernando Vallejo himself.

Acénto, the first magazine with an exclusively homosexual readership, was published between November 1997 and June 1998. It was managed by its founder, Fernando Toledo, and disappeared after eight issues due to the lack of advertisers who would be willing to keep it going, despite its having been a success in terms of subscriptions and sales.

== Narrative ==
=== 20th century ===
The first Colombian novel to deal openly with LGBT themes was Por los caminos de Sodoma: confesiones íntimas de un homosexual, published in Buenos Aires in 1932 by Bernardo Arias Trujillo. Arias published the novel under the pseudonym Sir Edgar Dixon. Although it was rejected at the time because of its subject matter, it is nowadays considered a landmark in Latin American LGBT literature.

Gabriel García Márquez's debut novella La hojarasca (1953) (translated into English with the title Leaf Storm) was the next narrative work to include an LGBT character, after Por los caminos de Sodoma. In the novel, the character of the boy displays a homoerotic desire for his friend Abraham, with whom he spends much of his free time. As evidence of this interpretation, scholars such as Daniel Balderston have particularly pointed to the end of chapter four, which Balderston describes as a franca escena de deseo homoerótico ("a clear display of homoerotic desire") and where the boy remarks, thinking of Abraham's naked body:

Quiero ir solo con Abraham, para verle el brillo del vientre cuando se zambulle y vuelve a surgir como un pez metálico. Toda la noche he deseado regresar con él, solo por la oscuridad del túnel verde, para rozarle el muslo cuando caminemos. Siempre que lo hago siento como si alguien me mordiera con unos mordiscos suaves, que me erizan la piel. ("I want to go alone with Abraham, to see the shine of his stomach when he dives and comes up again like a metal fish. All night long I've wanted to go back with him, alone in the darkness of the green tunnel, to brush his thigh as we walk along. Whenever I do that I feel as if someone is biting me with soft nibbles and my skin creeps." Translation by Gregory Rabassa)

In later decades, the novel Te quiero mucho, poquito, nada, by Félix Ángel, is worthy of mentioning. It was published in 1975 but was quickly withdrawn from bookstores due to its daring and transgressive nature.

The novel El divino, by Gustavo Álvarez Gardeazábal, was published in 1985. It had quite an impact, as it dealt with delicate issues such as drug trafficking and homosexuality, and was later adapted into a telenovela by Caracol Televisión. Apart from his literary work, Álvarez Gardeazábal is a well-known defender of gay rights in Colombia.

Fernando Vallejo's autobiographical work El fuego secreto was published in 1987. In it, he explores the issues of drug use and homosexuality as an adolescent in the cities of Medellín and Bogotá. It is the second book in his five-book autobiographical series El río del tiempo, which also includes: Los días azules (1985), about his childhood; Los caminos a Roma (1988) and Años de indulgencia (1989), in which he tells of his experiences in Europe and New York; and Entre fantasmas (1993), about the time he lived in Mexico City with his partner until 2018, when he returned to Colombia after the latter's death. Recurrent themes in most of his work include violence, homosexuality, adolescence, drugs, death, and the defense of animal rights.

The 1990s also saw the appearance of author Fernando Molano Vargas, who published the works Un beso de Dick (1992), his debut novel; the collection of poems Todas mis cosas en tus bolsillos (1997), published just a few months before his death; and Vista desde una acera (2012), published posthumously.

=== 21st century ===
Some authors who stand out in the 21st century include:

- Alonso Sánchez Baute: Al diablo la maldita primavera (2003).
- César Alzate Vargas: the novels La ciudad de todos los adioses (2001), Mártires del deseo (2007), and La familia perfecta (2014), and some short stories from the volume Medellinenses (2009).
- Gonzalo García Valdivieso: his autobiography Los putos castos. Memorias inconfesables de un doble deseo. (2011).
- Laura Restrepo: Delirio (2004) translated into English as Delirium.
- Jorge Franco: Melodrama (2006).
- Jaime Manrique: novels, poetry collections, and books of short stories. He has been considered by Ilan Stavans of The Washington Post as "The most accomplished gay Latino writer of his generation."
- Manuel Valdivieso: his first novel, Los hombres no van juntos a cine (2014), is about a love affair between two teenagers in Cúcuta, the author's hometown, in which he describes the intolerance caused by a culture influenced by paramilitaries and drug traffickers.

== Poetry ==
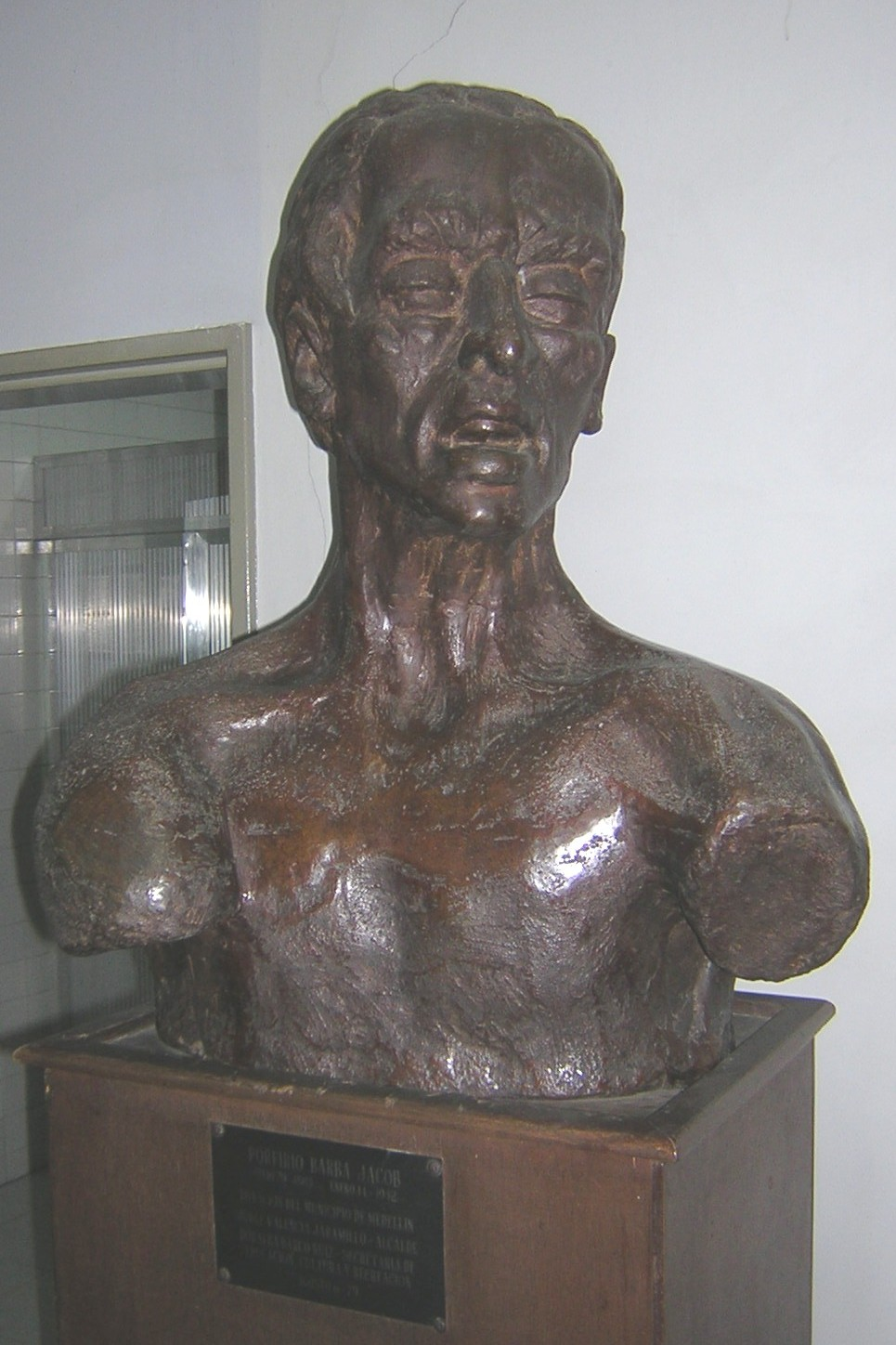
Bust of Porfirio Barba-Jacob.

Poet Porfirio Barba-Jacob lived his homosexuality openly and wrote of love between men in his poems, many of which he wrote while living in exile outside Colombia, a country where he always had many followers and a great influence. Author Fernando Vallejo wrote Barba-Jacob's biography as a novel, El mensajero (1987). Moreover, poet Bernardo Arias Trujillo wrote the poem Roby Nelson, about the beauty of an Argentine boy. This poem became very popular and is still today an example of homosexual literature, not only in Colombia, but throughout Latin America.

The ones who stand out among the more modern poets are Raúl Gómez Jattin and John Better.

== Theatre ==
The prolific work of playwright José Manuel Freidel repeatedly addresses homosexual themes. Among his plays, the monologue ¡Ay! Días, Chiqui (1987) stands out, in which he denounces violence against transvestites. Freidel was murdered in 1990.

== See also ==
- Colombian literature
- LGBTQ literature in Argentina
- LGBTQ literature in Brazil
- LGBTQ literature in Ecuador
- LGBTQ literature in El Salvador
- LGBTQ literature in Mexico
- LGBTQ literature in Spain

== Bibliography ==
- Balderston, Daniel (October–November 2008). "Baladas de la loca alegría: literatura queer en Colombia" (PDF). Revista Iberoamericana (in Spanish). LXXIV (225). University of Pittsburgh: International Institute of Ibero-American Literature: 1059–1073. doi:10.5195/reviberoamer.2008.5224. ISSN 0034-9631. Archived from the original on 19 July 2020.
- García Márquez, Gabriel (1979). La hojarasca [Leaf storm, and other stories]. Translated by Rabassa, Gregory. London: Pan Books. ISBN 9780330256889.
- Gil Gómez, Leonardo (January 2019). "Por los caminos de Sodoma de Bernardo Arias Trujillo, la homosexualidad inco(ó)moda". Perífrasis. Revista de literatura, teoría y crítica (in Spanish). 10 (19). Bogotá: University of the Andes (Colombia): 43–60. doi:10.25025/perifrasis201910.19.03. hdl:1992/28517. ISSN 2145-8987.
- Giraldo A., Claudia Patricia (18–20 May 2009). Qué es la literatura queer: las compilaciones de literatura queer, gay y lésbica (PDF). VII Congreso Internacional Orbis Tertius de Teoría y Crítica Literaria (in Spanish). La Plata, Argentina: National University of La Plata. pp. 1–6.
- Giraldo, Daniel (2016). Entre líneas: Literatura marica colombiana (PDF) (PhD thesis) (in Spanish). University of Pittsburgh. Archived from the original on 1 April 2022.
- Lúquez Fonseca, Jesús (16 November 2013). "Diez omisiones narrativas en La hojarasca". Letralia, Tierra de Letras (in Spanish). XVIII (292). Cagua, Venezuela. Archived from the original on 28 November 2022.
- Márquez Ramos, Eliezer (February 2016). "Un gay encerrado en Macondo". [IN]Genios. Revista de investigación y actividad creativa multidisciplinaria subgraduada. (in Spanish). 2 (2). San Juan: University of Puerto Rico, Río Piedras Campus. ISSN 2374-2747. Archived from the original on 13 October 2017.
- Rubio Rivas, Luz María (2012). Representaciones de hombres gays en la literatura colombiana (2000–2007) (PDF) (Master's thesis) (in Spanish). National University of Colombia.
