= LGBTQ rights in Colombia =

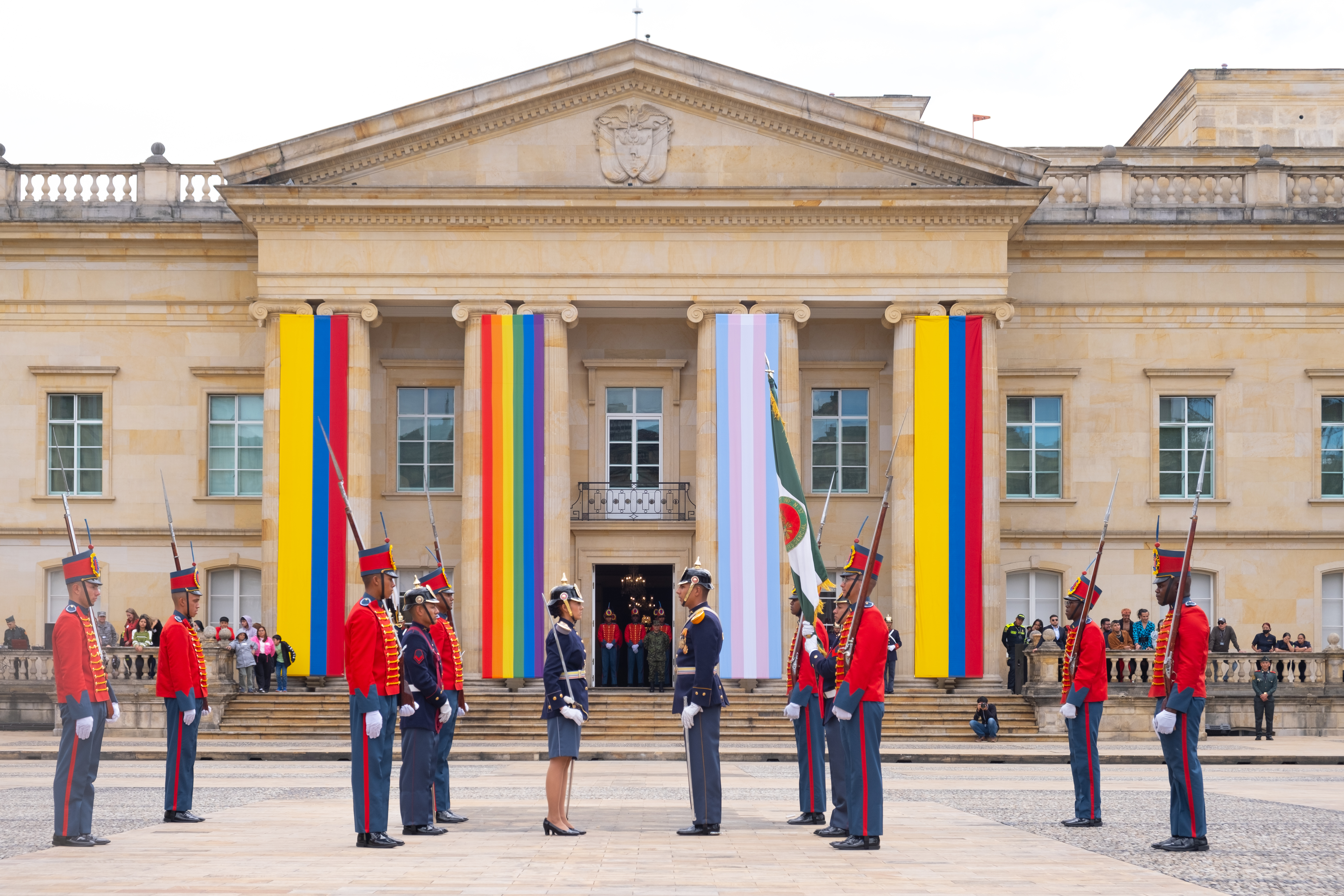
- Location of Colombia (top); Pride at Casa de Nariño in Bogotá (bottom)
- Legal status: Legal since 1981
- Gender identity: Right to change legal gender since 1993
- Military: LGBTQ allowed to serve in the military
- Discrimination protections: Sexual orientation protections since 2011

Family rights
- Recognition of relationships: Same-sex marriage since 2016
- Adoption: Full adoption rights since 2015

Lesbian, gay, bisexual, transgender, and queer (LGBTQ) rights in Colombia have advanced significantly in the 21st century, and are now quite progressive. Consensual same-sex sexual activity in Colombia was decriminalized in 1981. In April 2016, the Constitutional Court legalized same-sex marriage, making Colombia the fourth Latin American country to do so. In 2015, Colombia granted same-sex couples the same adoption rights as heterosexual couples.

In 2011, Congress passed a law banning discrimination based on sexual orientation.

Between February 2007 and April 2008, three rulings of the Constitutional Court granted registered same-sex couples the same pension, social security and property rights as registered heterosexual couples.

== Constitution and law ==
Article 13 of the Colombian Constitution of 1991 states that "the State will provide conditions for the equality to be real and effective, and will adopt measures in favour of marginalised or discriminated groups."

Article 42 of the Constitution states "the family is the basic nucleus of society. It is formed on the basis of natural or legal ties, by the free decision of a man and woman to contract matrimony or by their responsible resolve to comply with it".

Law reforms in the 1990s equalized the age of consent in Colombia at 14 for both homosexual and heterosexual sex. In 1998, the Constitutional Court ruled that public school teachers cannot be fired for revealing their sexual orientation, nor can private religious schools ban gay students from enrolling. In 1999, the same court unanimously ruled that the armed forces could not ban homosexuals and bisexuals from serving, declaring such bans as a violation of constitutional guarantees of "personal and family intimacy" and "the free development of one's personality."

== Recognition of same-sex relationships ==
On 7 February 2007, the Colombian Constitutional Court extended property and inheritance rights to same-sex couples, as a result of a constitutional action presented by the public interest law group of the Universidad de los Andes. The decision did not include pension or social security (health insurance) rights. In a second ruling of 5 October 2007, the Constitutional Court extended social security (health insurance) benefits to same-sex couples, and in a ruling on 17 April 2008 pension rights were extended. With these three rulings, same-sex couples in Colombia now enjoy the main benefits as heterosexual couples under the same terms.

These three rulings by the Constitutional Court replaced the defeated civil union bill that was rejected in Congress. On 19 June 2007, the bill, which would have treated unregistered same-sex partners the same as unregistered opposite-sex partners in law, was defeated in Congress. Slightly different versions of the bill passed in each house, and President Álvaro Uribe indicated he would support it. A compromise bill then passed one house (Congress) but failed in the other (Senate). The bill was defeated by a bloc of conservative senators. The bill, which had been endorsed by President Álvaro Uribe, would have made Colombia the first nation in Latin America to grant same-sex couples in long-term relationships the same rights to health insurance, inheritance and social security as heterosexual couples. However, with the rulings of the Constitutional Court, same-sex couples today enjoy the same rights that this failed bill would have given them.

In July 2011, the Constitutional Court ruled in a landmark decision that same-sex couples have the right to marry in Colombia. The Colombian Congress had to create an equivalent of marriage for same-sex couples by 20 June 2013, or else couples would automatically gain the right to go to any judge or public notary to formalise their union, according to the ruling. As the Colombia Congress failed to pass a same-sex marriage bill by that date, the courts instead began approving marriages themselves. The issue of same-sex marriage once again came before the Constitutional Court in 2015 after the country's Inspector General requested that the Court invalidate all the same-sex marriages approved in Colombia. A hearing took place in July 2015.

In March 2016, the first same-sex marriage conducted abroad was registered in Colombia and the National Registry issued a memo to all notaries and registrars ordering them to register same-sex marriages performed outside the country. Same-sex couples married abroad are now entitled to the same visa, healthcare benefits, inheritance and pension rights as heterosexual spouses once they take a stamped marriage certificate and identification papers to the nearest designated office.

On 28 April 2016, the Constitutional Court voted 6–3 in favor of same-sex marriage, holding that banning such unions is unconstitutional and discriminatory. The ruling effectively grants same-sex couples the right to marry as it orders all judges and notaries to grant the couples marriage licenses. The first same-sex wedding in the country happened in Cali on 24 May 2016.

== Adoption and parenting ==
In May 2012, the Constitutional Court issued a ruling in favour of the adoption of two children to the American, Chandler Burr, who was going to lose custody because the ICBF (the institution responsible for carrying out adoption procedures; Instituto Colombiano de Bienestar Familiar) considered that he was hiding his sexual orientation. Since then, the ICBF cannot ask about the sexual orientation of a person when they wish to adopt individually. Since 2014, LGBTQ individuals can adopt the biological child of their partner.

On 4 November 2015, the Constitutional Court ruled 6–2 in favour of full same-sex adoption rights. The court instructed adoption agencies not to discriminate against same-sex couples when providing adoption services. Opponents of the ruling said they would try to overturn it. By 31 March 2016, a campaign wanting to force a referendum on adoption rights for same-sex couples had gathered 1.8 million signatures, including 45 members of Congress. The campaign aimed to repeal the Constitutional Court ruling issued in November 2015. However, first, the signatures would have to be accepted by Colombia's Registrar, then the proposal would go to Congress where it would have to be debated and passed by a majority in both its chambers, twice. Finally, the proposal would have to also be approved by the Constitutional Court, the very court whose authority it sought to challenge. In May 2017, a Congress committee decided, in a 20–12 vote, to shelve the proposal. The move was applauded by President Juan Manuel Santos, who had previously announced his opposition to the proposal.

=== Legal registration of children ===
On 12 November 2015, the Constitutional Court ruled that same-sex couples must be allowed to register newborn children in both parents' names, with birth certificates listing two mothers or two fathers. In a 5–2 decision, the court gave the national civil registry 30 days to change its forms so that children can be registered to same-sex couples. The case was brought by two gay men who had been unable to register their newborn twins. The babies had been born in the United States to a surrogate mother and reportedly received US citizenship and documents but could not be registered in Colombia.

When parents report a birth, they must give the child a surname from each parent; they can choose which surname comes first. They are asked to make a good-faith declaration of their marital status, but as of 2026, they do not need to provide official documentation of their relationship.

== Conversion therapy ==
There have been efforts to outlaw Efforts to Change Sexual Orientation, Identity or Gender Expression (Esfuerzos de Cambio de Orientación Sexual, Identidad o Expresión de Género, abbreviated Ecosieg), which is a term for conversion therapy. Examples:

- On May 10, 2022, Congressperson Mauricio Toro proposed a law called "Inconvertibles". Congress debated it, but by 2024, it had failed.
- In 2025, Congressperson Carolina Giraldo proposed a similar law called "Quiérele siempre."

== Discrimination protections ==
In 2011, Congress passed a bill that penalises discrimination based on sexual orientation. The law established imprisonment for one to three years and economic fines for people who discriminate against different groups including the LGBTQ community.

The law also states that penalties are increased when discrimination is executed in a public space, when it is carried out through mass media, if the act is carried out by a public official, when acts based on discrimination deprives someone of their labour rights or in the provision of a public service. The penalty is reduced if the person who committed the act of discrimination apologizes publicly.

=== Discrimination in schools ===
In August 2014, a student named Sergio Urrego committed suicide as a result of discrimination by his teachers. His mother filed a lawsuit that after several appeals finally reached the Constitutional Court. The Court ruled in favour of Urrego's family, stating that the rights to dignity, education, equality, non-discrimination, the free development of personality, privacy and due process, justice, reparation and good name had been violated. The court also ordered the school to make a public act of forgiveness and ordered the Ministry of Education that within a year it review the "manuals of coexistence" (rules governing relationships between students themselves and others members of the educational community) of all schools in the country so that they do not contain articles that discriminate against children because of their sexual orientation or gender identity. With this decision, schools across the country cannot discriminate against students because of their sexual orientation.

=== Government decree ===
The Colombian Ministry of Interior released in the spring of 2016 a presidential decree that provides a broad policy of procedural obligations for government institutions and territorial entities regarding LGBTI rights. The document calls for creating an Intersectional Commission for the Guarantee of Rights of the LGBTI Community (Spanish: Comisión Intersectorial para la Garantía de los Derechos de la comunidad LGBTI). The decree specifically addresses rights for LGBTI Colombians in public education, health care, prisons and as victims of armed conflict. The text clarifies that "national entities may not refuse to recognize that a same-sex couple can constitute a family, and in consequence, can enjoy the constitutional protections and equality of opportunities afforded other families."

In May 2018, President Juan Manuel Santos issued an executive decree ordering the Interior Ministry to further guarantee the rights of LGBTQ people in the social sector, notably in health, education, work, housing, recreation, sports and culture, as well as establishing support programmes.

== Gender identity and expression ==
In 2011, the Constitutional Court ruled that a transgender woman prisoner was allowed to choose her own hairstyle and makeup.

=== Identity documents ===
People can request to change the gender marker on their birth certificate. The options are F (femenino), M (masculino), NB (no binario) and T (transgénero). Public notaries are not allowed to reject the request and must accomplish it within five business days. If it is the first time the person is making such a request, the notary cannot charge them for it, and the person can simultaneously request a name change free of charge. The change history is to be protected, such that only public authorities or the person themselves may consult it; anyone else will need a court order to look it up. This became law on July 9, 2026, when outgoing justice minister Jorge Iván Cuervo signed Decree 0732 of 2026. It followed the Constitutional Court's order on February 4, 2022 that the Ninth Notary of Medellín and the National Civil Registry reissue someone's birth certificate and national identity document with "no binario" or "NB" in the sex field. The court also ordered the Colombian government to offer the nonbinary option for everyone and ordered Congress to amend relevant laws.

Beginning in 2026, options for nonbinary and transgender will be offered on the national identity card.

Since August 2023, passports issued within Colombia have offered three gender options: male, female and X.

==== History ====
Since 1970, the National Civil Registry (Registro del Estado Civil) required a notarized, published statement, or a judge's ruling to change any information in a person's registry.

In 2012, the Constitutional Court ruled that a transgender person can request to change their gender on their civil registry records without going through a family court. Other Constitutional Court rulings in 2012 and 2014 allow name changes to be performed more than once.

In response to two rulings of the Constitutional Court in 2015, the Colombian Government issued a decree on 4 June 2015 to simplify the process by which adults over 18 can legally change their gender. The decree, signed by the Ministry of Justice and the Ministry of the Interior, says the gender change is justified by a person's individual choice; it eliminates the requirement for psychiatric or physical examinations. The trans group Fundación Grupo de Acción y Apoyo a Personas Trans, led by Laura Weinstein, advised the government on the law.

Notaries and local authorities sometimes believe they have discretionary authority to make their own rules, although officially this is not true. A 2016 report mentioned a pending legal case in which a person had been unable to find any notary willing to change their name without also changing their sex, even though the law allows this. The report, Cartografía de derechos trans en Colombia, was published jointly by OutRight Action International, El Aquelarre Trans, a transgender advocacy coalition, and El Programa de Acción por la Igualdad y la Inclusión Social (PAIIS), a program at the law school of Universidad de los Andes that researches and communicate information about human rights. This same 2016 report also recommended ending the psychiatric pathologization of transgender identity and abandoning sterilization as a prerequisite for other physical changes.

=== Organizations ===
Among the significant organizations for transgender rights are:

- La Fundación GAAT (Grupo de Acción y Apoyo a Personas con Experiencias de Vida Trans). The organization's director, Laura Weinstein, who had worked with the organization since 2009, died on 2 January 2021 after suffering sudden respiratory problems during the COVID-19 pandemic.
- La Red Comunitaria Trans. It was founded in 2012 by Daniela Maldonado Salamanca.

== Right to express affection in public ==
The Constitutional Court of Colombia has issued multiple rulings that protect the right of homosexuals and bisexuals to express themselves in public, including the right to express affection or love for their partners. In 1994, the court disapproved of the National Council of Television's refusal to show a commercial which featured a same-sex couple. This ruling was followed by others such as T-268 of 2000, where the court permitted a gay pride parade, which had previously been prevented by the Mayor of Neiva; T-301 of 2004, which ordered the Santa Marta police to stop harassing homosexuals who visited the boardwalk of the city; and T-314 of 2011, which held the Tequendama Hotel's refusal to allow access to some homosexuals to two events that were held in its facilities as discriminatory.

Sentence T-909 of 2011 ordered guardianship officials of Cosmocentro mall in Cali and its security firm to conduct a course to learn not to repress homosexuals when they express their affection in public.

== Military service ==
Men, regardless of sexual orientation, must register for the draft at age 18, upon which they receive a registration card ["libreta militar"] that they may be asked to present in certain situations, for example, when seeking employment (only public entreprises). Transgender women are not required to register.

=== Gender identity ===
According to a Supreme Court decision in 2015, transgender women do not have to register for the draft, but they may serve in the military if they choose.

=== Sexual orientation ===
In 1999, the Constitutional Court established that gays and bisexuals can serve in the Colombian military and that sexual orientation cannot be a factor to prevent someone from entering the military. Judgment C-507 of 1999 declared the military rule prohibiting "homosexual acts" to be unconstitutional.

As of 2020—according to Samuel Rivera-Paéz, the author of Militares e identidad—military culture still discourages discussion of same-sex attraction. There are politics of "se puede ser, pero no demostrar" [you can exist, but not show off], similar to what is referred to in English as "don't ask, don't tell".

== Blood donation ==
In 2012, the Constitutional Court found that one's sexual orientation cannot be a criterion for preventing blood donation. For this purpose, the court ordered the Ministry of Health and Social Protection to change the donation regulations, which established that men who have sex with men could not donate blood. The court ordered the Ministry of Health that regulations must be addressed to verify and identify high or low levels of risk according to the sexual behavior of the person and that sexual orientation is not in itself a de facto risk.

== Social conditions ==
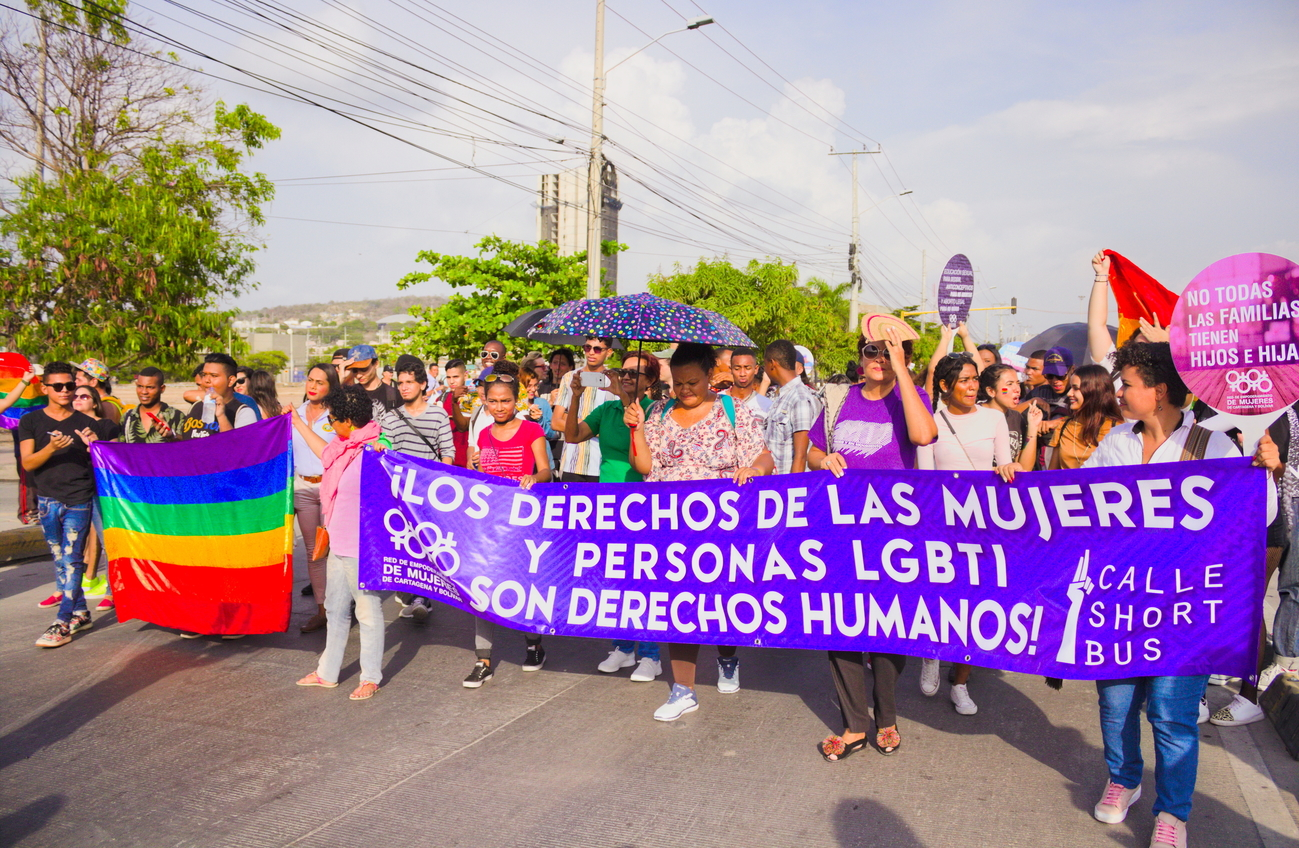
Demonstrations for LGBTQ rights during the International Day Against Homophobia, 2019.

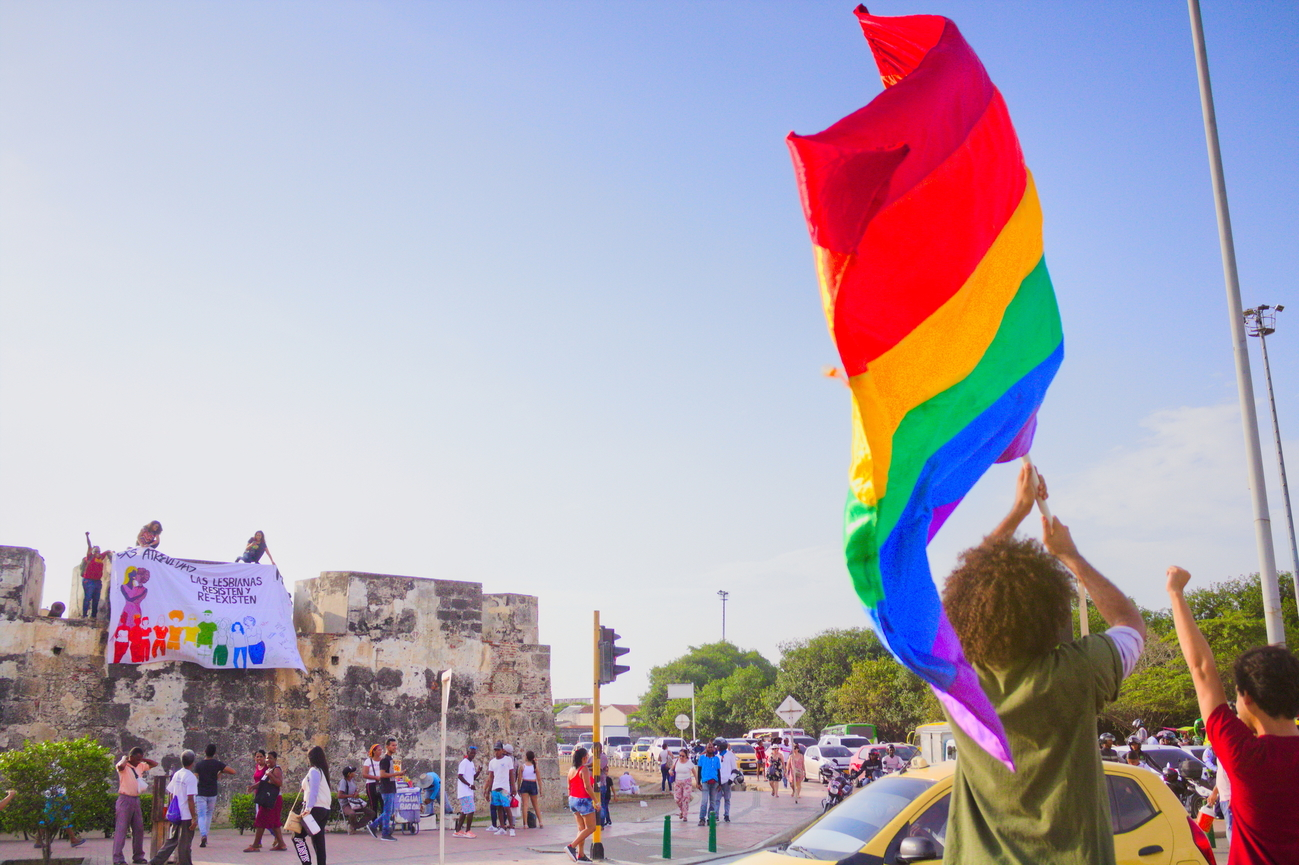
A rainbow flag on 17 May 2019 in Cartagena.

According to a report in The Washington Post, Bogotá and Medellín have thriving gay neighbourhoods, bars whose patrons are openly gay and centres that provide counselling and legal advice to members of the LGBTQ community. Local politicians, among them former Mayor Luis Eduardo Garzón and prominent members of Congress such as Senator Armando Benedetti, have supported granting legal rights to same-sex couples. Former President Juan Manuel Santos has shown support for LGBTQ rights, having two openly gay ministers in his government. Additionally, the mainstream media has a comprehensive coverage of the LGBTQ community. In the last few years, gay characters have appeared in more and more television programs and soap operas, especially a gay love scene in the prime-time soap opera Dr Mata and a lesbian scene in the series A corazón abierto. Despite support from the media, the government, several politicians, change in laws giving equal rights to homosexuals and transgender people and a more open debate about LGBTQ rights, Colombian society is still generally conservative on this issue.

In October 2019, an Invamer poll showed that support for same-sex marriage had, for the first time ever in Colombia, reached 50%, with 47% opposing. As for same-sex adoption, acceptance was at 36% and opposition at 62%. Previously, opinion surveys had found that a minority of Colombians supported same-sex marriage. A poll conducted between November and December 2016 showed that support for same-sex marriage was 37%, while 59% were against. Support for same-sex adoption was only 22%, while 76% were against. Another 2016 poll showed support for same-sex marriage at 40% and 57% opposed.

In May 2015, PlanetRomeo, an LGBTQ social network, published its first Gay Happiness Index (GHI). Gay men from over 120 countries were asked about how they feel about society's view on homosexuality, how do they experience the way they are treated by other people and how satisfied are they with their lives. Colombia was ranked 38th with a GHI score of 51.

In October 2019, Claudia López Hernández became the first openly gay person to serve as mayor of Bogotá, in an election labelled by the National Civil Registry as "the most peaceful in recent history". Lopez married Senator Angélica Lozano Correa in December 2019. In addition, two openly LGBTQ people were elected to Congress: Andrés Cancimance representing Putumayo and Oriana Zambrano representing La Guajira. Several candidates were also elected as local council members in Cali, Medellín, San Rafael, Pereira and more.

Several festivals and events cater to the LGBTQ community. These include pride parades in Bogotá, Medellín, Cali, Barranquilla, Bucaramanga, Cúcuta and Sincelejo, among others. Other events are the Rumours Festival in Cartagena, a music festival held in June, and Bogotá's Halloween Fiesta. Barranquilla's Carnival, one of the biggest carnivals in the world, includes a gay parade. Various other outlets catering to the LGBTQ community have been established over the years, including the emergence of new public-facing online publications such as OutinColombia.com and egoCity Magazine.

== Summary table ==
Same-sex sexual activity legal	Yes (Since 1981)
Equal age of consent (14)	Yes
Anti-discrimination laws in all areas (employment, goods and services, etc.)	Yes (Since 2011)
Right to express affection in public	Yes (Protected by a Constitutional Court ruling)
Same-sex marriages	Yes (Since 2016)
Recognition of same-sex couples	Yes (Since 2007)
Recognition of same-sex marriages from abroad	Yes (Since 2016)
Stepchild adoption by same-sex couples	Yes (Since 2014)
Joint adoption by same-sex couples	Yes (Since 2015)
Adoption by single LGBTQ persons	Yes (Since 2012)
Automatic parenthood for both spouses after birth	Yes (Since 2015)
LGB people allowed to serve openly in the military	Yes (Since 1999)
Transgender people allowed to serve openly in the military	Yes (Since 2015)
"Neutral" or blank space regarding gender on birth certificates	Yes (Since 2015)
Right to change legal gender	Yes
Right to change legal gender without psychiatric or physical evaluations	Yes (Since 2015)
Conversion therapy banned on minors	No (Pending)
Access to IVF for lesbians	Yes
Commercial surrogacy for gay male couples	Yes
MSMs allowed to donate blood	Yes (Since 2012)

== See also ==
- Bogotá Pride
- Colombia Diversa
- Human rights in Colombia
- Intersex rights in Colombia
- LGBTQ people in Colombia
- LGBTQ rights in the Americas
