= Alfredo Da Silva =

Bolivian-American artist (1935–2020)

- Born: February 20, 1935; Potosí, Bolivia
- Died: January 26, 2020 (aged 84); Alexandria, Virginia
- Education: Potosí Academy of Fine Arts University Tomas Frias; Prilidiano Pueyredon Academy of Fine Arts; Pratt Institute
- Known for: Fine Artist; Painter; Graphic Artist, Painting, Drawing, Photography, Sculpture
- Notable work: Space Time
- Movement: Abstract Expressionism, Watercolor
- Spouse: Joan Da Silva (m. 1965; div. 1987)
- Awards: 1961, Pan American Fellowship; 1963, Guggenheim Fellowship; 1964, Pratt Graphic Center Grant
- Website: www.alfredodasilva.com

Alfredo Da Silva (February 20, 1935 – January 26, 2020) was a painter, graphic artist, and photographer, known for his abstract expressionism. He came to international prominence in 1959 and remained so until his death in 2020.

== Biography ==
Alfredo Da Silva was born February 20, 1935, in Potosí, Bolivia. He studied initially at the Academia de Bellas Artes de Potosí, and then subsequently at the Academia de Bellas Artes Prilidiano Pueyredon in Buenos Aires.

Da Silva had his first solo exhibition at the age of sixteen, at the Municipal Gallery in La Paz, and he continued to show his work in both group exhibitions and solo exhibitions throughout Bolivia during the 1950s. In 1958, he obtained his degree as teacher of drawing and painting.

In 1960, Da Silva's work came to the attention of José Gómez-Sicre, then chief of the Division of Visual Arts for the Organization of American States (OAS). In 1961, Gómez-Sicre invited Da Silva to present a solo exhibition at the gallery of the Pan American Union in Washington D.C., organized by the OAS. In 1962, he won a grant to study Graphic Arts at the Pratt Institute of New York.

On Sunday, January 26, 2020, Da Silva was struck and killed by a vehicle while crossing the street near his home in Alexandria, Virginia.

== Artistic career ==
Da Silva was recognized as one of the historical "generation of '52" by the Bolivian National Museum of Art, in its exhibition Generación del '52: Pintura Boliviana del Siglo XX (Generation of '52: Bolivian Painters of the 20th Century). The name refers to the generation of artists whose work was profoundly marked by the Bolivian National Revolution of April 1952. This generation had two main artistic trends, the 'social painters' and the 'abstract painters.' Alfredo was part of the movement of abstract painters that did not accept social realism as the only mode for artistic expression.

In 1959, da Silva won first prize in a competition for foreign artists at the Salon National of Painting in Buenos Aires. In 1961 he represented the Pan American Union at the Biennial of São Paulo.

In 1963, the Institute of Spanish Culture in Madrid invited him to participate in the exhibition of Art of America and Spain. The same year he was awarded a fellowship by the Guggenheim Foundation for the period of 1963–1964.

In 1964, he was invited to participate at the II American Biennale of Cordoba, Argentina, where he won 3rd prize. In 1977, he participated at the II Biennale of Bolivia INBO, where he won the grand prize. In 1980, he was invited to the II Biennale Iberoamericana of Art in Mexico, where he had a show.

"During the 1960s, he continued to amass honors, including his Guggenheim Fellowship and a Pratt Graphic Center Grant, as his artwork attracted ever increasing attention and plaudits. Since then, he has participated in dozens of group exhibitions at such prominent venues as the Museum of Fine Arts, Mexico; the Contemporary Art Museum of Dallas, Texas; the Museum of Fine Arts in Helsinki, Finland; the gallery of the Central University of Caracas, Venezuela; the Institute of Contemporary Art in London; the Museum of Aberdeen, Scotland; and the Cultural Center of Villa Madrid, Spain. His work has also been exhibited in numerous one-man shows throughout North and South America and Europe and is in the permanent collections of the Coin Museum of Potosi, Bolivia; the National Museum of La Paz; the Metropolitan Museum of New York; and the Museum of Modern Art in Rio de Janeiro; to name just a few of the public collections that boast his works. His many prizes include the Grand Prize at the II Biennale INBO in La Paz in 1977"

Between 1974 and 1976 he worked for ABC TV.

Between 1981 and 1986 he worked for U.S. News & World Report.

Between 1987 and 1988 he worked for The World & I, a Washington Times publication.

Between 1988–present he worked for HJB Associates, 2228 South Quincy St. Arlington, VA.

On May 21, 2005, he was a judge for the Congressional Art Competition "An Artistic Discovery" in Washington Dc.

Between March 16 and May 17, 2009, his art was part of an exhibit presented at the Museo de Antioquia, in Medellín, Colombia, on occasion of the 50th Anniversary of the Inter-American Development Bank, and the celebration of the 50th Annual Meeting of Governors of the IDB.

== Comments by critics and notable artists ==
- In the book Art in Latin America Today "Bolivia" art critic Rigoberto Villarroel Claure says "Alfredo Da Silva was almost unknown in his own country until he went abroad and won the highest award for a foreign artist at the 1959 National Salon in Buenos Aires".
- In a Cable address on October 26, 1966, Dr. José Gómez-Sicre said "In my judgment, Alfredo Da Silva is highly talented as both a painter and graphic artist, and there is no doubt that he can be considered among the best professional artists in his fields in Latin America".
- In the book "Latin-American Painters in New York" Ernesto Ramallo (professor and art critic), from Buenos Aires, Argentina Describes Alfredo Da Silva and his work. "He is very young. His 24 years almost conflict with the maturity his work shows. We are far from thinking that painting well is a matter of more or less time, but still it is surprising to find him so mature. His works have everything, but everything in coherence, in unity. It is suggestive, yes, but it suggests the deep: there is nothing superficial or epidermic".
- Da Silva was close friends with a celebrated Bolivian sculptor Marina Núñez del Prado, who wrote about him in her book Eternidad en Los Andes — "his work is abstract, and gets us thinking in Tiawanaqu. He has all the telluric force and mysterious strength of the Andean nature."
- Artist, art critic, and cultural manager, Felix Angel describes his work in the catalog "50 years 50 works" "His production, based on a repertory of forms that alternate between the geometric and the organic, has always been rich in meaning. He has never been able to banish completely from his mind the hallucinatory images of the Valley of the Moon near La Paz, as attested in his work by the mineral-like sharpness of the draftsmanship and the labyrinthine intricacy of the total composition".
- In 1981, his abstract work was recognized by Teresa Gisbert, who described his work as being "outstanding for his treatment of surface qualities and his abstractionism."
- According to Babs Myer from the Times of Brazil, "Accepting 'abstract expressionism' as the label most nearly describing his art, da Silva works from a base of "intuition creation," expressing a world of intuition with rational shapes. He fuses the ancient past with the far distant future and creates a sense of time itself moving to the future or to the past, but always of one continuous whole. The circle is always evident, and one may recognize ancient Indian building stones, fossilized bones, or structures for man's use in some misty future in space."

== Style and influences ==
His early works were painted using vibrant colors. Growing up in Bolivia he was influenced by the Inca civilization. In 1958 he went to Buenos Aires and became very interested in his textural expressionism. Color wise his paintings were more monochromatic. He also spent a great deal more focus on texture and composition. In 1960 he started to receive invitations to have shows all over the world and his paintings began to grow in size and in detail.

== Exhibitions, prizes, and collections ==
=== Solo exhibitions (Bolivia) ===
- 1951 Bibloioteca de La Paz, Bolivia.
- 1952 University of Tomas Frias, Bolivia.
- 1953 San Francisco Xavier University, Sucre, Bolivia.
- 1954 Salon of Tarija, Bolivia.
- 1955 Salon of the city of Oruro, Bolivia.
- 1955 Salon of Cochabamba, Bolivia.
- 1955 Salon of the city of La Paz, Bolivia.
- 1957 National Museum of Potosi, Bolivia.

=== Solo exhibitions (international) ===
- 1954 Valparaiso, Chile.
- 1955 Lima, Peru.
- 1955 Rio Janeiro, Brazil.
- 1957 Jocky club, Cordoba, Argentina.
- 1957 Union Artist Gallery, Buenos Aires, Argentina.
- 1958 Buenos Aires, Gallery, Argentina.
- 1960 Punta del Este, Gallery, Uruguay.
- 1960 Peuser gallery, Buenos Aires, Argentina.
- 1961 Pan American Union Gallery, Washington, D.C.
- 1961 Henrri gallery, Alexandria, Virginia.

=== Group exhibitions ===
- 1955 Latin American Exhibition, U.S.A.
- 1962 Columbus Museum of Art and Graphics, Georgia.
- 1962 Latin American Art Festival, U.S. A
- 1963 El Arte actual de America en Europa. Madrid, Spain.

=== Prizes ===
- 1954 First Prize School of Fine Arts Potosi, Bolivia.
- 1955 First Prize, Salon of the City of Potosi, Bolivia.
- 1956 Honorary Mention at the Academy of Fine Arts, Potosi, Bolivia.
- 1956 Acquisition Prize Salon of the City of La Paz, Bolivia.
- 1957, First Prize, JockeyClub, Cordoba, Argentina.
- 1959 First Prize Foreign Artists Salon National of the Fine Arts School of Buenos Aires, Argentina.
- 1962 Prize, Academy of Fine Arts, Barranquilla, Colombia.
- 1964, 3rd Prize, II American Biennale of Cordoba, Argentina.
- 1966, Acquisition Prize, Everson Museum, Syracuse
- 1970, 2nd Prize, Chrysler Festival, Provincetown, Massachusetts.
- 1977, Grand Prize, II Biennale INBO, La Paz.

=== Museum and private collections ===
- Museum of Potosi, Bolivia.
- Museum of Modern Art, Buenos Aires, Argentina.
- Private Collection Ignacio Ibarra, Portugal and Spain
- 1959 National Salon of Fine Arts, Buenos Aires, Argentina.
- 1959 Agrupacion Arte No Figurativo, Buenos Aires, Argentina.
- 1960 Sociedad Ver y Estimar, Buenos Aires, Argentina.
- 1960 First International Art Exhibition, Buenos Aires, Argentina.
- 1961 National Museum of Fine Arts, Buenos Aires, Argentina.
- 1961 Museum of Modern Arts, Rio de Janeiro, Brasil.
- 1961 Special Invitation Sixth Biennalof São Paulo, Brasil in the Pan American Union Representation.
- 1961 First Interamerican Contemporary of Art Hall Gallery, Washington, D.C.
- 1961 Latin American Art, Atlantic City Electric Company.
- 1962 Latin American Art Duke University, Washington, D.C.
- 1962 Latin American Art Foxcroft School, Virginia.

=== Grants ===
- 1961, Pan American Fellowship, Washington, D.C.
- 1963, Guggenheim Fellowship, New York.
- 1964, Pratt GraphicCenter Grant, New York. Prizes:

=== Public collections ===
1. Coin Museum of Potosí, Bolivia.
2. National Museum, La Paz, Bolivia.
3. Museum of Modern Art, Caracas, Venezuela.
4. Museum of Modern Art, Staten Island, New York.
5. Museum of Modern Art of Latin America, Washington, D.C.
6. Permanent Collection, Hartford Foundation, New York.
7. Institute of Spanish Culture, Madrid, Spain.
8. Guggenheim Collection, New York.
9. Permanent Collection, Kaiser, Argentina.
10. Museum of Fine Arts and Modern Art, Toledo, Spain.
11. Museum of Modern Art, New York.
12. Bolivian Embassy, Moscow, Russia.
13. Metropolitan Museum, New York.
14. Center of Interamerican Relations, New York.
15. Everson Museum, Syracuse, New York.
16. Museum of Modern Art, Lima, Peru.
17. Museum of Modern Art, Rio, Brazil.
18. Museum of University of Texas.
19. Interamerican Bank, Washington, D.C.
