= Bogotá Pride =

LGBT+ demonstration in Bogotá, Colombia

Bogotá LGBT+ Pride March and Parade Marcha y Desfile del Orgullo LGBT+ de Bogotá
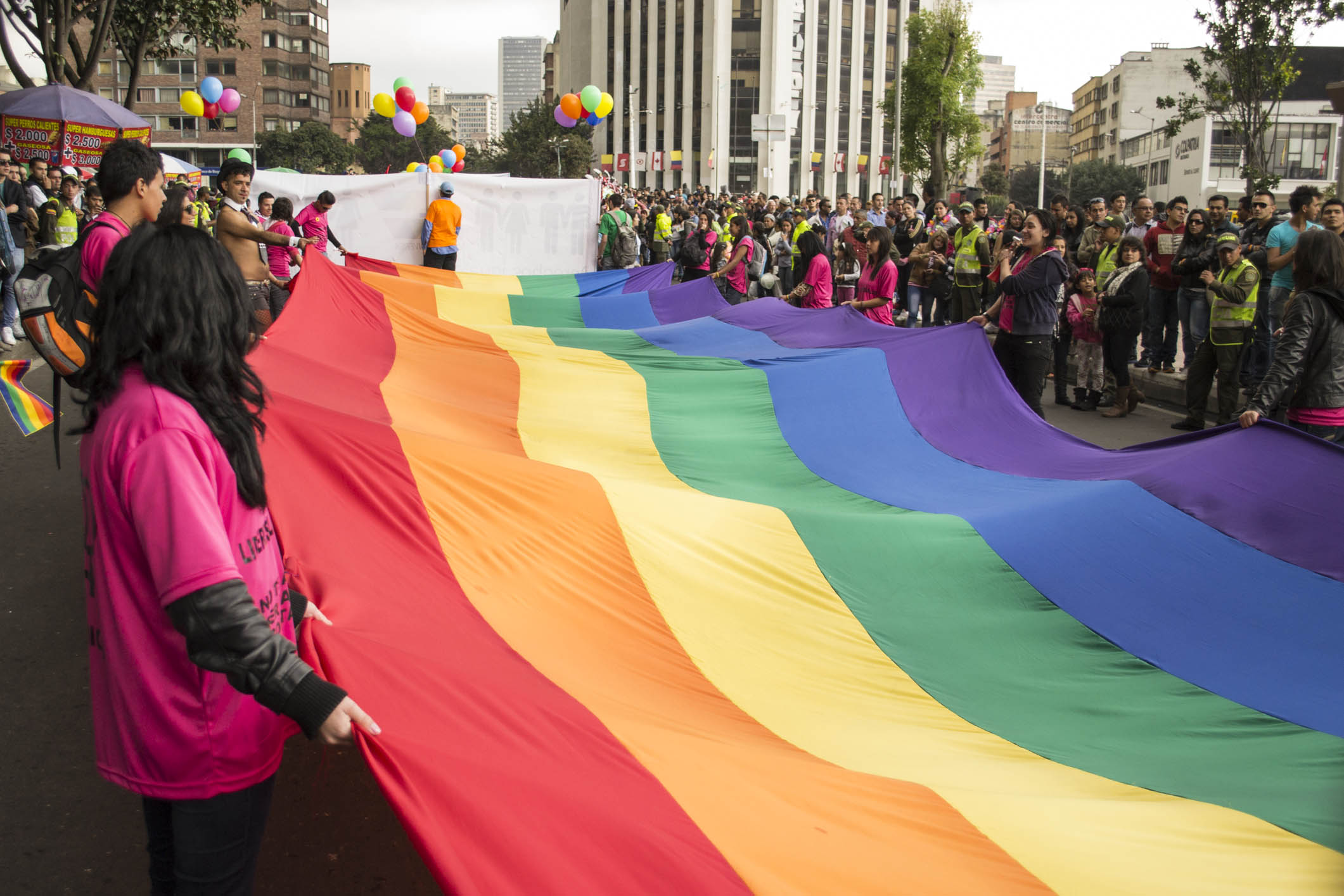
- Carrera Séptima
- Nickname: Bogotá Pride
- Status: Active
- Genre: Pride parade
- Date: 28 June
- Frequency: Annually
- Location: Bogotá
- Country: Colombia
- Years active: 1983–Present
- Inaugurated: 28 June 1983 (43 years ago)
- Attendance: +100,000 people (2023)
- Organiser: Bogotá Pride
- Website: www.bogotapride.com

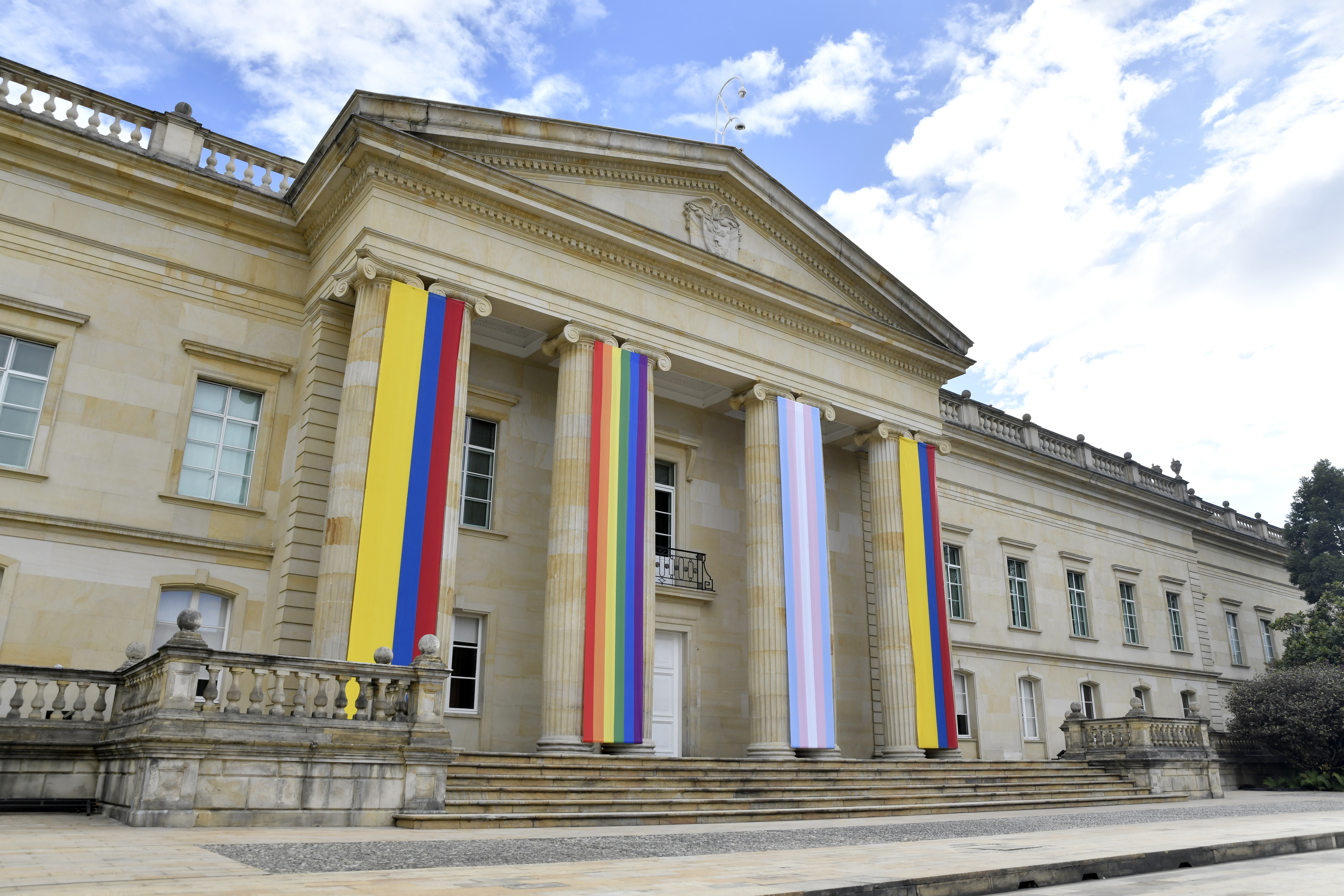
The Casa de Nariño adorned with pride flags in 2023.

The Bogotá LGBT+ Pride March and Parade (Spanish: Marcha y Desfile del Orgullo LGBT+ de Bogotá), commonly known as Bogotá Pride, is an annual pride parade and demonstration held in Bogotá, Colombia, to commemorate International LGBT Pride Day.

== History ==
On 28 June 1977, the Colombian Homosexual Liberation Movement (Movimiento de Liberación Homosexual de Colombia, MLHC) was founded by Manuel Velandia, León Zuleta, and Guillermo Cortés. This organization was the first political project advocating for the LGBTQ community in the country, composed of branches in cities across Colombia.

It is debated whether the first modern pride march in Colombia was held in 1982 or 1983, but the general series of events and location, the capital city of Bogotá, is agreed upon. An analysis of contemporary sources and accounts by historian Felipe Caro Romero published in 2022 came to the conclusion that the event occurred on 28 June 1983.

On that day, a group of approximately 32 LGBTQ people organized by the MLHC gathered to protest in Bogotá. They held flowers and banners, with some partially covering their faces to avoid identification. The crowd marched through the main streets in the center of the city, from the Plaza de Toros to the Plazoleta de las Nieves. The used the slogan "Enough of walking in the shadows" (Basta ya de andar por la sombra).

Another march in Bogotá was held on June 28, 1996, organized by the Equiláteros Group and activists Manuel Velandia and León Zuleta with a small number of participants. The following year, the march gained more strength due to the realization of the Cultural and Sports Week, created by the G&L Organization, and took place between June 21 and 30; that week included a march along the Bogotá bike path in which a 16 by 3 metres (52.5 ft × 9.8 ft) rainbow flag was displayed.

Between 2003 and 2008 it was called the "March of Full LGBT Citizenship" ( Marcha de la Ciudadanía Plena LGBT) and in 2009 and 2010 it was called the "Marches of Diverse Citizenships" (Marchas de las Ciudadanías Diversas).

In 2019, the Bogotá pride march, which moved through Carrera 7 from the National Park to Plaza de Bolívar, brought together approximately 90,000 people.

As a result of the COVID-19 pandemic, Bogotá's LGBTQ pride march was suspended in 2020 and replaced by a virtual event held on June 28. The following year, the in-person events were resumed and held on July 4.

== See also ==
- LGBTQ people in Colombia
- LGBTQ rights in Colombia
