= To Hell with the Goddamn Spring =

To Hell with the Goddamn Spring (

Spanish: Al diablo la maldita primavera) is a Colombian play, based on the novel of the same name by Alonso Sánchez Baute (which won the Opera prima award in 2002). It was adapted for the theatre by Colombian director Jorge Ali Triana in 2004.

The play is a monologue given by an average bureaucrat called Edwin Rodríguez Vuelvas, who gradually transforms himself into a drag queen while expressing inner angst and sorrow. The character is reminiscent of Molly Bloom in James Joyce´s Ulysses; the story also contains elements taken from Proust, kitsch glamour and a sense of ridiculous that recalls the antics of Groucho Marx. The play offers a criticism of intolerance, both from society in general and from within the LGBT community.

== Main character ==
Edwin Rodriguez represents the gay men who migrate from the small cities and provinces of the country to the capital in search of an environment in which they may express themselves more freely. Colombian actor Orlando Valenzuela was chosen for the role based on his experience in the contemporary theatre in Spain and traditional Japanese kabuki theatre.

== Plot ==
The character begins by narrating the present state of his life: his unrewarding, superfluous bureaucratic job, the relative wealth he enjoys, and his successes in the drag queen beauty contests. It moves on to his memories of his troubled childhood in the Caribbean Region of Colombia. By the time he has transformed, he enjoys moments of temporary happiness as he wins a contest. This concludes with sadness, as he recalls the solitude and emptiness of his life. The final section of the monologue, from which the title of the play is taken, expresses the nihilism that has come to invade the character's attitudes.

Fue mas o menos asi: Vino blanco, noche y viejas canciones; y se reia de mi, dulce embustera, la maldita primavera. ¿Qué queda de un sueño erotico si de repente me despierto y te has ido? Siento el vacio de ti. Dejame amarte, como si el amor doliera. Aunque no quiera, sin quererlo pienso en ti. Que si para enamorame ahora, volvera a mi la maldita primavera que sueño si para enamorarme basta una hora. Pasa ligera la maldita primavera, pasa ligera y me hace daño solo a mi. Al diablo la maldita primavera.

It went more or less like this: white wine, nighttime, and old songs… and laughing at me, the sweet liar, the damned spring. What remains of an erotic dream if, when I awake, you are gone? I feel the void of your absence. I can only love you as if love hurts. Even though I don’t want to, I still think of you. If I fall in love now, the damned spring will come back to me. Is what I dream about just for an hour enough to fall in love? The damned spring goes by quickly. It goes by fast, hurting only me. To hell with the damned spring.

The words quoted are nothing more than the lyrics of "Maldita primavera", a popular song first sung in Spanish by Yuri in 1982 and then by others.

== See also ==
- LGBT in Colombia
