= Dick's Kiss =

1992 novel by Fernando Molano Vargas

- Author: Fernando Molano Vargas
- Language: Spanish
- Genre: Coming of age, LGBT Literature
- Publication date: 1992
- Publication place: Colombia

Dick's Kiss (Spanish: Un beso de Dick) is the first novel by Colombian writer Fernando Molano Vargas, first published in 1992. The plot follows the story of Felipe and Leonardo, two Colombian teenagers and high school classmates who fall in love and begin a romantic relationship, which is soon put to the test by the people around them. The work explores themes of love, desire, and death in the context of male homosexuality.

It is considered a pioneer work within Colombian LGBT literature due to the way it handles romantic relationships between characters of the same sex in which the tenderness and happiness of the characters prevail instead of tragedy, in contrast with the "bury your gays" trope. It is also considered a cult work and is Molano's most famous book.

The novel was translated to English by John C. Miller and published in 2005 by the University Press of the South.

== Plot ==
Felipe is a sixteen-year-old boy who goes to high school in Bogotá in the early 1990s. During lunch breaks and in his free time, he loves to play soccer with his friends, among whom is Leonardo, with whom Felipe is secretly in love and for whom he feels a strong erotic attraction. After attending parties together and even having a fight, Felipe discovers that Leonardo is also in love with him, which leads them to start a romantic relationship.

The two become inseparable, but one day, a school custodian finds them kissing. When Felipe's father finds out, he explodes in a fit of rage and beats him. After recovering, Felipe discovers that his aunt had arrived for a visit, making him fear his father plans to send him to Medellín to live with her. However, Felipe soon discovers that his aunt actually supports his relationship with Leonardo, and she decides to take him to reunite with his boyfriend. In the last chapter, Felipe and Leonardo spend the afternoon together, more certain than ever of their love.

== Main characters ==
- Felipe Valencia Arango: He is the protagonist and narrator of the novel, a 16-year-old Colombian teenager who is in the 9th grade and loves to play soccer with his classmates. He is described in the novel as a naïve but curious boy, so he constantly questions himself about issues such as love, individual freedom, and society's reaction to homosexuality. He wants to direct a film, the plot of which he describes as a romantic story that ends in tragedy.
- Leonardo: He is the friend Felipe is attracted to, and later, his boyfriend. Like him, he loves to play soccer, but he also loves literature, particularly classic authors such as Miguel de Cervantes and Charles Dickens. In the novel, he is described in several passages as having a nostalgic and sometimes even sad personality. Due to his extensive knowledge, he serves as a guide in many aspects for Felipe, who is strongly attracted to Leonardo's displays of affection that make him feel like he belongs with him.
- Hugo: He was a friend of Felipe's who died four years before the beginning of the plot, but who is remembered repeatedly by the main character due to the love he felt for him. He appears from the first sentence of the novel, as a remembrance of the protagonist. The character is inspired by the real life figure of Hugo Molina (also known as Diego), Molano's partner who died years before he wrote the novel.

== Writing and analysis ==
The writing process for the novel took Molano about seven months and took place from late 1989 to early 1990. The plot is narrated in first person from Felipe's point of view, through internal monologues and stream of consciousness. In addition to themes such as love, homoerotic desire, and death, the novel explores themes such as machismo and the lack of freedom of adolescents in patriarchal societies, a fact that is represented in Felipe's father and the violence he exerts on him in the second part of the novel.

Unlike other LGBT novels from the 20th century, in Dick's Kiss, Molano shows a homosexual couple that breaks the stereotypes of the time by being athletic, sports lovers and opposed to extremely sentimental actions, which they dismiss as “mariconerías”. The sexual attraction between the protagonists is increased by the practice of activities seen at the time as “masculine”. The author Adrián Melo points out how the novel's emphasis on portraying the story from a perspective of tenderness, eroticism, and happy moments instead of tragedy marks another difference.

Molano's prose is simple and directly describes the sexual encounters between the protagonists. According to scholar Daniel Giraldo, these descriptions take the form of poetic interludes in the work, so the novel could also be understood as a set of poems interwoven by narrative sections. An example of the style of the work can be seen in the following fragment, in which Felipe describes Leonardo:

But he looks so beautiful like that... I think that's why I fell in love with him: because he has a face that looks like he's always longing...: with those eyes, so big and full of eyelashes [...] And you see him, and you're afraid that if you touch him, he's going to cry; but then you look at him like that, and he cracks a smile: because he's almost always happy. And that's so nice! [...] And that's what happens to me with Leonardo: I just look at him and he gives me the type of joy that makes me wish I knew where I feel happiness so I could touch it [...]

The novel is dedicated to Diego Molina, Molano's partner, who had died some time before due to health complications caused by AIDS. In addition to the dedication, the novel refers to Diego from its first pages through the evocation of the character Hugo (which was Diego's real name), the protagonist's friend whom he loved and who died before the beginning of the plot. After Diego's death, Molano was the one who wrote the epitaph on his tomb, where he included verses from the poem “Partir”, by the Colombian writer Héctor Ignacio Rodríguez.

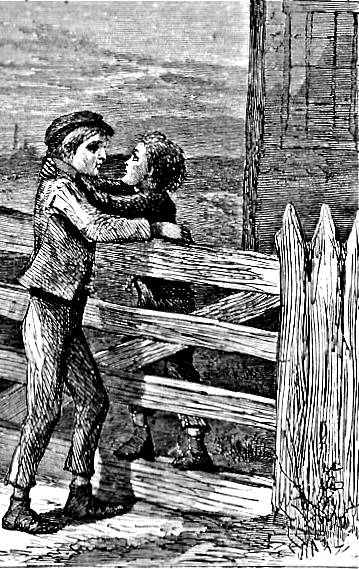
Illustration from the 1867 edition of Oliver Twist portraying the farewell between Oliver and Dick, the scene that inspired the title of the novel.

The importance of Diego in the novel was also emphasized by writer Héctor Abad Faciolince, who, in the prologue to the third edition of the novel, stated that the writing of Dick's Kiss was probably a way for Molano to prolong his partner's life. According to Abad, the figure of Diego would continue to be of vital importance in Molano's later works: the poetry collection Todas mis cosas en tus bolsillos (1997) and the posthumous novel Vista desde una acera (2012) formed a sort of trilogy alongside his first novel, in which the figure of Diego was always present.

The title of Dick's Kiss is inspired by a scene from the novel Oliver Twist (1837) by British author Charles Dickens. In this work, the character of Dick gives Oliver a kiss as he says goodbye to him, sad to see his friend leave for London and knowing that he would later die. In his novel, Molano indicates, in relation to this scene:

I guess no one will remember that scene. At least, not in the way I remember it. Because, of course, only I have my heart. And I suppose that, if someone were to read it, they would only see two children saying goodbye to each other [...] I saw something else: two children kissing each other, two children who loved each other.

== Publication ==
The novel won the Medellín Chamber of Commerce award in 1992. According to an article published by the newspaper El Tiempo on July 26 of the same year, Molano stated that, given his limited economic resources, he would use the prize money to buy shoes and a tape recorder, as well as to go to the movies several times, to buy books and to invite his friends over for a few beers.

Due to the subject matter of the book, the Medellín Chamber of Commerce publisher chose as the cover for the first edition a close-up of the face of the angel that appears in the painting Virgin of the Rocks, by Leonardo da Vinci, which, although mentioned in the novel, was chosen by the publisher so as not to give information on the cover about the content of the book. The publisher still received several letters of protest from people complaining about the “vulgarities” included in the book. Although this edition did not have a large circulation, the novel began to be distributed directly, by means of photocopies among its fans, and acquired cult status over the years.

In a television interview after its publication, Molano stated, in reference to how he would like the novel to be remembered:

I imagine this novel being read [...] and I hope that it will be read three centuries from now, when love between two people of the same sex would not be objectionable. I suppose that certain values would be discovered that I hope to have left in the novel independent of gay matters.

== Reception and legacy ==
The Colombian writer and journalist Héctor Abad Faciolince, who was part of the jury that awarded the 1992 Medellín Chamber of Commerce prize to Dick's Kiss, stated in 2005, in relation to his initial opinion after reading the novel:

It was a little gem thanks also to its imperfections, because they revealed the spontaneity, the freshness, the lack of artifice and the literary frankness of the person who had written it. This is not to say that the writer who was revealed in this book was a beginner, a self-taught person without any reading, a wild writer. No. Alongside the naivety and spontaneity in the background, there was also someone with culture, a sensitive reader who knew how to distinguish the gold from the dross, and someone for whom literature and life were happily related.

Writer Andrea Mejía, in a review published in the newspaper El Tiempo in 2019, praised the novel's emotion and the simplicity of the language used by Molano, and also called it a “celebration of friendship, of the inescapable in life, the most painful and the most beautiful”. The review in Semana magazine, written by Luis Noriega, referred positively to the novel and highlighted Molano's way of approaching the idyll between the two young people. Noriega also stated that, in the years following its publication, the work had lost “none of its originality and (...) none of its strength and tenderness”.

Andrés Gómez Quevedo, of the OnCubaNews website, also reacted positively to the novel and stated that he wept at the tenderness of the ending and that he would include it in the list of books that have touched him. Among the aspects he praised was the development of the characters' relationship.

The novel was adapted for the theater by a stage group from the University of Antioquia. The theatrical version was staged for more than ten seasons. In Bogotá, it was presented at the Teatro Barraca.

== See also ==
- LGBT literature in Colombia
