= Laura Weinstein =

Colombian human rights activist (1962–2021)

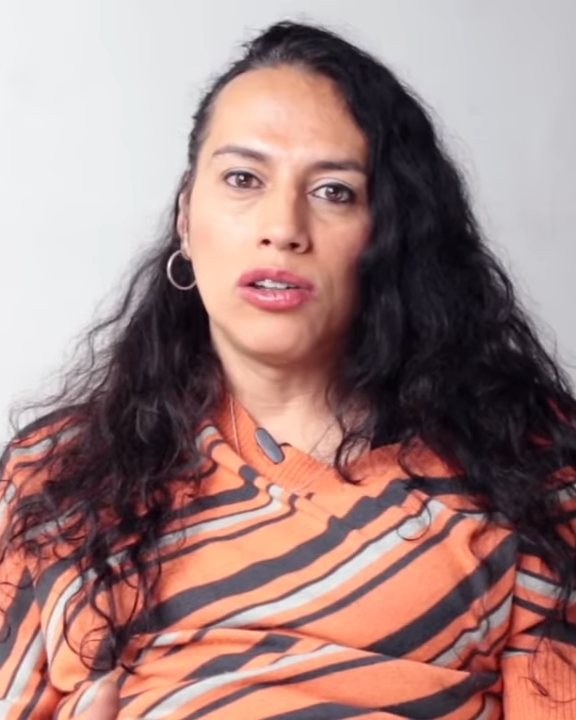
- Weinstein in 2017
- Born: 1962; Bogotá, Colombia
- Died: 2 January 2021 (aged 58–59); Bogotá, Colombia
- Education: Monserrate University Foundation
- Occupation: LGBTQ activist

Laura Frida Weinstein (1962 – 2 January 2021) was a Colombian human rights activist. From 2010 until her death she was the coordinator of Fundación Grupo de Acción y Apoyo a Personas Trans (lit. 'Trans People Action and Support Group Foundation'), a transgender support group.

== Biography ==
Weinstein was born in 1962 in Bogotá, Colombia, the youngest of seven children in a Jewish family; her family had emigrated to the country during the 1940s after fleeing antisemitism in Nazi Germany. Weinstein began identifying as female at the age of five, though she did publicly identify as so. During her childhood she experienced significant bullying and was regularly made to see psychologists. At the age of 17, she moved to Israel, where she studied Jewish history. Weinstein later returned to Colombia, where she studied social work at the Monserrate University Foundation.

At the age of 20, Weinstein began hormone replacement therapy and started living openly as a woman; at the age of 37, she underwent gender transition. After coming out as a trans woman, she experienced some hardships, including the loss of familial relationships and discrimination within society. Weinstein was invited to speak at Limud, a Jewish dialogue conference in Argentina, where she spoke about the LGBTQ experience within the Jewish community; at the conference, she adopted a new Jewish name, Sara, to reflect her trans identity. She became exposed to LGBTQ activists in Colombia after joining Travestis Bogotá, a Yahoo group consisting of people with non-cisgender gender identities. She later founded Transrevolucionando Géneros, a trans rights group, and Aquelarre Trans, a coalition of trans groups.

In 2009, Weinstein joined the Chapinero-based Fundación Grupo de Acción y Apoyo a Personas Trans, which had been founded in 2007 to help people transitioning, as well as their families; she led their weekly group sessions until her death. In 2010, she became the group's coordinator and executive director as it expanded its scope to include addressing cases of human rights violations and discrimination against transgender people, including logging cases of transfemicide; Weinstein also shifted the group's focus to include supporting, rather than shunning or ignoring, trans sex workers. Weinstein worked with the Ministry of the Interior and the Ministry of Justice providing advisory support on legislation that would subsequently be passed in 2015 as decree 1227, which allowed transgender people to have their gender identity reflected on their identity cards. Following this, Weinstein was able to legally change her gender to female.

Weinstein died on 2 January 2021 of complications from COVID-19, after being hospitalised on 31 December.

== Recognition ==
In June 2023, the Laura Weinstein LGBTI Centre North Zone (Spanish: Casa LGBTI Laura Weinstein Zona Norte) was opened in Suba by the Mayor of Bogotá, Claudia López. It was the fifth LGBTQ centre established in the city.
