= Manuel Velandia =

Colombian activist (born 1955)

- Born: Manuel Antonio Velandia Mora; June 1, 1955 (age 71); Socorro, Santander, Colombia
- Education: Cooperative University of Colombia
- Occupations: Activist; Cultural Manager; Philosopher; Professor; Sexologist

Manuel Antonio Velandia Mora (born June 1, 1955) is a Colombian professor, sexologist, philosopher, cultural manager, and LGBTQ+ activist. He is recognized for being a co-founder of the Movimiento de Liberación Homosexual along with León Zuleta, as well as a co-organizer of the first LGBT Pride march held in Colombia, in the city of Bogotá.

== Biography ==
Manuel Antonio Velandia Mora was born on June 1, 1955 in Socorro, Santander. He studied sociology and philosophy at Cooperative University of Colombia and earned his master's degree in education from Pontificia Universidad Javeriana. His career began as a professor at several universities.

Velandia began his activism career in 1979, he founded the Movimiento de Liberación Homosexual of Colombia, by León Zuleta and Guillermo Cortés. At the end of the 1970s, the MLHC mobilized to push for the decriminalization of homosexuality in the new Colombian Criminal Code of 1980, which was achieved through Decree 100 of 1980, which decriminalized homosexuality in Colombia. This same movement would succeed on June 28, 1983 in the city of Bogotá, the first LGBT Pride march in Colombia, in which a few dozen people participated.

In 2002, during the presidency of Álvaro Uribe Vélez, Velandia was the subject of an assassination attempt when his candidacy for the House of Representatives was launched by the Colombian Liberal Party, a grenade was thrown at him in his residence.

In 2007, Velandia went into exile in Alicante, Spain, where political asylum was granted due to threats from the United Self-Defense Forces of Colombia for the fight for homosexual, transsexual and non-binary rights, which was a cultural persecution. He advanced a specialization in nursing and care culture at the University of Alicante. He was recognized as the first homosexual victim of the Colombian armed conflict in the Truth Commission.
