= Felix Angel =

Colombian artist & writer

Félix Ángel
- Born: Colombia
- Education: Institute of Fine Arts of Medellin; National University (School of Architecture)
- Known for: Painting; drawing; writing
- Style: Figurative, expressionistic
- Parents: Arturo Angel Vallejo (father); Soledad Gomez Sepúlveda (mother)
- Awards: Special Award in Drawing (Museo de Zea, 1972); First Prize in Painting (Museo de Zea, 1973)

Félix Ángel (Medellín) is a Colombian-born artist and writer based in Washington DC since 1977.

He has been producing work for nearly 40 years. He has also served as Commissioner on the Arts and Humanities for Washington, D.C. for five years, and is a contributing editor of the Handbook of Latin American Studies in the Library of Congress, since the year 2000. Felix Angel has received several national and international awards for his work, and his art is in several museums in Latin America, the United States, and England; not to mention many private collections as well. He is the director of the Cultural Center of the Inter-American Development Bank, in Washington.

== Early years ==
Felix was born the fourth child in a family of ten. His father, Arturo Angel Vallejo, was manager of the Pan American Life Insurance Company in Medellin, Colombia. His mother, Soledad Gomez Sepúlveda, and her family came from a region in Colombia called the Old Caldas. Both of his parents had lost their father at a relatively early age which was one of the reasons why they both were hardworking people; which Felix appreciated. The Angel-Gómez family lived in a big house in the city's downtown, which was a very nice neighborhood, and usually spent vacation with the entire family at a beautiful country house their owned outside of Medellin.

== Schooling ==
When Felix was six, his parents enrolled him at a military school called Colegio San Jose. There, he graduated high school at the age of 17, in 1966. He was accepted at the School of Architecture of the National University. Out of more than 2,000 applicants, only 72 were accepted. Eventually, Felix graduated as an Architect in 1974.

== Drawn to Art ==
"I had a natural proclivity to like the arts, although I did not know why. I guess it was my creative nature, and it was one thing I missed everywhere growing up because Medellin in those days was a very business-like, kind of pragmatic society."

At the age of 11, Felix Angel developed the custom of going to the local public library where he discovered on his own the wonderful world of art: reading art history books, manuals about how to draw, etc. His first solo exhibition took place at Colegio San José, when he was only 14 years of age, exhibiting again at age 16 in the Music Room of the same school. The local newspaper El Colombiano even chronicled his second exhibition in a column known then as Notas Culturales (Cultural Notes).

When Felix was 16, his father allowed him to take art courses at the Institute of Fine Arts of Medellin, which he paid for (during this time, Felix was still in High School). He received his first art award at age 21, at a local competition in Medellin held in 1971 at the Museo de Zea (known today as Museo de Antioquia) while he was studying architecture. His first professional solo exhibition took place at Medellin's GranColombiano Bank in February 1972 and that year he won Special Award in Drawing at the Museo de Zea Salon de Artistas Jovenes (Salon of Young Artists) and won again in 1973 First Prize in Painting.

The year that he graduated as an architect (1974), Felix was nominated by Alejandro Obregón to receive the Colombian National Award at the National Salon. He had come a long way.

In the beginning, and for a long time, I think I could be considered as a "figurative", expressionistic artist, and now I can say I have multiple ways to convey visually my ideas and creative motivation. However, some concerns have always intrigued me, and those are related to man's behavior, socio-culturally speaking...I think people can see that as a constant in my work throughout the many—and sometimes different stages...

== First Trip to the U.S. ==
Felix Angel came to the United States for the first time in 1974, which was three weeks after graduating as an architect. He was invited by the Organization of American States Visual Arts Program Director, the well-known art critic José Gómez-Sicre, to exhibit his art in Washington, D.C. He returned to the U.S. several times after that, and ultimately decided to settle in Washington DC in 1977, where he has lived since.

He has published three books about art, one novel, many articles, and almost one hundred catalogues of exhibitions, he has curated or organized.

== Bibliography ==
Books by Félix Ángel:

- "Te Quiero Mucho Poquito Nada" (I Love You, I Love You Not), novel, Spanish, Félix Ángel, Medellin, 1974.
- "Nosotros: Un trabajo sobre los artistas antioqueños", Félix Ángel/Museo El Castillo, Spanish, Medellín, 1976.
- "Nosotros, Vosotros, Ellos: Memoria del arte en Medellín en los años 70" (We, They, Them: A Memoir About the Arts in Medellín During the 1970s), Spanish, Félix Ángel/Tragaluz Editores, Medellín, 2008.
- "The Latin American Spirit: Art and Artists in the United States" (Co-written), English, also available in Spanish, Bronx Museum of the Arts/Harry Abrams, New York, U.S.A., 1989.
