= León Zuleta =

Colombian LGBT activist (1952–1993)

- Born: 18 November 1952; Itagüí, Antioquia Department, Colombia
- Died: 23 August 1993 (aged 40); Medellín, Antioquia Department
- Cause of death: Murder
- Education: University of Antioquia
- Occupations: Professor and writer
- Employer(s): University of Antioquia; University of Nariño; Pedagogical and Technological University of Colombia

Benhur León Adalberto Zuleta Ruíz (18 November 1952 – 23 August 1993) commonly known as León Zuleta, was a Colombian professor, writer, philosopher, journalist and LGBT activist. He was the cofounder of the Movimiento de Liberación Homosexual (English: Homosexual Liberation Movement) with activist Manuel Velandia; with Velandia he was also the co-organizer of the first Colombian pride parade, which was held in Bogotá.

== Biography ==
Zuleta was born on 18 November 1952 in Itagüí, to a working working class but intellectual family. He was the fourth of 13 children had by Próspero Zuleta, a professional carpenter, atheist, and socialist; and Esperanza Ruiz, a housewife who shared his ideas.

=== Youth ===
For his baccalaureate degree he attended the lyceum of the University of Antioquia between 1966 and 1971. During this time, he joined the Colombian Communist Youth (JUCO). In 1974, he began studying philosophy and literature at the University of Antioquia and graduated in 1979 but was expelled from JUCO for being homosexual. The 23rd congress of the Colombian Communist Party recognized this as an error and within the party's renewed gender approach. Zuleta interacted with feminists at the University of Antioquia, such as María Lady Londoño, with whom he held marches and talks regarding issues including advocacy for the decriminalization of abortion.

=== Professor ===
In 1973, he started his professional career as an ad honorem professor at the lyceum of the Universidad Autónoma Latinoamericana. In 1980, he moved to Pasto to work as a professor at the faculty of philosophy and humanities of the University of Nariño. In 1984, he was forced to resign due to his ideological difference, past union membership, and issue with his sexuality. That same year, he began studying for his master's degree in psychopedagogy at the University of Antioquia; during this time he began working for Amnesty International. In 1991, he moved to Chiquinquirá to become a professor at the Pedagogical and Technological University of Colombia.

== Activism ==
Zuleta believed the gay liberation movement should begin at psychological liberation. In 1977, he founded the magazine El Otro, which served to vindicate homosexuals and be a means of communication for them; it circulated from 1977 to 1979. In 1979, he founded a homonymous newspaper, which exposed ideas of the homosexual liberation movement. A communist newspaper claimed the number of supporters was 10,000, which was a lie; it was used to motivate people to join Zuleta in creating a true homosexual liberation movement. The only person to respond was Manuel Velandia.

On 28 June 1977, the Movimiento de Liberación Homosexual de Colombia (English: Homosexual Liberation Movement of Colombia) was founded by Manuel Velandia, Guillermo Cortés, and Zuleta. At the decade's end, the MLHC pushed for the decriminalization of homosexuality in the 1980 penal code, which was achieved with decree 100. On 28 June 1983, in Bogotá, they held the first LGBTQ Pride March in Bogotá in Colombia, which is said to have had 32 participants, who painted their faces to avoid recognition.

== Murder ==
On 23 August 1993, Zuleta was found stabbed in his apartment in eastern Medellín. His murder was never investigated, but is believed to be a hate crime.

== León Zuleta awards ==
As of 2022, for 14 years La Mesa LGBT Bogotá has awarded people and institutions for defending and integrating the LGBT community and is in its fourteenth edition.

In Medellín, the LGBTI Social Alliance of Antioquia and mayor's office of Medellín also gifts a homonymous award. In 2022, it was in its seventh edition.

== Work ==
Throughout his life León Zuleta produced an extensive number of articles, poems, novels, and essays:

=== Poems ===
- Poemarios, laberinto de futuro a presente (1969)
- Libro de la errancia (1974)
- Libro de los raptos (1975)
- Jaulas doradas las ciudades (1977)
- Terra incógnita (1979)
- Libro de los astros errantes (1981)
- Lectura inversa de una taza de té (1983)
- Primer libro de los sueños (1985)
- Provecta poémica (1985)
- Laberinto las urbes (1987)
- Laberinto solar (1989)
- Orbis pictus – Oníricas (1989)
- Soles en rotación – Sueños (1990)

=== Novels ===
- Bazuko Street (1984)
- El suicida en la salita de estar (1984)
- Atomitrón (1987)

=== Books ===
- De semas y plebes (1996) (Posthumanous)
