= Raúl Gómez Jattin =

Colombian poet (1945–1997)

- Born: Raúl del Cristi Gómez Jattin; 31 May 1945; Cartagena, Colombia, Colombia
- Died: 22 May 1997 (aged 51); Cartagena, Colombia, Colombia
- Occupation: Poet

Raúl del Cristi Gómez Jattin (31 May 1945 – 22 May 1997) was an influential Colombian poet.

== Life ==
Gómez Jattin was born in Cartagena, Colombia, to journalist Joaquín Pablo Gómez Reynero and Lola Jattin. His mother was of Syrian ancestry. He spent most of his childhood in the town of Cereté, and then sent to his maternal grandmother in Cartagena, where he finished his secondary education. His father possessed a large library, and Gómez Jattin, confined at home by his asthma, became an avid reader from a very young age. After spending a few years as a secondary education teacher in Cereté, he moved to Bogota, in 1964, to obtain a degree in law from Universidad Externado, under pressure by his father. It was in this university where he first came into contact with theatre, becoming part of the university's experimental theatre group, and where he started to write poetry first.

He went back to Cereté without finishing his studies, at a time where the death of his father triggered the first of many psychotic episodes that would afflict him for the rest of his life. He was diagnosed with manic-depression and schizophrenia. At this time he also started consuming illicit drugs. He spent his time between psychiatric institutions and living in the streets. He moved later to Cartagena, where the cycle of psychiatric admissions and homelessness continued, in addition to some time spent in jail.

In the middle of what was assumed to be a psychotic episode, Gómez Jattin jumped to death in front of a running bus on May 22, 1997. It has never been clear whether his death was accidental or a suicide.

He was a distant relative and close friend of journalist and writer Juan Gossaín when they both studied in the same school in Cartagena.

== Poetry ==
His reading of poets Machado, García Lorca, Rubén Darío, Fernando Pessoa, Cavafy, and many others inspired him to become a poet himself. He first started to write poetry while doing theatre in Bogota. Following his return to Cereté, Gómez Jattin had been devoted at first to theatre, as an actor, and then as director and playwright. By this time, he had also come into contact with illicit drugs and started showing the first signs of mental illness, having been interned in a psychiatric hospital for the first time in 1978. With the economic support from his friend Juan Manuel Ponce, he managed to publish his first poetry book Poemas (1980). Journalist and writer Milcíades Arévalo received the book, and decided to publish a couple of his poems in Puesto de Combate, the literary magazine he had founded in 1972. Arévalo was responsible of making his work well known around the whole country, just at the time where his continuous cycle of mental health crises and periods of homelessness.

His poetry has been described as stark and realist, and highly autobiographic, dealing with his struggles with mental illness, his solitude, his childhood memories, his sexuality, his friends and relatives, and his city. His most well-known book, Tríptico Cereteano, was published in 1988, and it gave him renown, which allowed him for the next years to appear in literary festivals, radio shows, and magazines, and to teach writing workshops. His later work was badly received by the critics, as being hurried and of lesser quality and creativity.

== Works ==
- Poemas (1980)
- Tríptico Cereteano (1988)
- Hijos del Tiempo (1989)
- El Esplendor de la Mariposa (1993)
- Poesía 1980-1989, (Anthology, 1995)
- Amanecer en el valle del Sinú (Anthology, 2004)
