= List of protests in the 21st century =

List of protest movements from 2000–present

This is a list of protests in the 21st century.

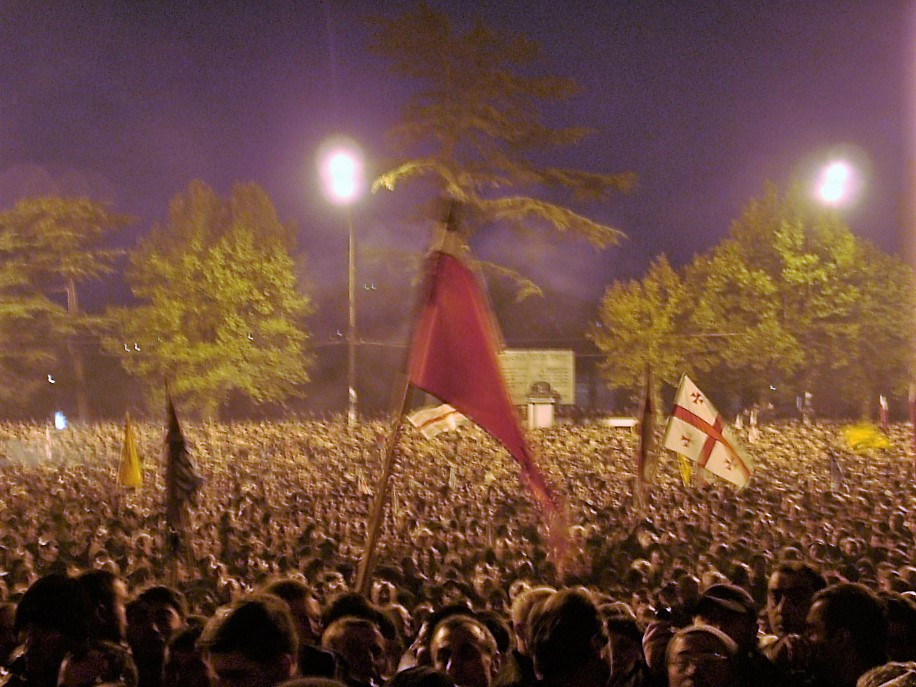
Georgian colour revolution, named Rose revolution.

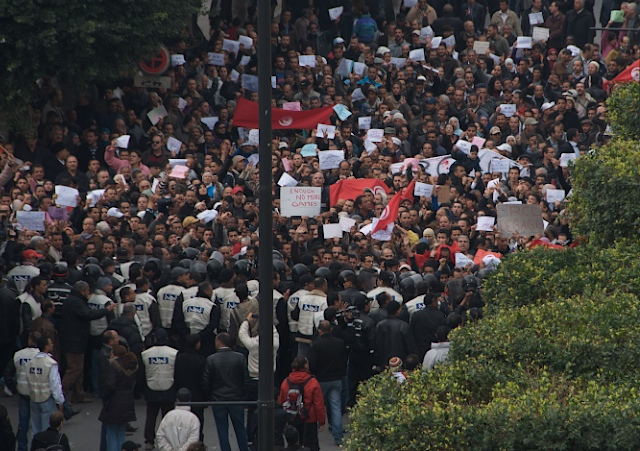
Mass demonstrations in Avenue Habib Bourguiba during the Tunisian revolution that overthrew the regime of Zine El Abidine Ben Ali on 14 January 2011.

== Revolutions and uprisings ==
=== Plants (Colour) revolutions ===
- Rose Revolution (Georgia, 2003)
- Tulip Revolution (Kyrgyzstan, 2005)
- Cedar Revolution (Lebanon, 2005)
- Orange Revolution (Ukraine, 2004–2005)
- Saffron Revolution (Myanmar, 2007)

=== Arab Spring ===
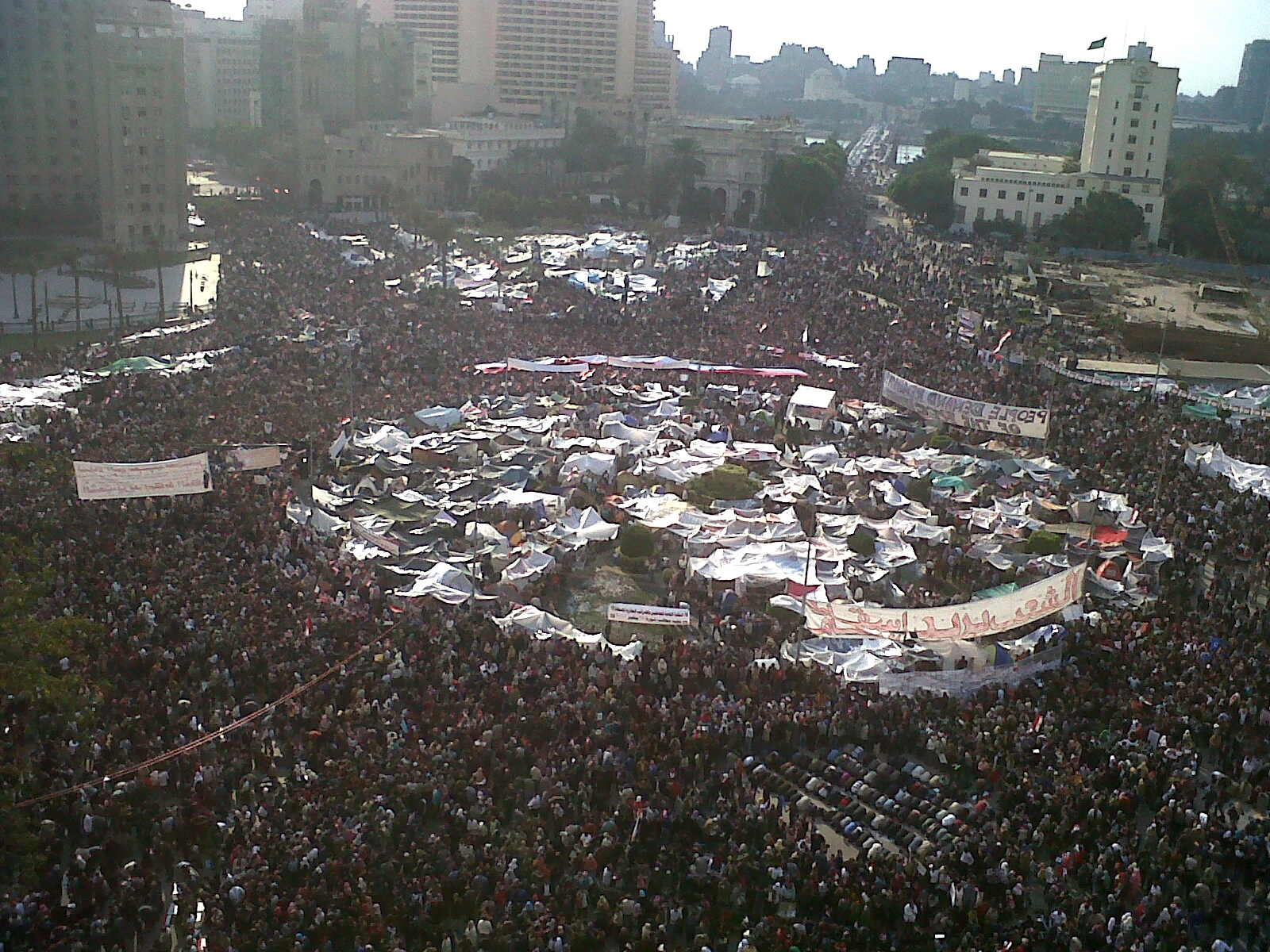
Demonstrators in Cairo's Tahrir Square on 8 February 2011

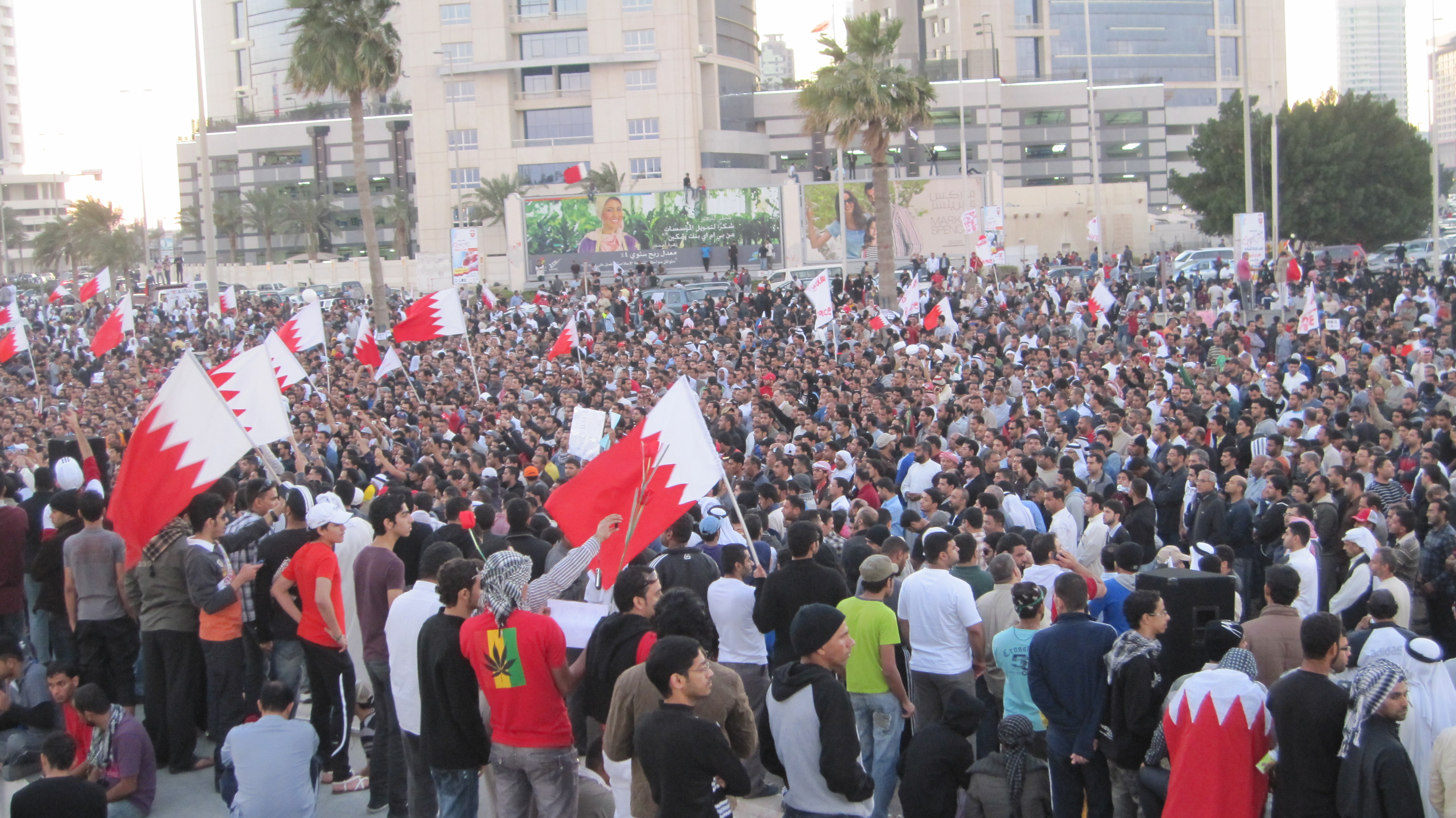
2011 Bahraini protests

- 2010–2012 Algerian protests
- 2011 Bahraini uprising
- 2011 Turkish Cypriot protests
- 2011 Djiboutian protests
- 2011 Egyptian revolution
- 2011–2012 Jordanian protests
- 2011 Iraqi protests
- 2011 Lebanese protests
- First Libyan Civil War
- 2011–2012 Mauritanian protests
- 2011–2012 Moroccan protests
- 2011 Western Saharan protests
- 2011 Omani protests
- 2011–2012 Palestinian protests
- 2011–2012 Saudi Arabian protests
- 2011–2013 Sudanese protests
- Syrian revolution
- Tunisian revolution
- Yemeni revolution

=== Other Arab uprisings ===
- 2012–2013 Egyptian protests
- Post-coup unrest in Egypt (2013–2014)
- 2012–2013 Iraqi protests
- 2015–2018 Iraqi protests
- 2013–2014 Tunisian political crisis

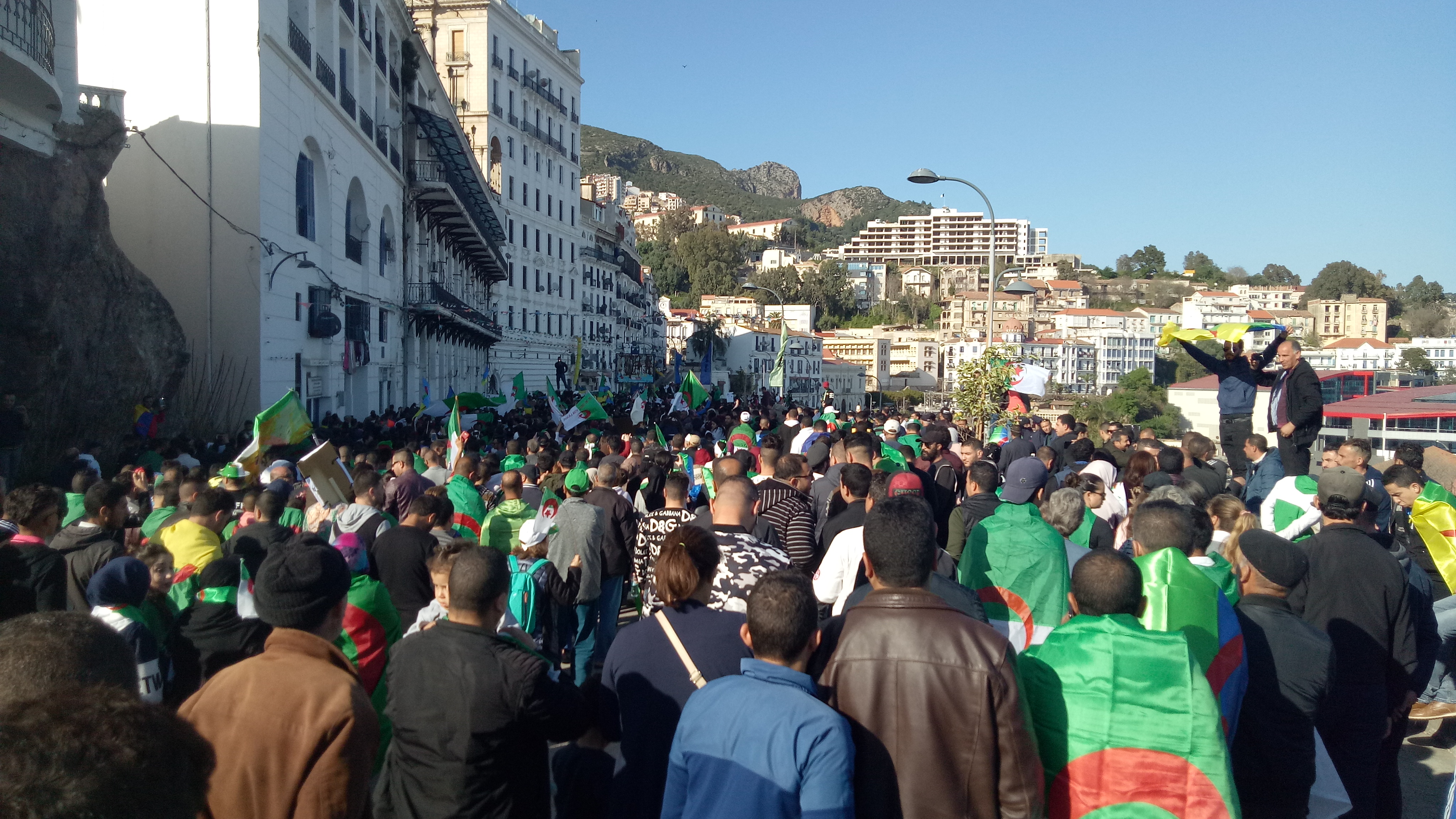
2019–2021 Algerian protests

- 2018 Tunisian protests
- 2018 Jordanian protests
- 2018 Iraqi protests
- Sudanese Revolution (2018–19)
- 2019 Gaza economic protests
- 2019 Egyptian protests
- 2019–2021 Iraqi protests
- 17 October Revolution
- Hirak (Algeria)
- 2021 Tunisian protests
- 2021 Palestinian protests

=== 2019–2022 Latin American protests ===
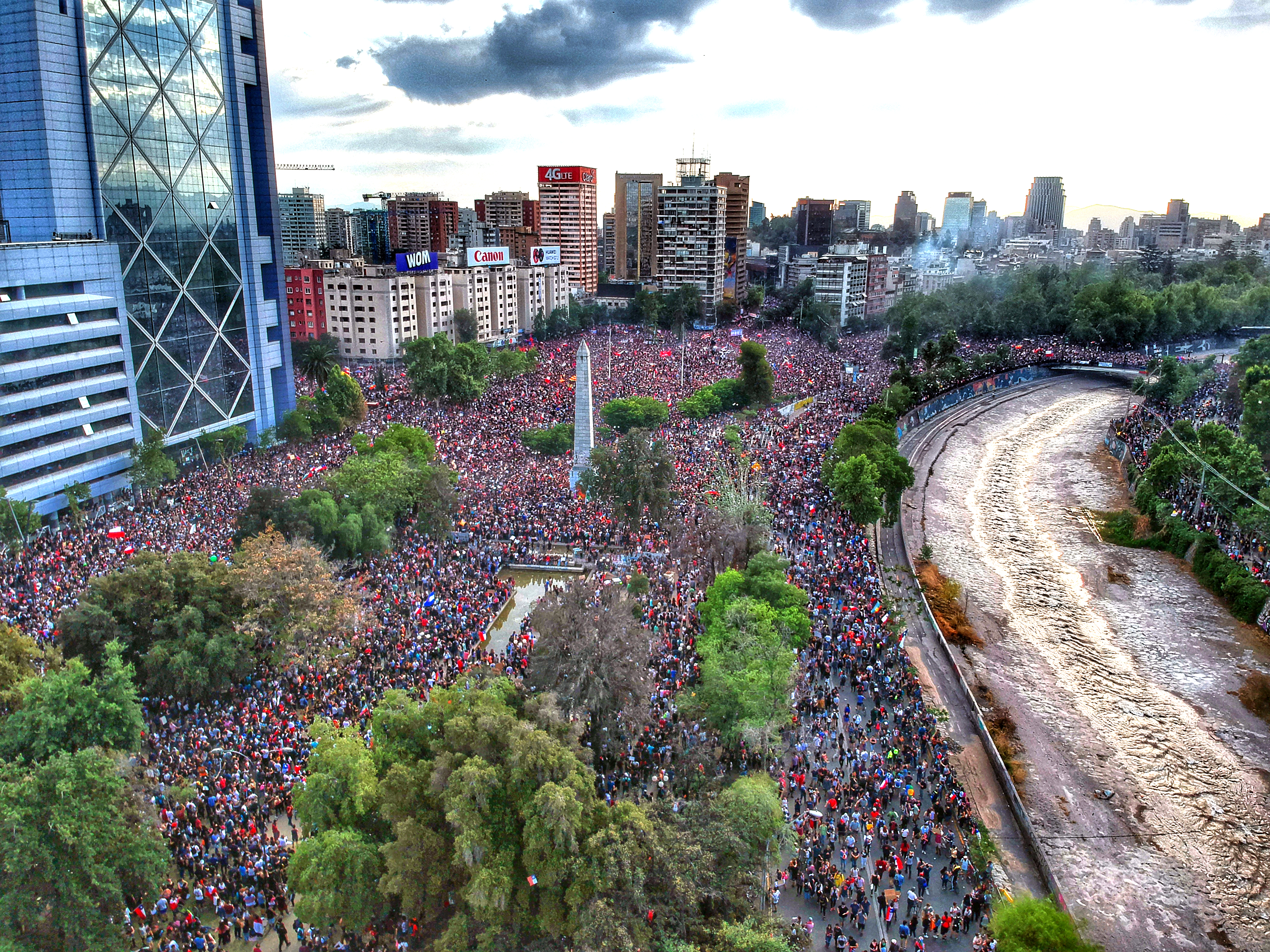
"Marcha Más Grande de Chile" during the 2019–2021 Chilean protests.

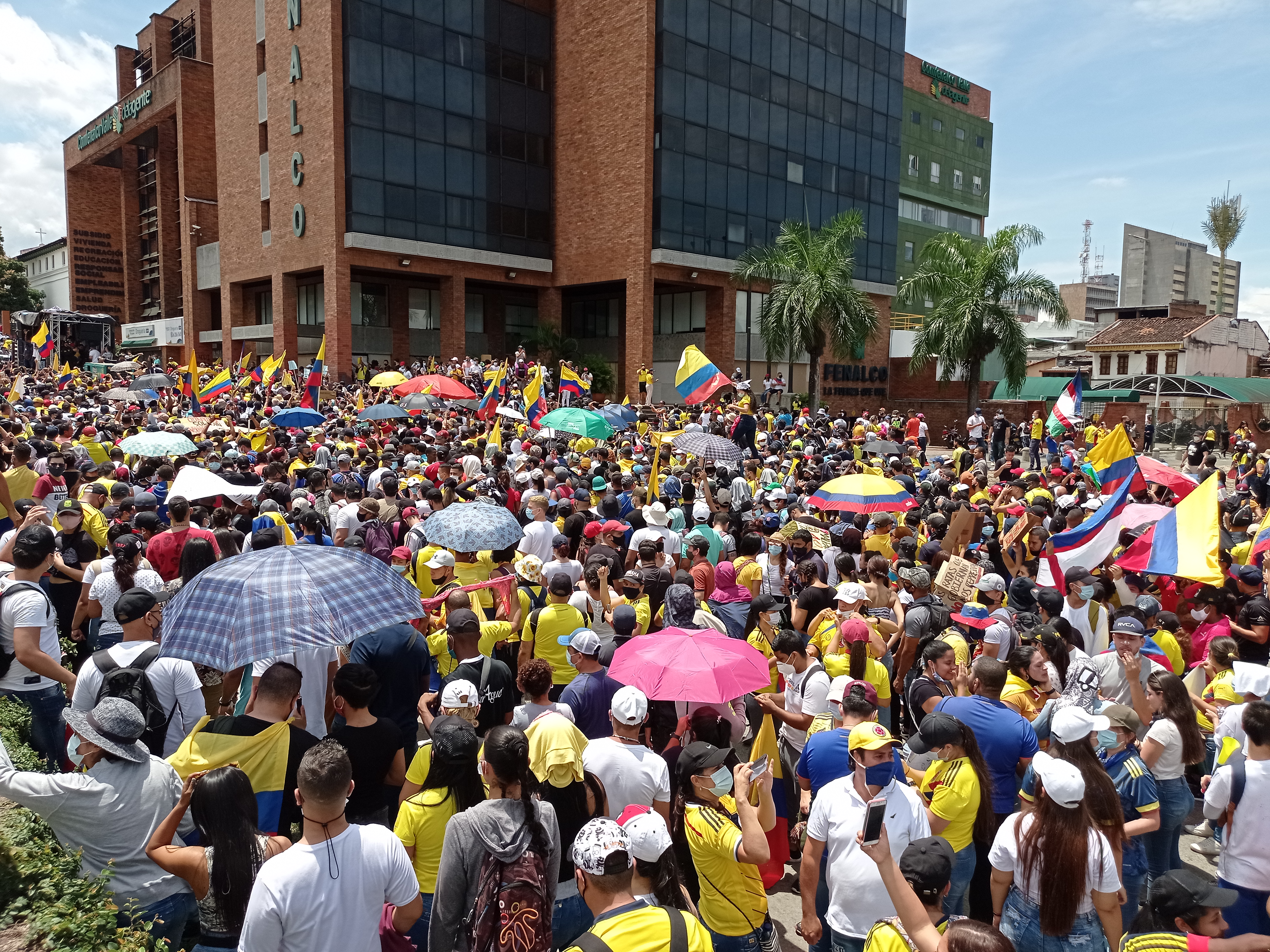
Protesters gather during the 2021 Colombian protests.

- 2018–2022 Haitian protests
- 2019 Bolivian revolution
- 2019 Venezuelan protests
- Telegramgate
- 2019 Ecuadorian protests
- 2019–2020 Colombian protests
- Social Outburst (Chile)
- 2020 Dominican protests
- 2020 Bolivian protests
- 2020 Peruvian protests
- 2020–2021 Argentine protests
- 2021 Paraguayan protests
- 2021 Colombian protests
- 2021 Cuban protests
- 2021 Brazilian protests
- 2022 Ecuadorian protests
- 2022 Panamanian protests
- Peruvian protests (2022–2023)

=== Gen Z protests (2020–present) ===
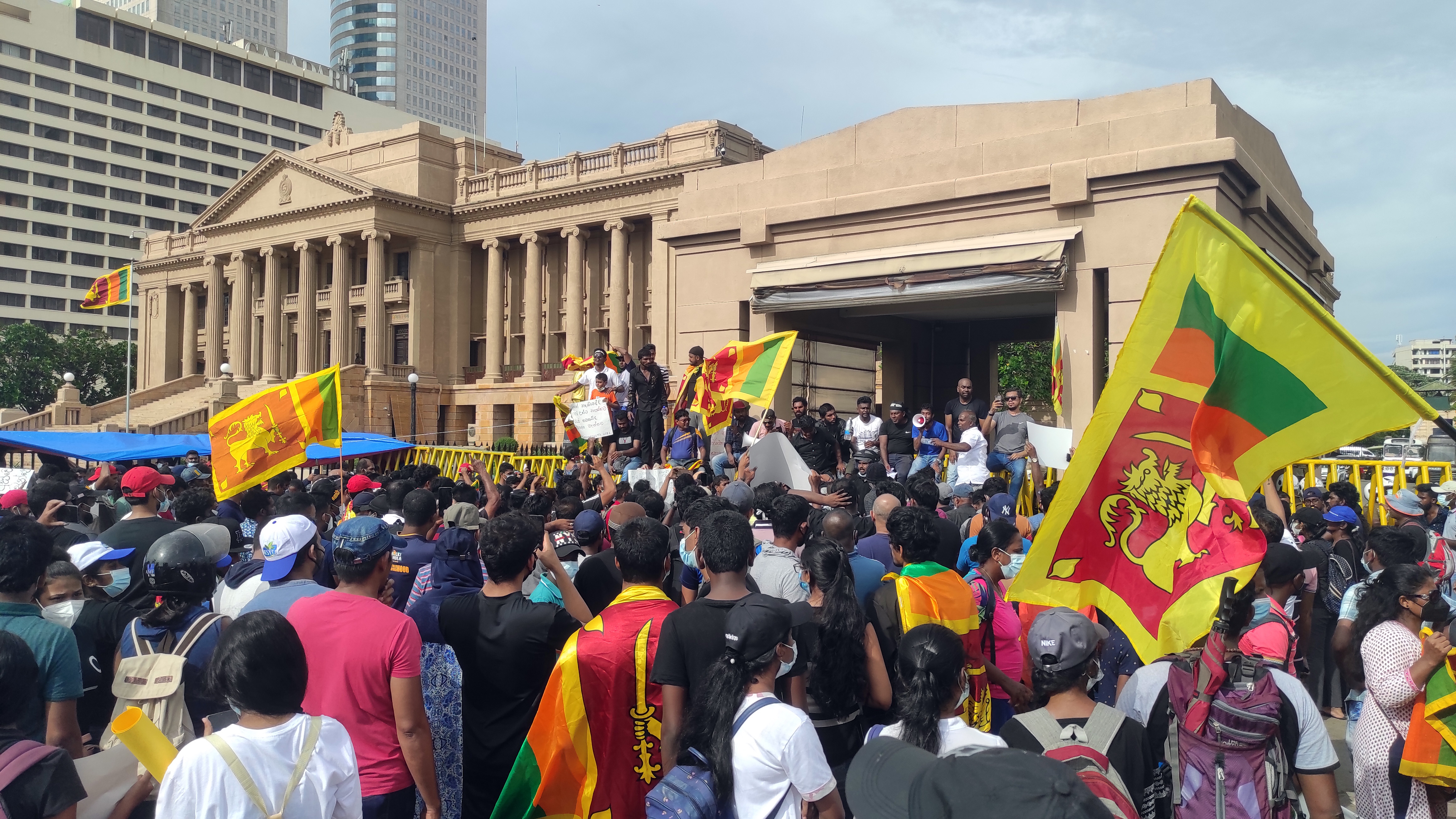
Sri Lankans protesting in front of the presidential office in Colombo.

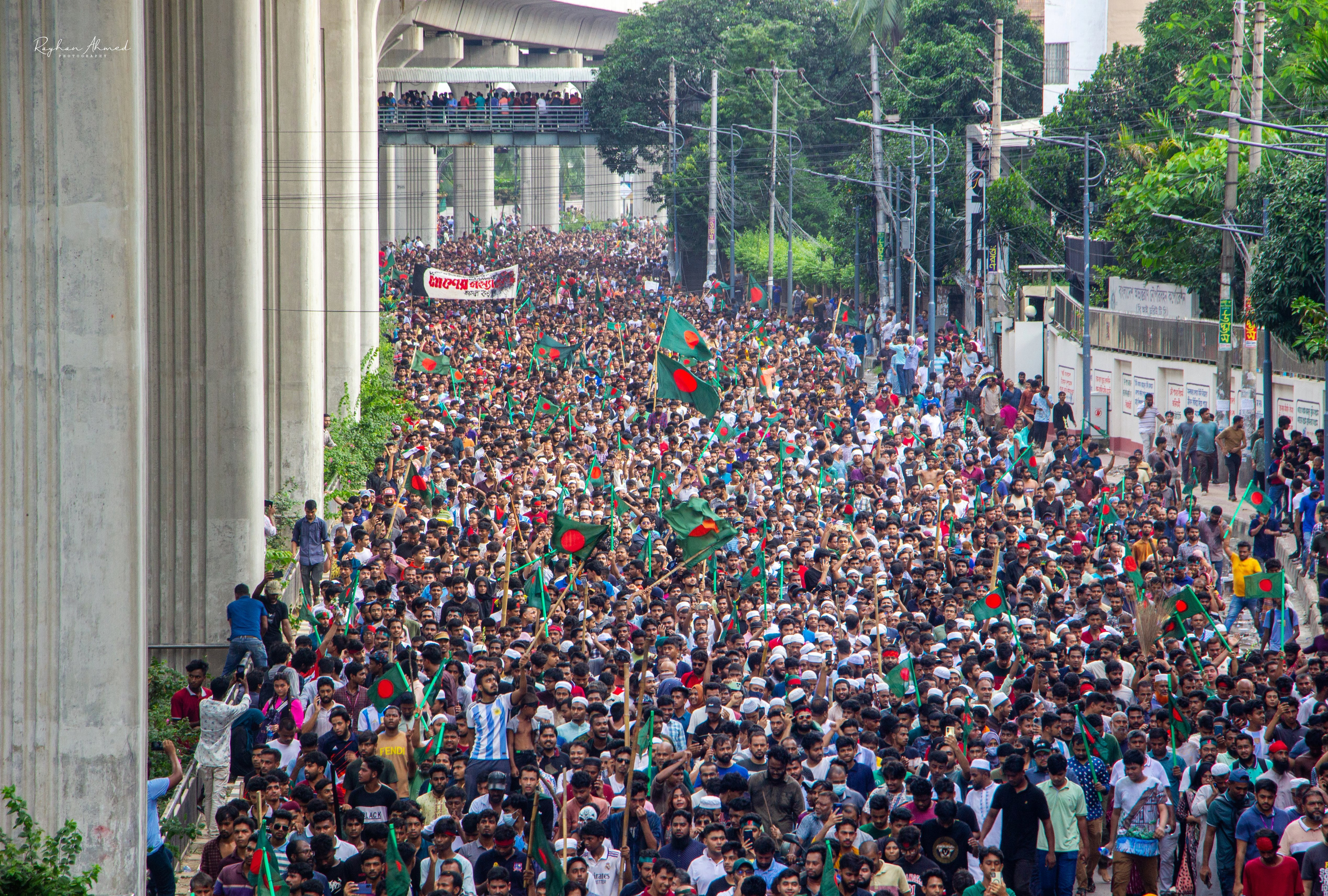
The victory march by Bangladeshi protestors after resignation of Sheikh Hasina

2020 protests

- End SARS

2022 protests

- Aragalaya

2024 protests

- July Uprising
- 2024 Hungarian protests
- Kenya Finance Bill protests

2025 protests in Africa

- 2025 Cameroonian protests
- 2025 Malagasy protests
- 2025 Moroccan Gen Z protests
- 2025 Mozambican protests
- 2025 Tanzanian election protests
- 2025 Togolese Gen Z protests

2025 protests in Asia

- 2025 Burmese protests
- 2025 Japanese protests
- 2025 Korean protests
- 2025 Indonesian protests
- 2025 Oust Anwar rally
- 2025 Maldivian protests
- 2025 Mongolian protests
- 2025 Nepalese Gen Z protests
- 2025 Philippine protests
- 2025 Thai protests
- 2025 Timor-Leste protests

2025 protests in Europe

- 2025 Bulgarian protests
- Bloquons tout
- 2025 Georgian protests
- 2025 Greek protests
- 2025 Italian protests
- 2025 Macedonian protests
- 2025 Romanian protests
- 2025 Serbian protests
- 2025 Turkish protests
- Chalk Revolution

2025 protests in Latin America

- 2025 Colombian protests
- 2025 Mexican protests
- 2025 Paraguayan protests
- 2025 Peruvian protests

2025 protests in the Middle East

- 2025 Iranian protests

2026 protests

- 2026 Ugandan protests
- Flamingo Revolution (Albania)

=== Other ===
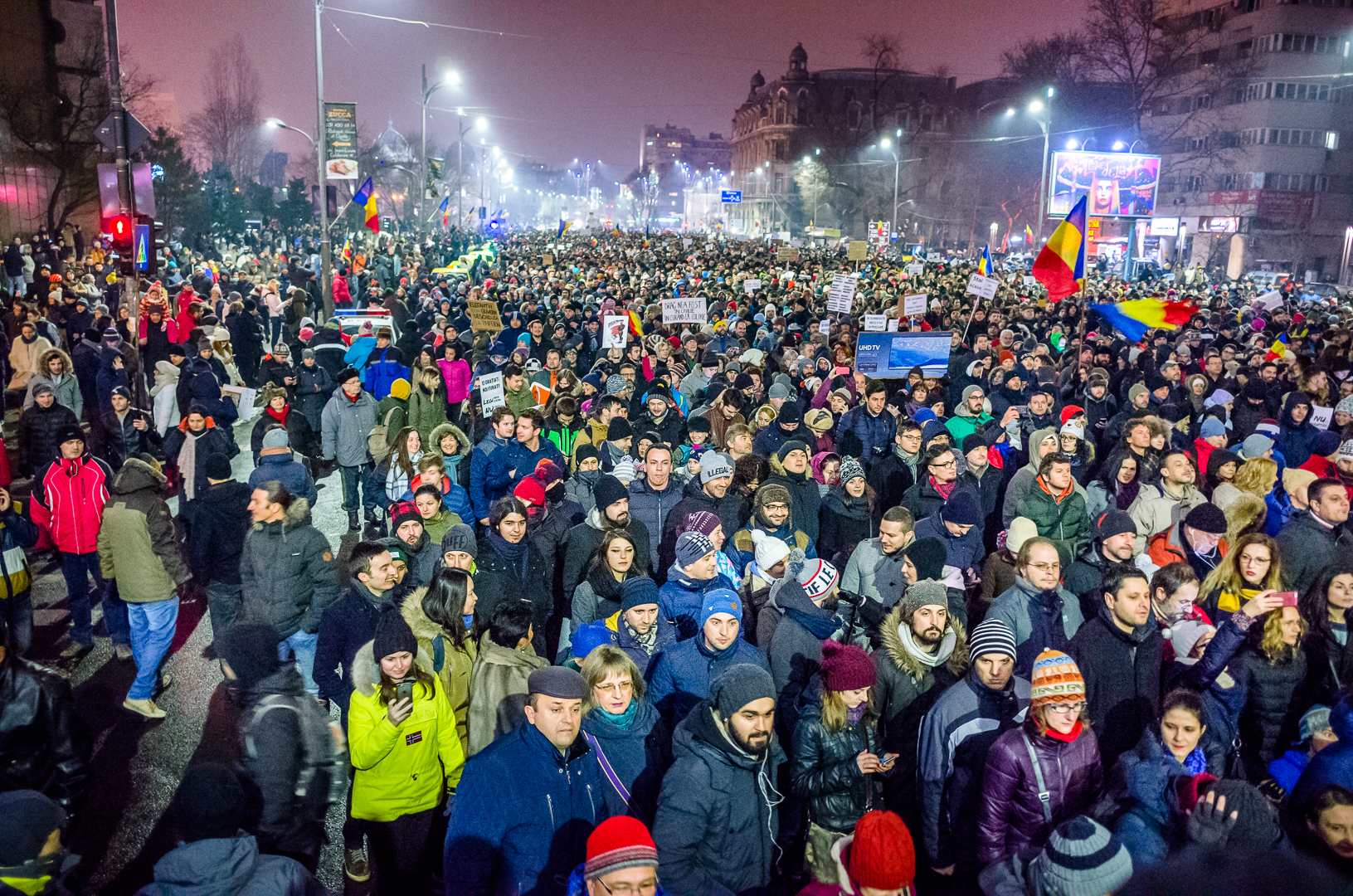
2017–2018 Romanian protests against government policies and corruption

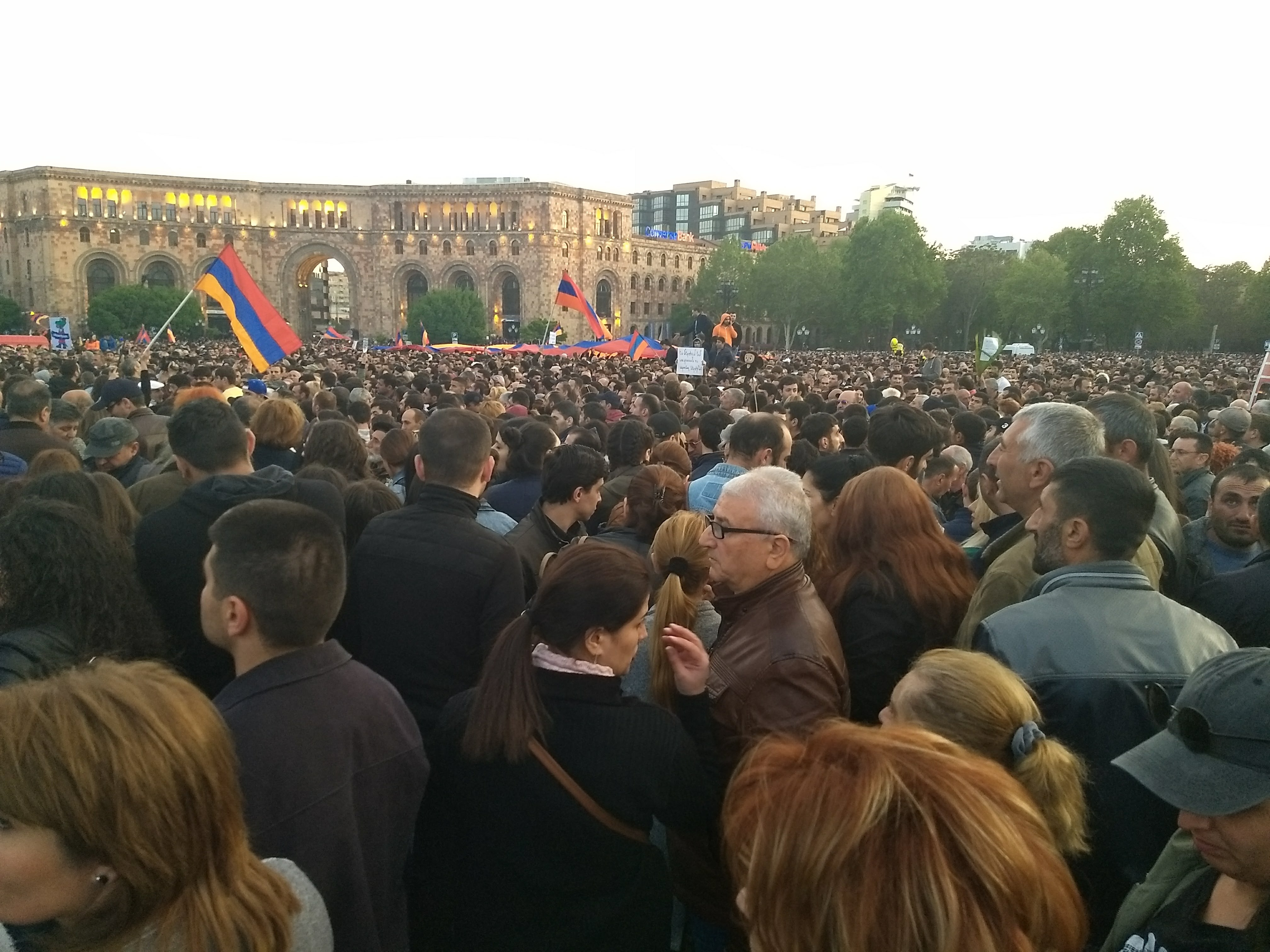
2018 Armenian revolution

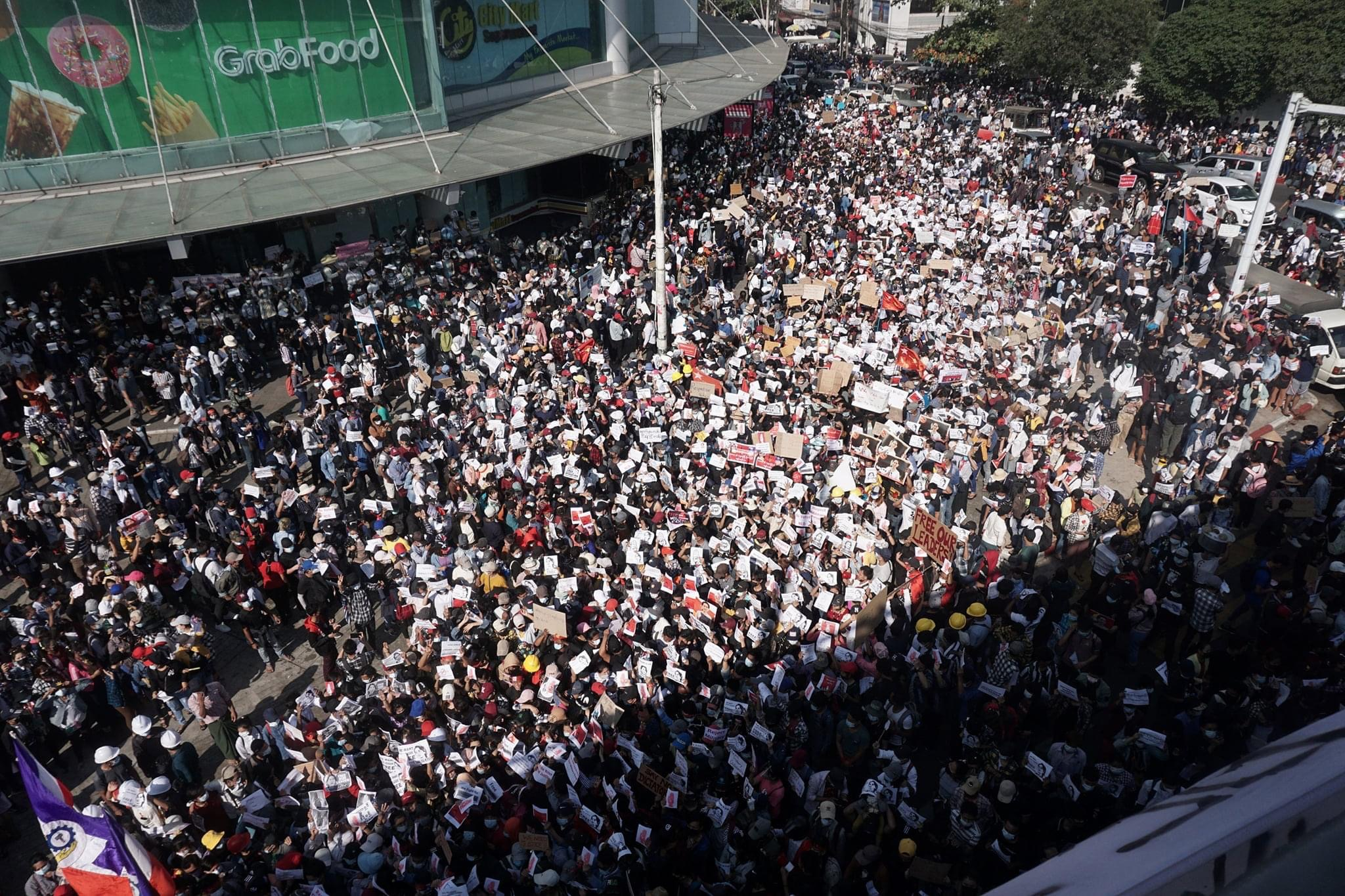
Protests broke out across Myanmar after the military coup d'état.

- (2001, Philippines): Second EDSA Revolution
- (2001, Philippines): EDSA III
- (2004–2019, Syria, Iraq, Turkey): Rojava Revolution
- 2010 Kyrgyz Revolution
- (2013–2014, Ukraine): Euromaidan
- (2014): Abkhazian Revolution
- 2014 Burkina Faso uprising
- 2017–2019 Romanian protests
- 2018 Armenian Revolution
- 2019–2020 Hong Kong protests
- 2020–2021 Belarusian protests
- United States racial unrest (2020–2023)
- 2020–2021 Bulgarian protests
- 2020–2021 Armenian protests
- 2021 Greek protests
- 2022 Armenian protests
- Myanmar protests (2021–present)
- 2022 Albanian protests
- 2022 Karakalpak protests
- 2022 North Macedonia protests
- 2022 Sierra Leone protests
- Mahsa Amini protests
- 2022 Mongolian protests
- 2023 Armenian protests
- 2024 Citizenship Amendment Act Protests in India
- 2025 Gaza Strip anti-Hamas protests

== Specific issues ==
=== Against elections ===
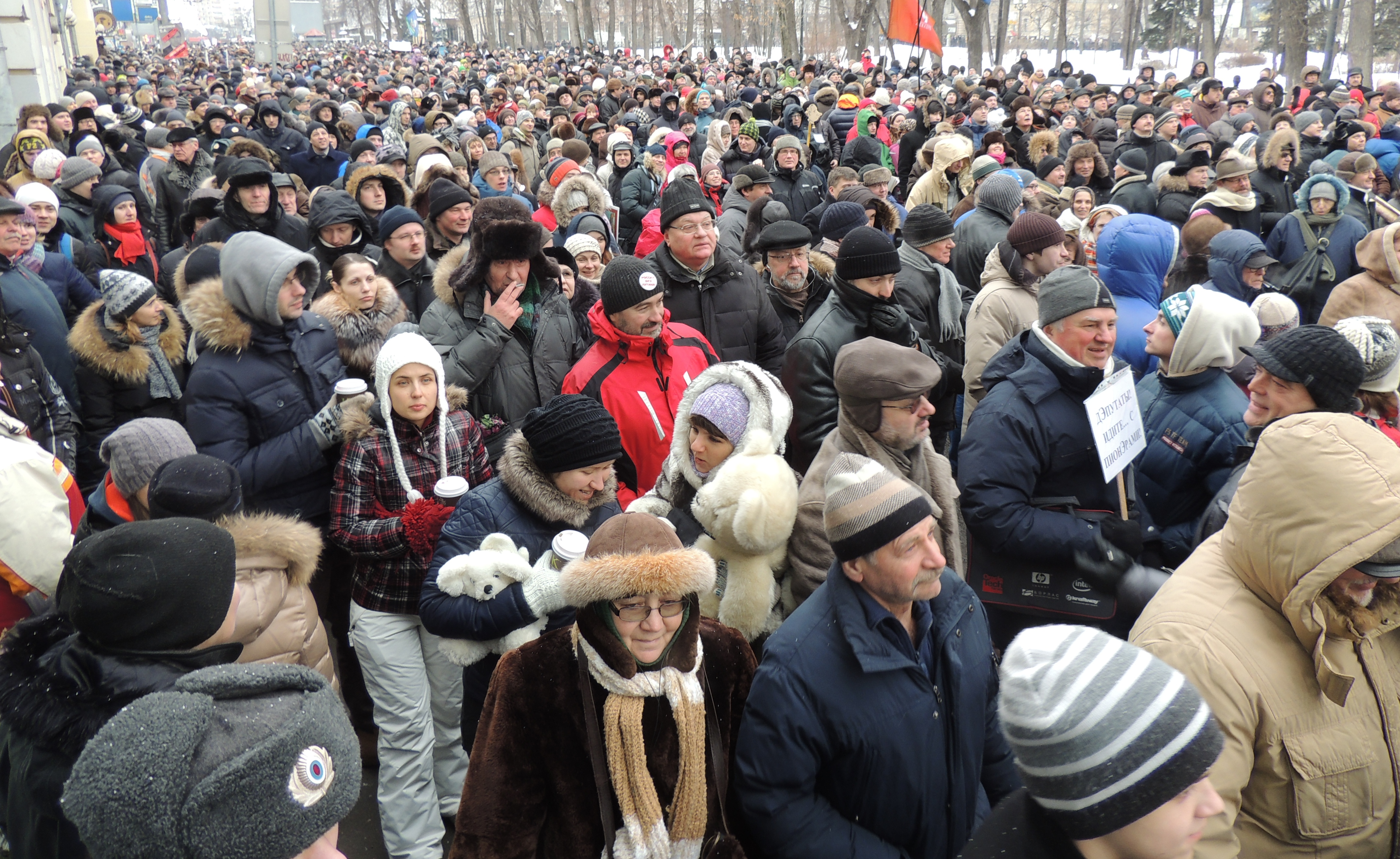
2011–2013 Russian protests

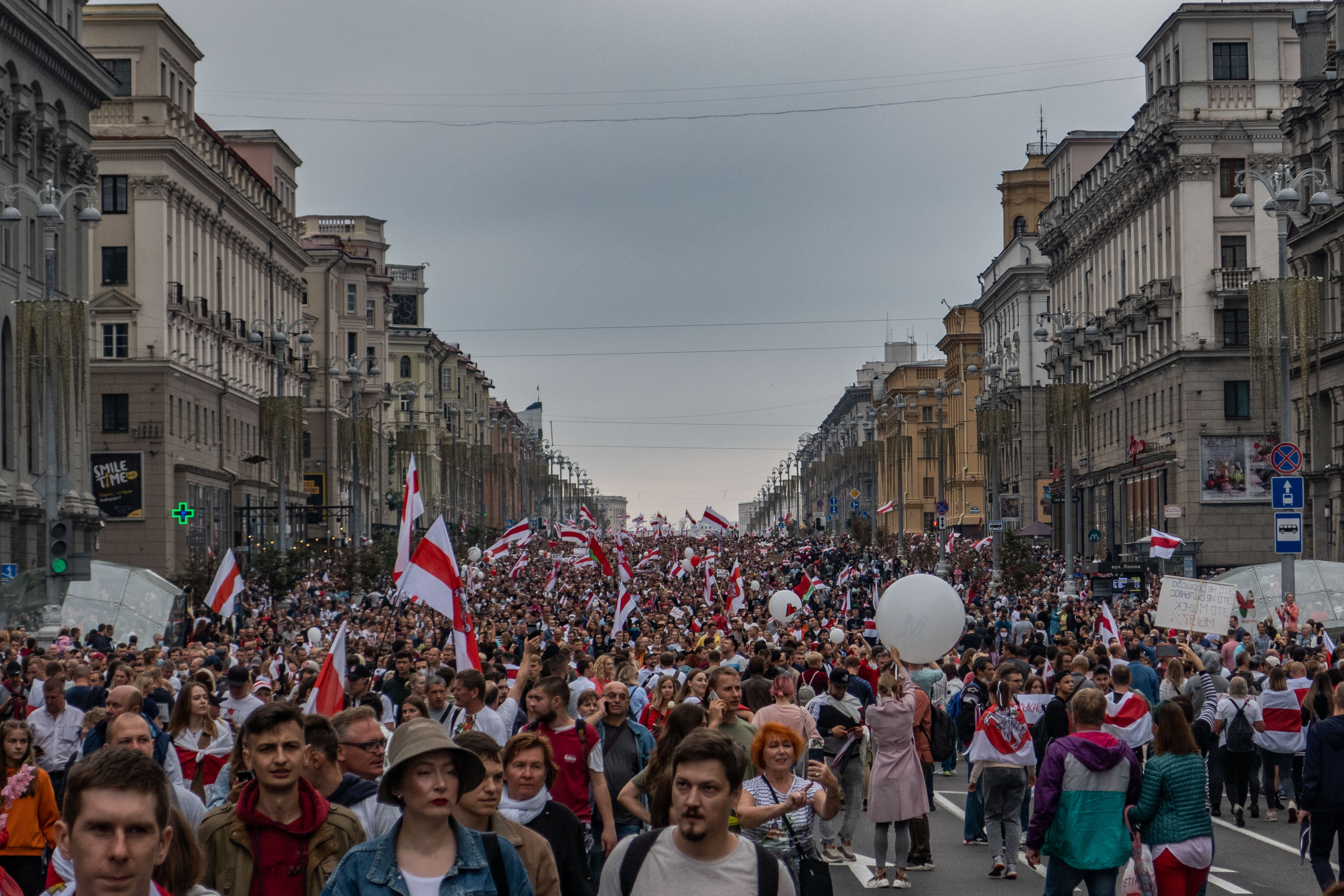
2020-2021 Belarusian protests

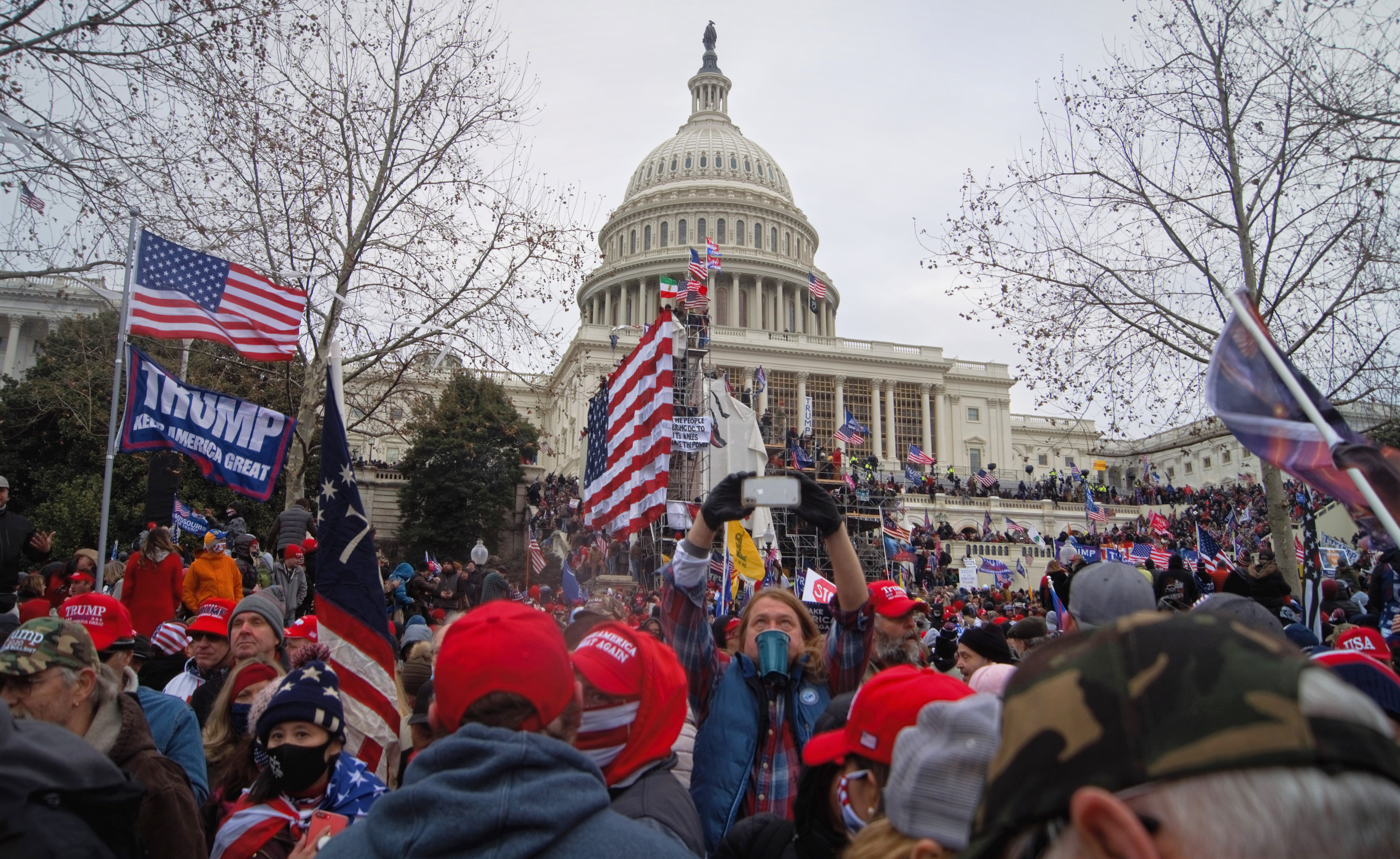
January 6 United States Capitol attack.

- 2003–2004 Armenian protests
- Protests against Faure Gnassingbé (Togo, 2005–2021)
- Jeans Revolution (Belarus, 2006)
- 2006 Mexican political crisis
- 2008 Armenian presidential election protests
- April 2009 Moldovan parliamentary election protests
- 2009 Iranian presidential election protests
- 2010 Ucayali protests (Peru)
- 2011–2013 Russian protests
- Yo Soy 132 (Mexico, 2012)
- 2012 NIS public opinion manipulation scandal (South Korea)
- 2013 Venezuelan presidential election protests
- 2013 Malaysian general election protest
- Protests against Donald Trump (United States, 2016–2020)
- Demonstrations in support of Donald Trump
- 2016–2017 Brazilian protests
- 2017 Serbian protests
- 2017–2018 Honduran protests
- Venezuelan presidential crisis
- 2018 Armenian Revolution
- May 2019 Jakarta protests and riots
- 2019 Bolivian protests
- 2020 Kyrgyz Revolution
- 2020–2021 Belarusian protests
- January 6 United States Capitol attack
- 2021 Russian election protests
- 2022–2023 Brazilian election protests
- 2024 Indonesian local election law protests
- 2024–2025 Mozambican protests

=== Anti-austerity ===
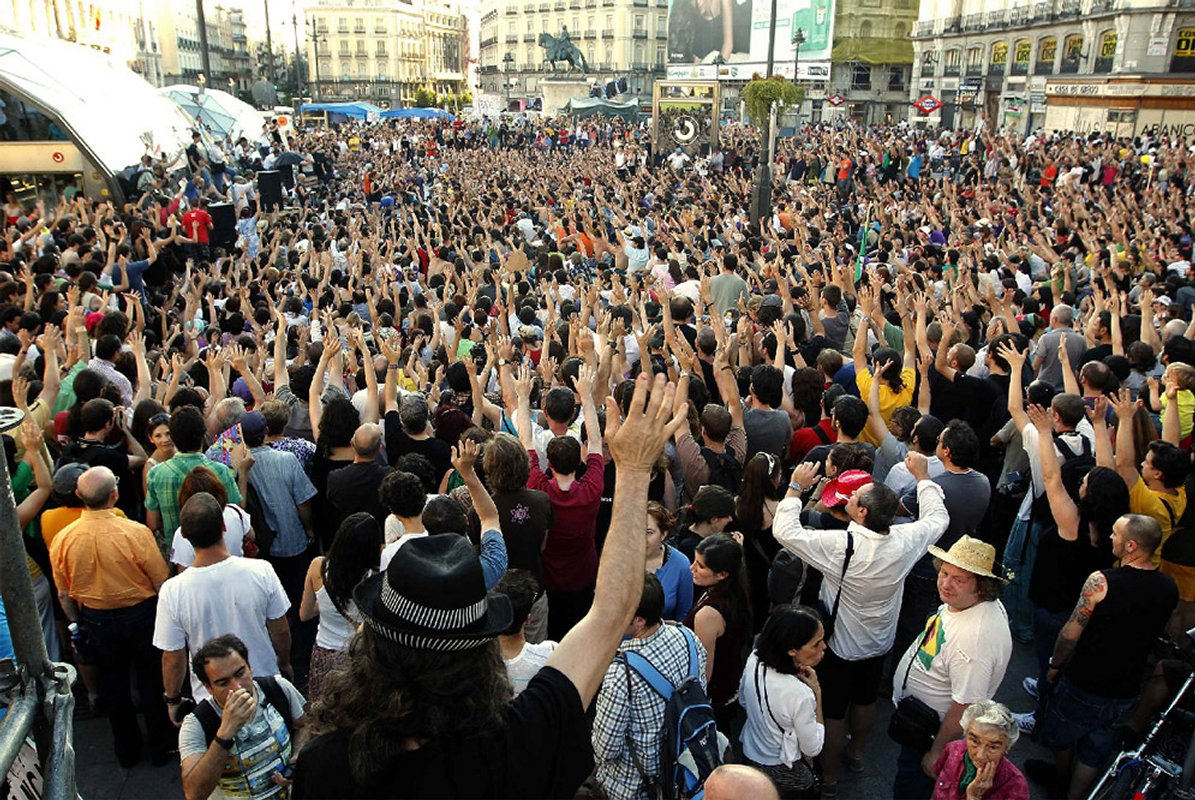
Anti-austerity movement in Spain

- 2016 Newfoundland and Labrador budget protests (Canada)
- Anti-austerity movement in Greece
- Anti-austerity movement in Ireland
- 2011 Rome demonstration
- 2012 Sicilian protests
- 2013 Italian social protests
- Anti-austerity movement in Portugal
- Anti-austerity movement in Spain
- Asturian miners' strike of 2012
- Anti-austerity movement in the United Kingdom
- 2019–2021 Lebanese protests

=== Anti-war ===
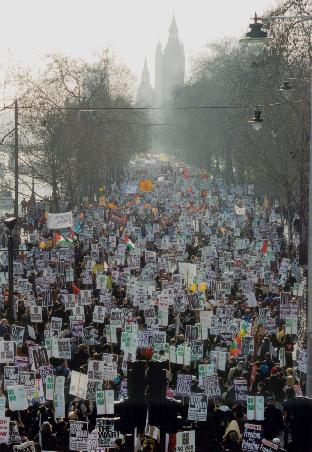
Protest against the Iraq War in London on 15 February 2003

- Protests against the war in Afghanistan
- Protests against the Iraq War
- Protests regarding the Russo-Georgian War
- Protests against the 2011 military intervention in Libya
- 2014 anti-war protests in Russia
- Protests against the Sri Lankan civil war
  - Protests in Canada against the Sri Lankan civil war
  - 2013 anti-Sri Lanka protests
- Protests against the 2021 Israel–Palestine crisis
- Protests against the Russo-Ukrainian war (2022–present)
- Gaza war protests
- Israeli hostage deal protests

=== Arab Summer (Post-Arab Spring protests) ===
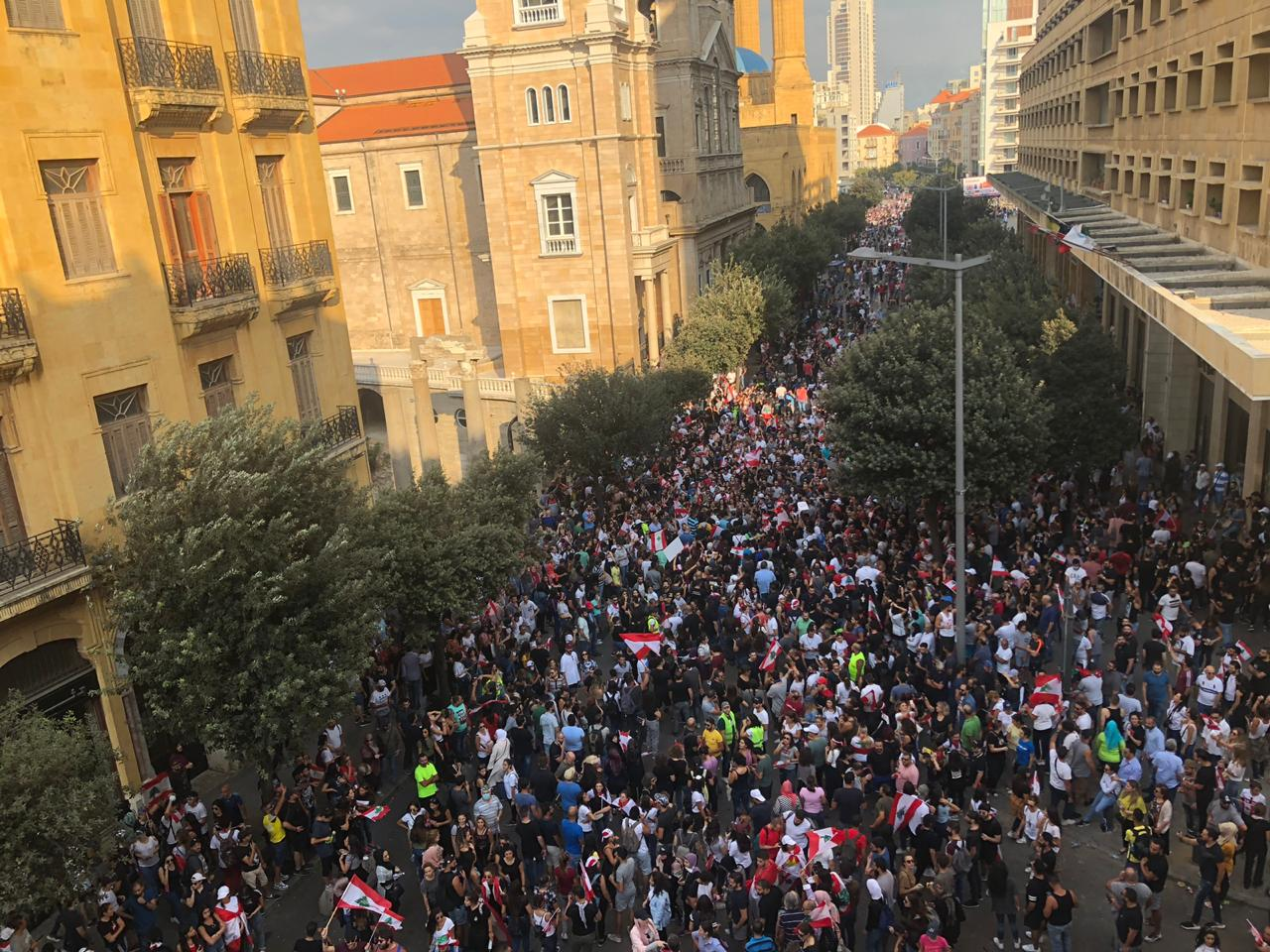
17 October Revolution in Lebanon.

- 2016 Tunisian protests
- 2018 Tunisian protests
- 2013–2014 Tunisian political crisis
- 2019 Egyptian protests
- 2020 Egyptian protests
- 2012–2013 Egyptian protests
- Post-coup unrest in Egypt (2013–2014)
- 2019–2021 Algerian protests
- 2018 Jordanian protests
- 2018–2019 Gaza border protests
- 2019 Gaza economic protests
- Sudanese revolution
- 2019–2022 Sudanese protests
- 2019–2021 Lebanese protests
- 2015–2016 Lebanese protests
- 2019–2021 Iraqi protests
- 2012–2013 Iraqi protests
- 2015–2018 Iraqi protests
- 2020 Libyan protests
- Bahrain Tamarod
- Hirak Rif Movement
- 2021 Tunisian protests
- 2025 Gaza Strip anti-Hamas protests

=== Autonomy or independence ===
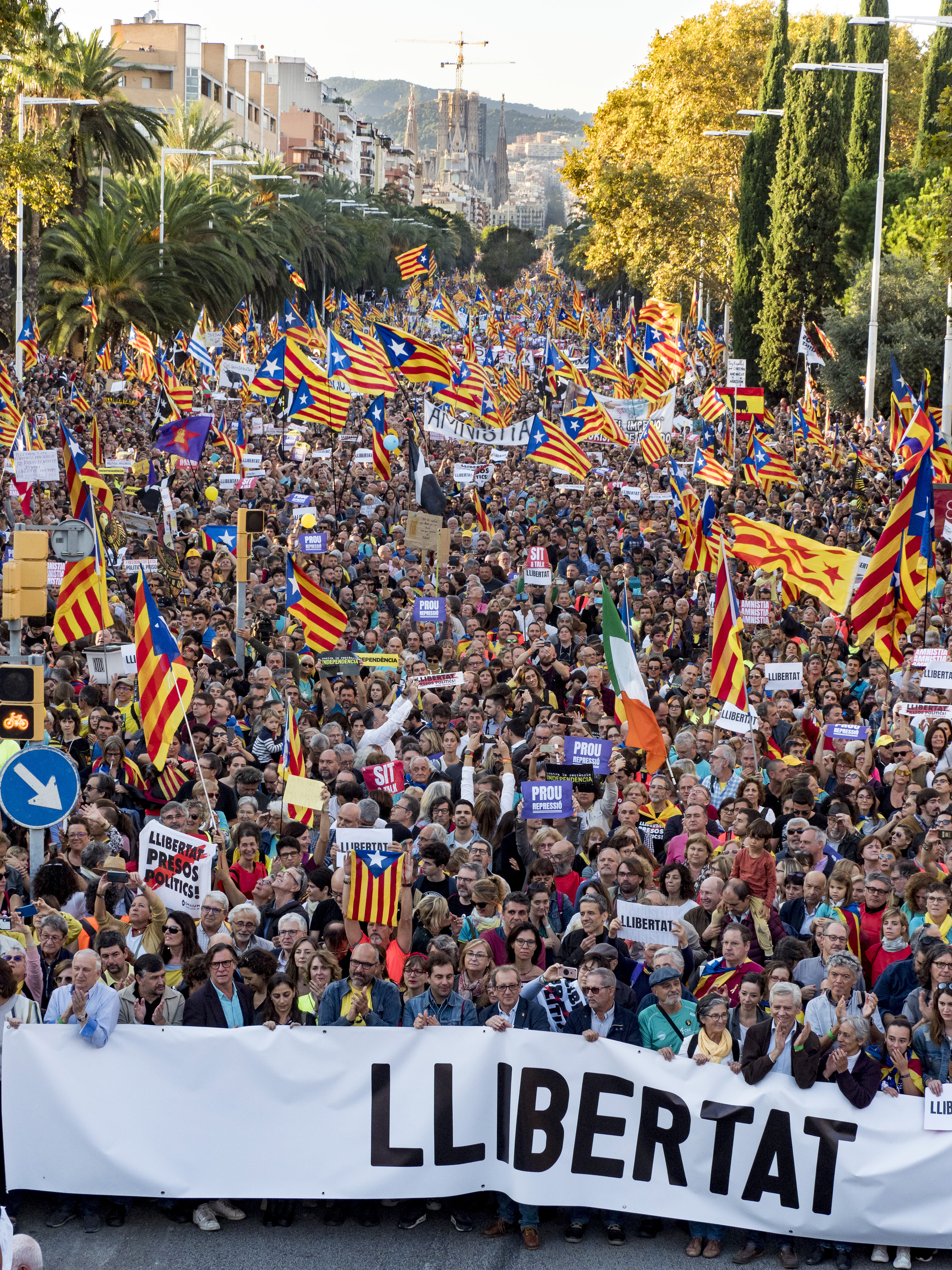
Supporters of Catalan independence protest in Barcelona in October 2019

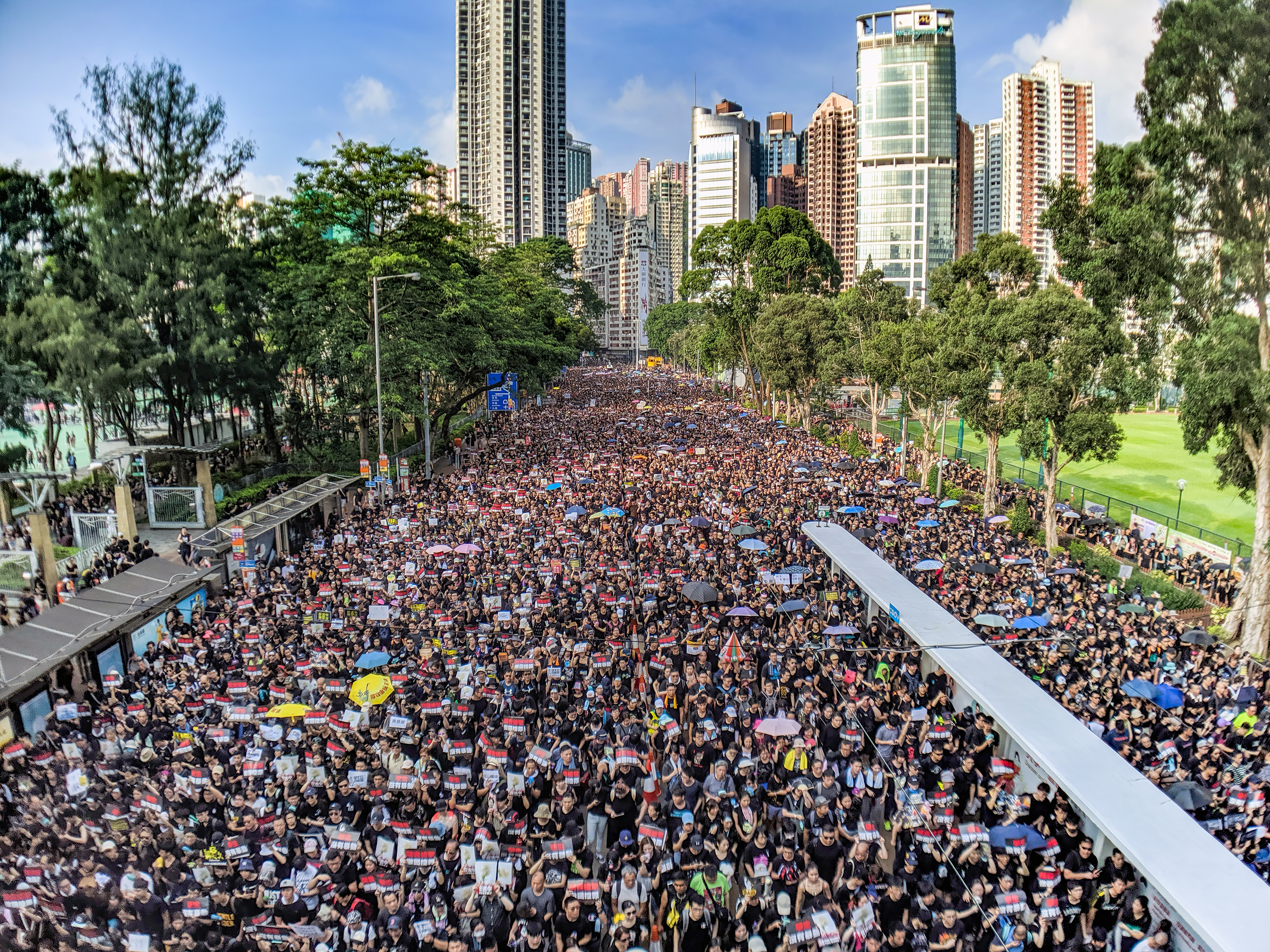
2019–2020 Hong Kong protests

- 2005 Ahvaz unrest (Iran)
- Catalonia
  - 2010 Catalan autonomy protest
  - 2012 Catalan independence demonstration
  - Catalan Way (2013)
  - Catalan Way 2014
  - Free Way to the Catalan Republic (2015)
  - Go ahead, Catalan Republic (2016)
  - National Day for Yes (2017)
  - 2017 Catalan general strike
  - Wake Up Europe! (2017)
  - Fem la República Catalana (2018)
  - 2019 Catalan general strike
  - 2019 Catalan protests
- 2014 Russian annexation of Crimea
- 2014 pro-Russian unrest in Ukraine
- Hong Kong
  - 2014 Hong Kong protests
  - 2016 Mong Kok civil unrest
  - 2019–2020 Hong Kong protests
- 2016–2017 Kashmir unrest (India)
- Kurdistan
  - December 2009 Kurdish protests in Turkey
  - 2011 Kurdish protests in Iraq
  - 2011–2012 Kurdish protests in Turkey
  - 2014 Kobanî protests
- 2019 Papua protests (Indonesia)
- March and Rally for Scottish Independence (2012–2013)
- Hirak Rif Movement (Morocco)
- Telangana movement (India)
- Gdeim Izik protest camp (Morocco)
- 2024 New Caledonia unrest (France)
- Ladakh protests (India)

=== Climate ===
- Extinction Rebellion (XR)
- School strike for climate / Fridays for Future (FFF)
- 2021–2022 Serbian environmental protests

=== Pro-life ===
- March for Life and Family (Poland, 2007–2009)
- March for Life (Prague) (Czech Republic, 2001–2014)
- March for Life (Paris) (France, 2005–2019)
- March for Life (Washington, D.C.) (United States, 2000–2021)
- Salvemos las dos Vidas (Argentina, 2017–2020)

=== Women's rights ===
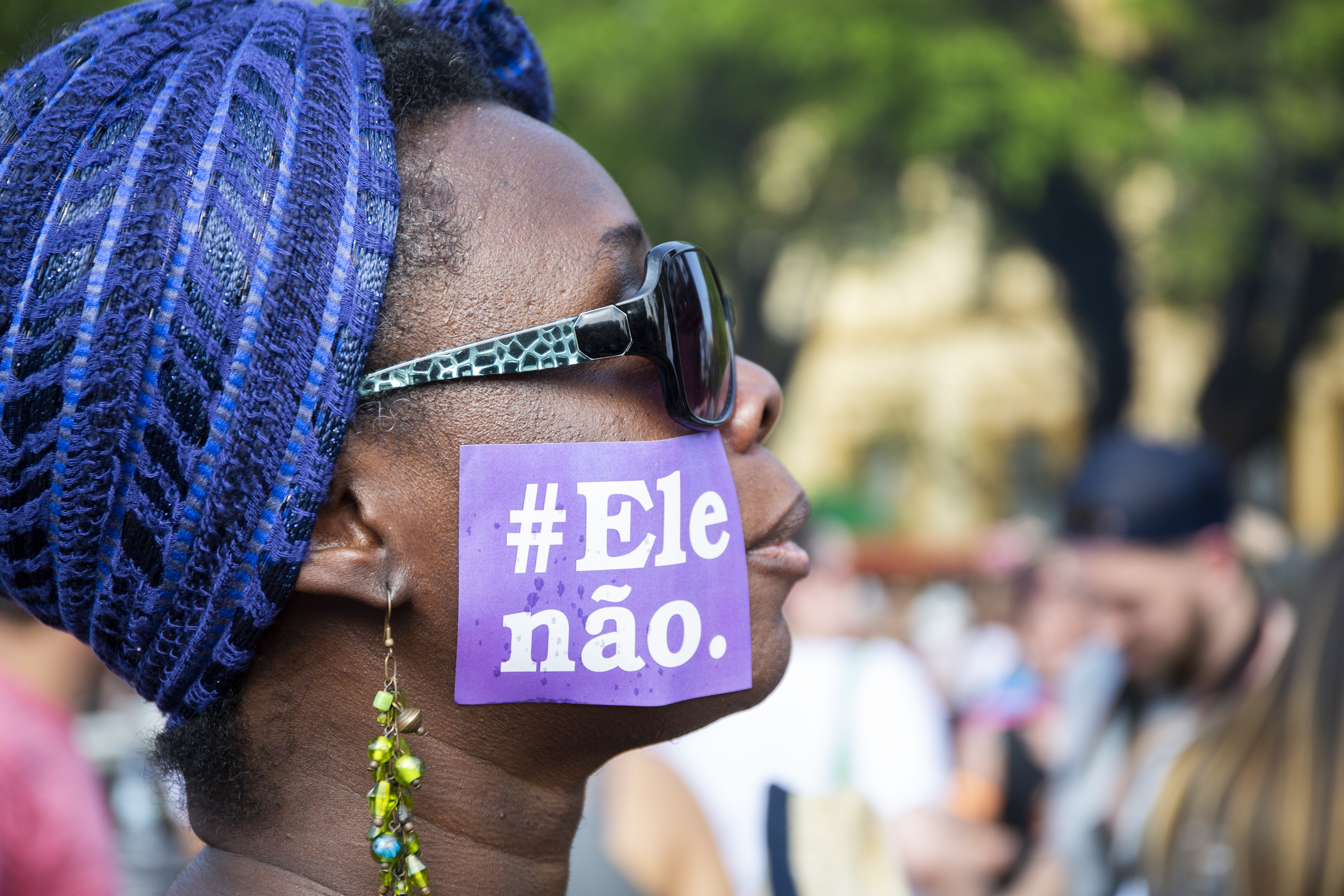
"Ele Não" protester in Porto Alegre, Brazil

- March for Women's Lives (2004) (United States)
- Ni una menos (Argentina, 2015–2021)
- NiUnaMenos (Peru, 2016)
- 2017 Women's March (United States)
- Protests against Executive Order 13769 (United States, 2017)
- Ele Não movement (Brazil, 2018)
- 2018 Chilean feminist protests and strikes
- It also happens here (Mexico, 2018)
- 2018 Spanish women's strike
- 2018 Women's March (United States)
- 2019 Women's March (United States)
- Vanitha Mathil (India, 2019)
- 2019 Swiss women's strike (Switzerland)
- 2019 feminist protests in Mexico
- 2020 feminist protests in Mexico
- 2020–2021 women's strike protests in Poland
- Mahsa Amini Protests (Iran, September 2022)

== Student protests ==
• 2026 French student protest

- (Canada): 2005 Quebec student protests
- 2006 student protests in Chile
- 2007 Brazilian student protests
- 2007–2009 university protests in France
- (2007, South Africa): #FeesMustFall
- (2008, Netherlands): Dutch pupil strike
- 2008 student protests in Chile
- 2009 student protests in Austria
- 2009 student protests in Croatia
- 2009 German student protests
- (Ireland): 2010 student protest in Dublin
- 2010 United Kingdom student protests
- 2010–2011 University of Puerto Rico strikes
- 2011 Colombian student protests
- 2011–2013 Chilean student protests
- (2012, Hong Kong): Moral and National Education controversy
- (Canada): 2012 Quebec student protests
- 2012 Spanish general educational strike
- 2014 Hong Kong class boycott campaign
- 2014, Hong Kong Umbrella Movement
- (2014, Taiwan): Sunflower Student Movement
- (2015, South Africa): #RhodesMustFall
- (Canada): 2015 Quebec student protests
- 2015 Bangladesh student protests against VAT on education
- (2015, Taiwan): Anti-Black Box Curriculum Movement
- (2015, Malaysia): Tangkap Najib rally
- (2015–2016, Japan): SEALDs (Students Emergency Action for Liberal Democracy)
- (2015–2016, United States of America): 2015–2016 University of Missouri protests
- 2016 student protests in Brazil
- 2018 Bangladesh road-safety protests
- (Mexico): 2018 UNAM protests
- 2018 student protests in Colombia
- 2018–2019 student protest in Albania
- 2019 student protests in Brazil
- 2019 student protests in Costa Rica
- 2019 medical student protests in Ecuador
- (Turkey): 2021 Boğaziçi University protests
- September 2022 Iranian protests
- 2022 Indonesian student protests
- 2024 pro-Palestinian protests on university campuses
- 2025 Indonesian student protests
- 2025 Nepalese Gen Z protests
- 2024-present Serbian student demonstrations

== Other protests by country ==
=== International ===
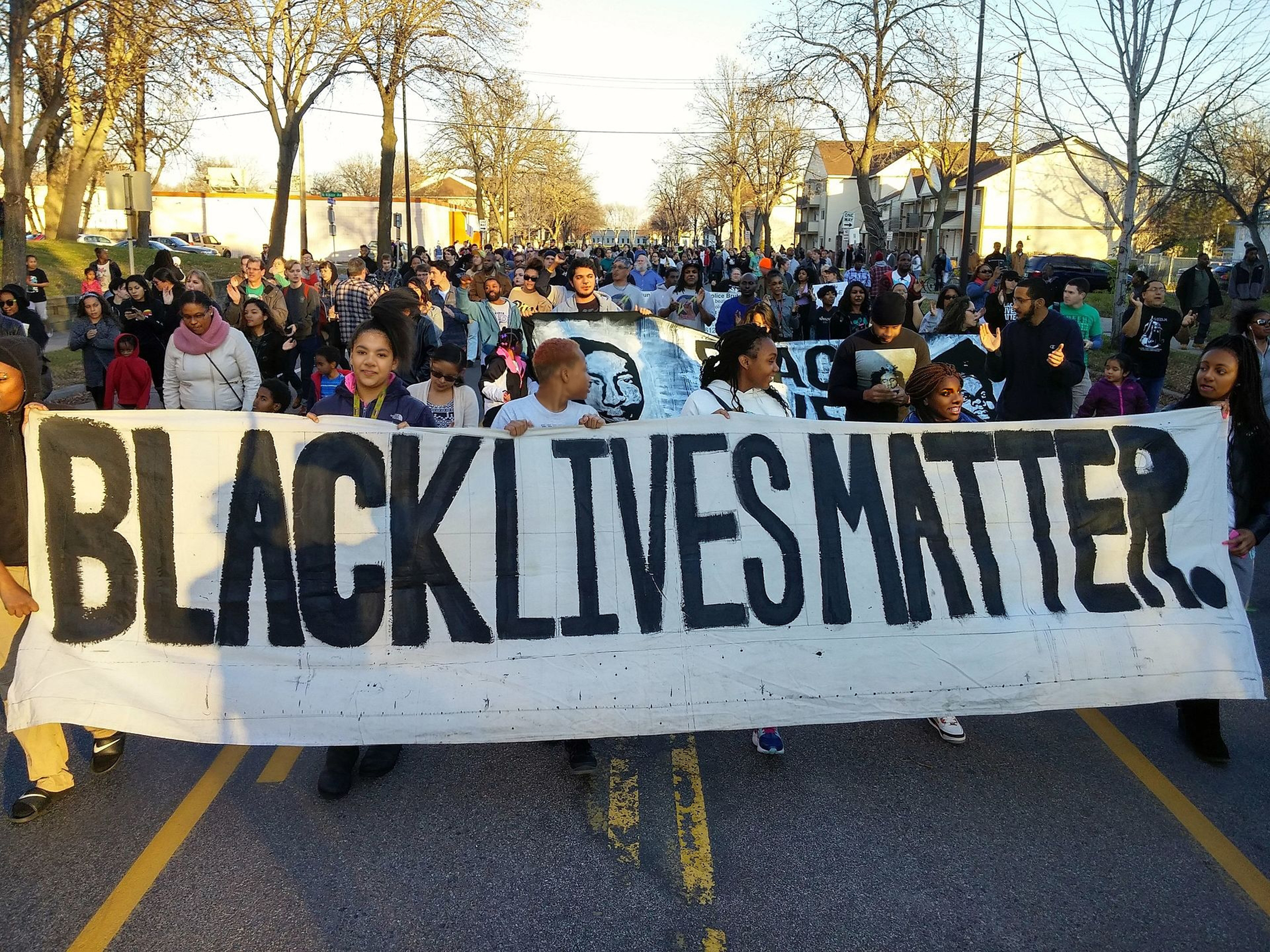
Black Lives Matter protest in Minneapolis

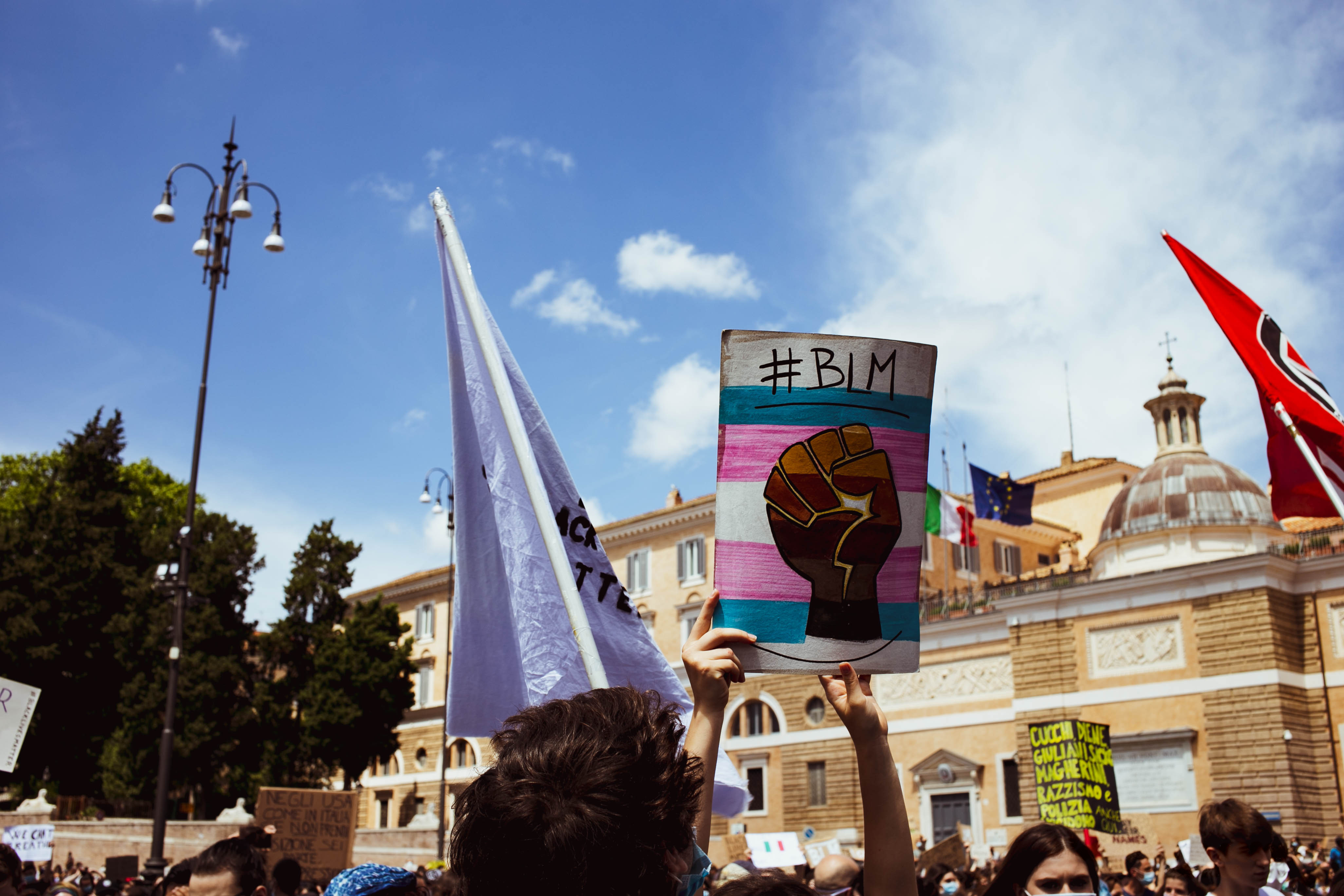
Black Lives Matter Protest in Rome on 7 June 2020

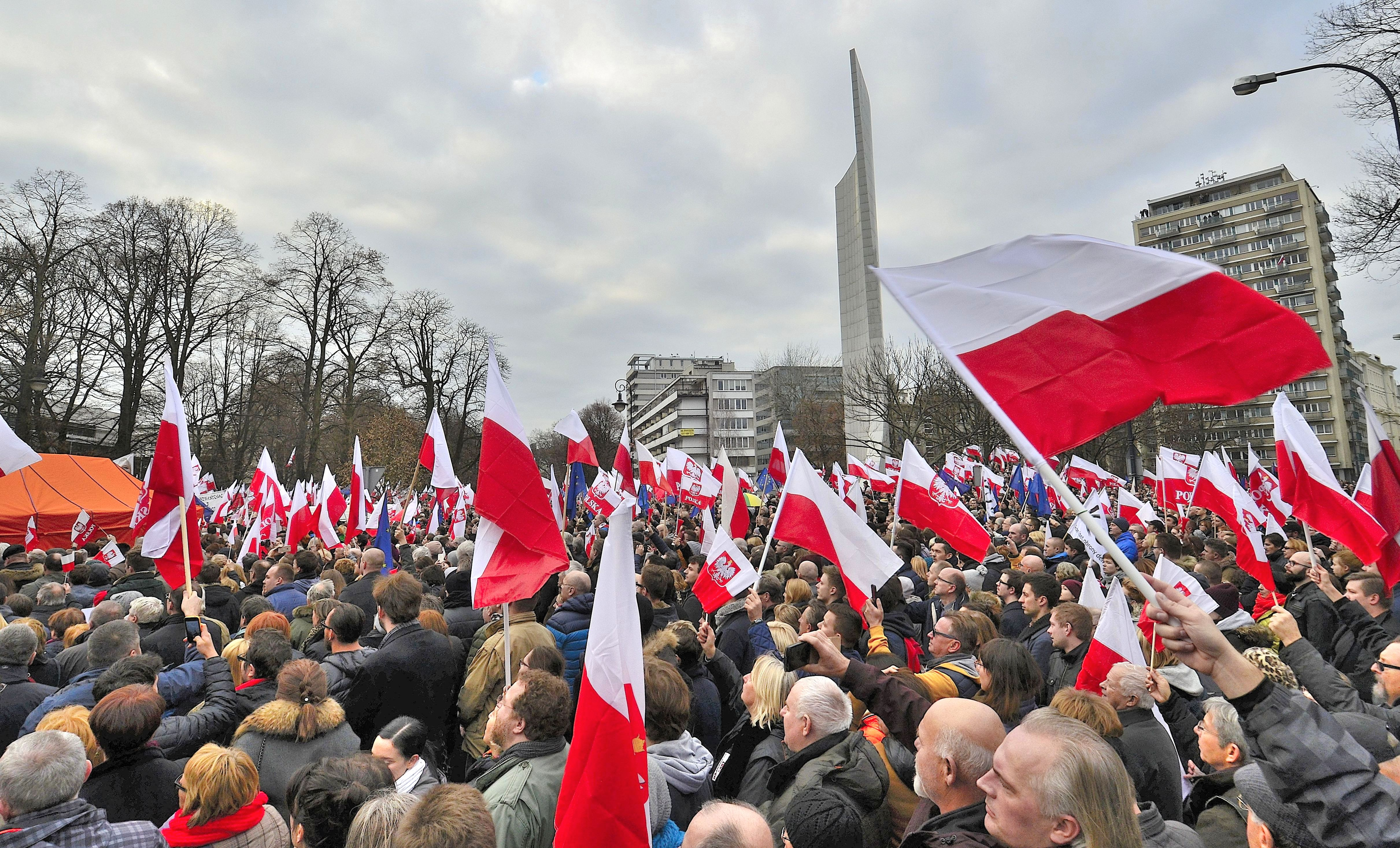
Protest against the Polish government led by the Law and Justice (PiS) party

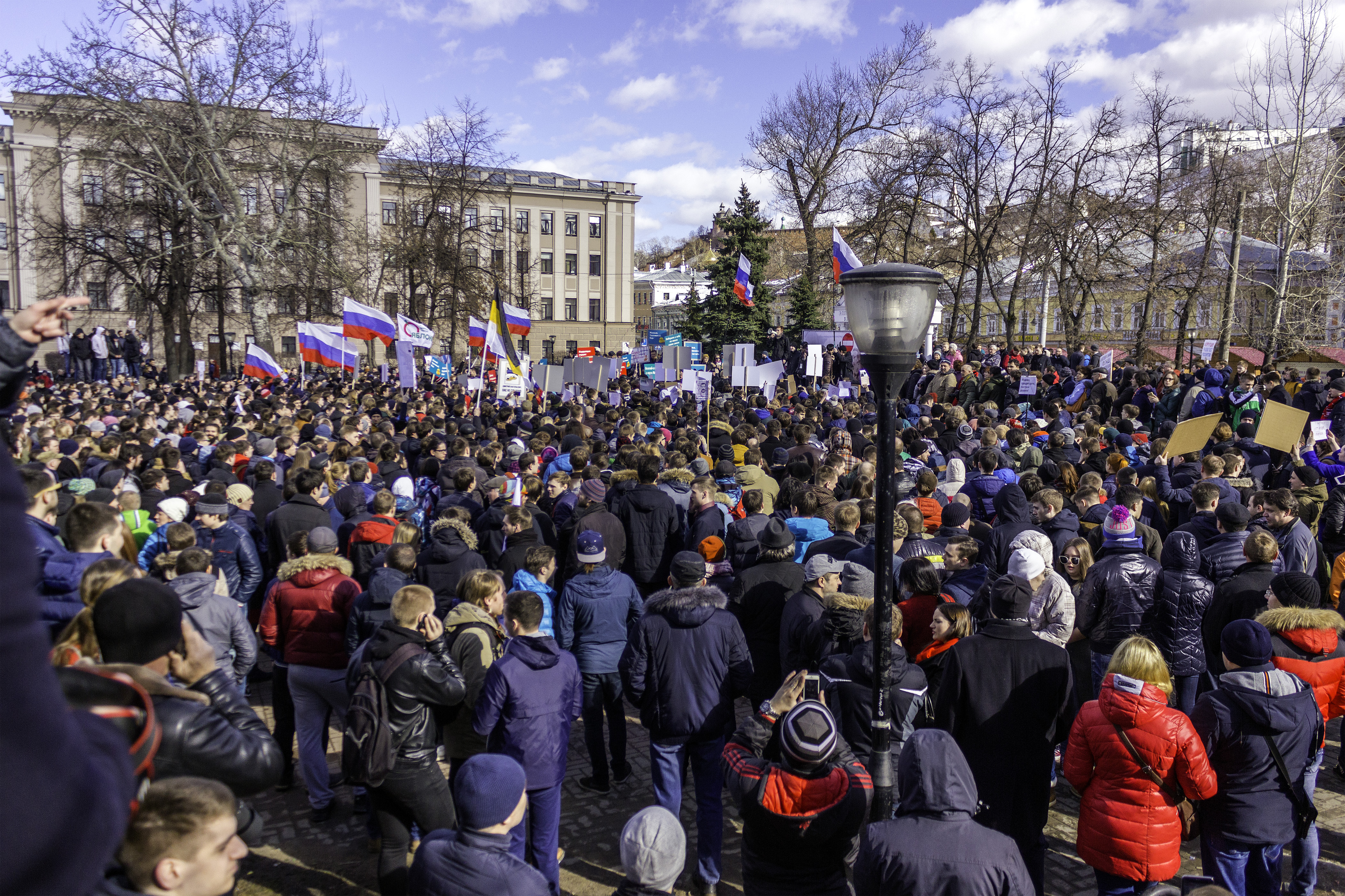
2017–2018 Russian protests

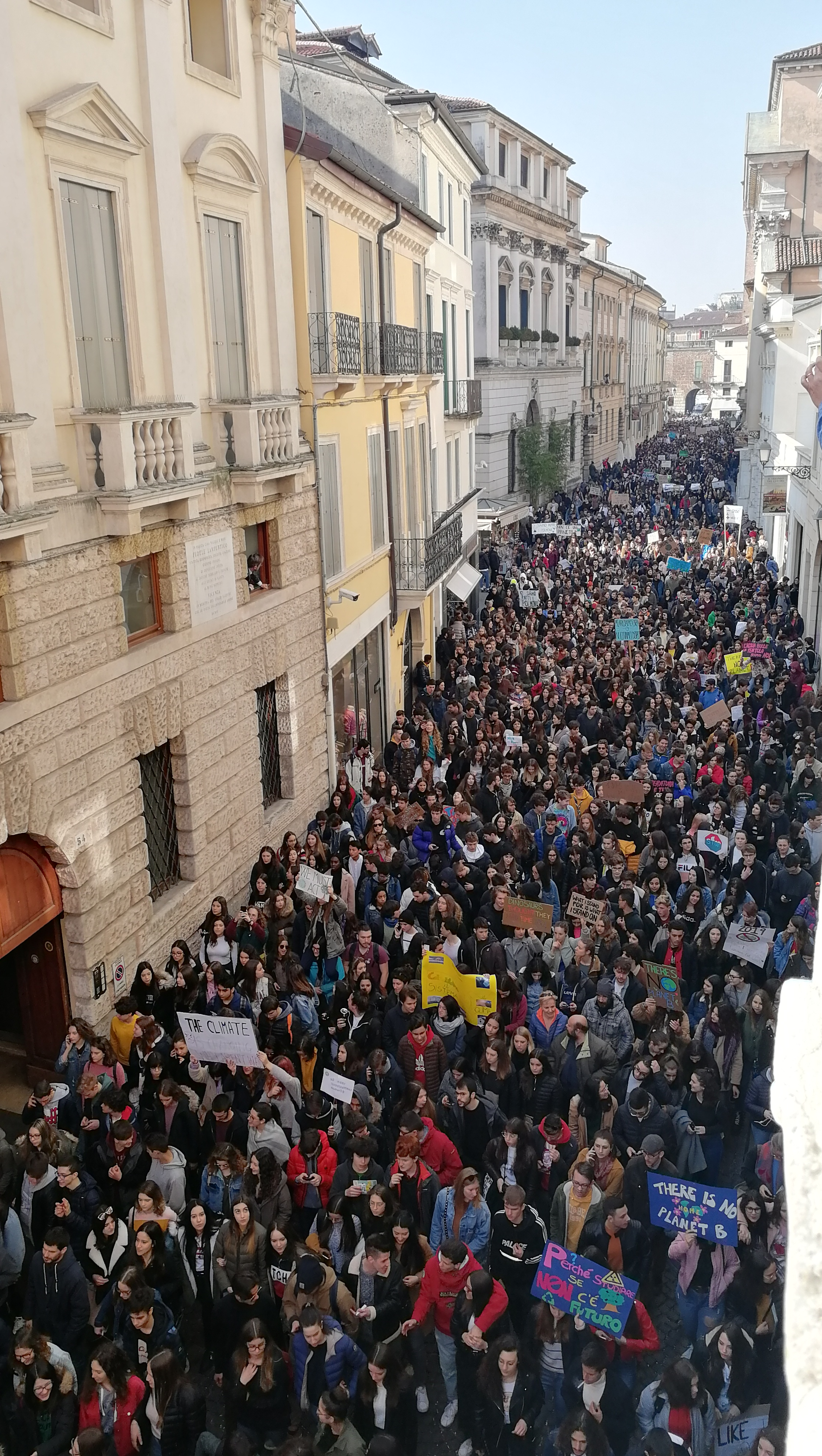
School Strike for Climate in Vicenza, Italy, 15 March 2019.

- Anti-Japanese protests
  - 2005 anti-Japanese demonstrations
  - 2012 China anti-Japanese demonstrations
- Black Lives Matter
  - George Floyd protests
- 2018–2019 Gaza border protests
- 15 October 2011 global protests
- May Day
  - 2009 May Day protests
  - 2012 May Day protests
  - 2013 May Day protests
  - 2014 May Day protests
  - 2015 May Day protests
  - 2017 May Day protests
  - 2025 May Day protests
- Ni una menos
  - NiUnaMenos (Peru)
- Occupy movement
- Protests against Donald Trump
  - 2017 Women's March
  - Protests against Executive Order 13769
  - 2018 Women's March
  - 2019 Women's March
  - 2020 Women's March
  - People's March
- Pro-immigrants protests
  - Baxter protests
  - 2006 United States immigration reform protests
  - Day Without Immigrants 2017
  - Protest "Volem acollir"
  - Protests against the Trump administration family separation policy
  - Citizenship Amendment Act protests
  - 2026 anti-One Nation student protests in Australia
- Anti-immigrants protests
  - Russian marches
  - 2015 Geldermalsen riot
  - 2018 Chemnitz protests
  - 2024 United Kingdom riots
  - 2025–26 March for Australia
- School strike for climate / Fridays for Future (FFF)
- Protests over responses to the COVID-19 pandemic
  - 2020 Brazilian protests
  - 2021 Brazilian protests
  - 2020 Czech anti-lockdown protests
  - Protests over COVID-19 policies in Germany
  - COVID-19 protests in the Netherlands
  - COVID-19 anti-lockdown protests in New Zealand
  - 2020 Serbian protests
  - 2020 United States anti-lockdown protests
  - COVID-19 anti-lockdown protests in the United Kingdom
  - 2022 COVID-19 protests in China
  - Freedom Convoy
  - Strikes during the COVID-19 pandemic
- Gaza war protests
  - Gaza war protests in the United States
  - Gaza war protests in the United Kingdom
  - 2025 Italian general strikes and protests for Gaza
  - Gaza war protests in Israel

=== National ===
Abkhazia

- 2014 Abkhazian Revolution
- 2020 Abkhazian political crisis
- 2021 Abkhazia unrest
- 2024 Abkhazian protests

Afghanistan

- 2012 Afghanistan Quran burning protests
- 2019–2020 Afghanistan protests
- 2021 Afghan protests

Albania

- 2004 Albanian protests
- 2011 Albanian opposition demonstrations
- 2013 Syrian chemical weapons protests in Albania
- 2017 Albanian opposition protests
- 2018–2019 student protests in Albania
- 2019 Albanian opposition protests
- 2020 Albanian protests
- 2022 Albanian protests
- 2025-2026 Albanian opposition protests
- Flamingo Revolution

Algeria

- Black Spring (Algeria)
- 2010–2012 Algerian protests
- 2019–2021 Algerian protests
- 2021 Algerian protests

Argentina

- December 2001 riots in Argentina
- 2008 Argentine agrarian strike
- September 2012 cacerolazo in Argentina
- 8N (2012)
- 18A (2013)
- 2013 police revolts in Argentina
- 13N (Argentina) (2014)
- 18F (demonstration) (2015)
- 2016 Tarifazo in Argentina
- Federal March in Argentina of 2016
- March 2017 Argentine protests
- 21F (Argentina) (2018)
- 17A (2020)
- 2020–2021 Argentinian protests
- 2023 Jujuy protests
- 2024 Argentina protests

Armenia

- 2003–2004 Armenian protests
- 2008 Armenian presidential election protests
- 2011 Armenian protests
- Mashtots Park Movement (2012)
- 2013 Armenian protests
- Electric Yerevan (2015)
- 2018 Armenian revolution
- October 2018 protests in Armenia
- Armenian political crisis (2020–present)
  - 2020–2021 Armenian protests
  - 2022 Armenian protests
  - 2023 Armenian protests
  - 2024 Armenian protests

Azerbaijan

- 2003 Azerbaijani protests
- 2005 Azerbaijani protests
- 2011 Azerbaijani protests
- 2013 Baku protests
- 2016 Azerbaijani protests
- 2019 Baku protests
- July 2020 Azerbaijani protests
- 2026 Azerbaijani protests

Bangladesh

- 2013 Shahbag protests
- 2015 Bangladesh student protests against VAT on education
- 2018 Bangladesh quota reform movement
- 2018 Bangladesh road-safety protests
- 2018–2019 Bangladesh protests and unrest
- 2020 Bangladesh protests
- July Revolution (2024)

Belarus

- Jeans Revolution
- 2010 Belarusian protests
- 2011 Belarusian protests
- Teddybear Airdrop Minsk 2012
- 2017 Belarusian protests
- 2019 Belarusian protests
- 2020–2021 Belarusian protests

Belize

- 2005 Belize unrest

Bolivia

- 2008 unrest in Bolivia
- 2011 Bolivian indigenous rights protests
- 2019 Bolivian protests
- 2020 Bolivian protests
- 2026 Bolivian protests

Bosnia and Herzegovina

- JMBG protests
- 2014 unrest in Bosnia and Herzegovina
- 2018–2019 Bosnian protests

Brazil

- 2013 protests in Brazil
- 2014 protests in Brazil
- 2015–2016 protests in Brazil
- 2017 Brazilian general strike
- 2018 Brazil truck drivers' strike
- 2019 Brazilian general strike
- 2020 Brazilian oil tankers strike
- 2020 Brazilian protests
- 2021 Brazilian protests

Bulgaria

- 2011 Bulgaria antiziganist protests
- 2013 Bulgarian protests against the first Borisov cabinet
- 2013–2014 Bulgarian protests against the Oresharski cabinet
- 2020–2021 Bulgarian protests

Burkina Faso

- 2008 protests in Burkina Faso
- 2011 Burkinabé protests
- 2014 Burkinabé uprising

Burundi

- Burundian unrest (2015–2018)

Cambodia

- 2013–2014 Cambodian protests

Cameroon

- 2008 Cameroonian anti-government protests
- 2016–2017 Cameroonian protests

Canada

- 2010 Canada anti-prorogation protests
- Idle No More (2012)
- 2020 Canadian pipeline and railway protests
- 2022 Canada Convoy protest

Chad

- 2022 Chadian protests

Chile

- 2006 student protests in Chile
- 2008 student protests in Chile
- 2011 Magallanes protests
- 2012 Aysén protests
- 2019–2021 Chilean protests

China

- 2011 Chinese pro-democracy protests
- Wukan protests (2011)
- Jasic Incident (2018)
- 2022 COVID-19 protests in China

Colombia

- 2013 Colombian coffee growers strike
- 2013 Colombian agrarian strike
- 2019–2020 Colombian protests
- Javier Ordóñez protests
- 2021 Colombian protests

Costa Rica

- 2018 Costa Rican protests

Cuba

- 2021 Cuban protests

Czech Republic

- 2017 Czech government crisis
- Milion chvilek pro demokracii (2018–2021)
- Je to na nás!

Djibouti

- 2011 Djiboutian protests

DR Congo

- 19 January 2015 DRC protests
- December 2016 Congolese protests
- Anti-MONUSCO protests
- 2025 Kinshasa riots

Dominican Republic

- 2017–2018 Dominican Republic protests
- 2020 Dominican Republic protests

Ecuador

- 2012 Ecuadorian protests
- 2015 Ecuadorian protests
- 2019 Ecuadorian protests
- 2020 Ecuadorian protests
- 2022 Ecuadorian protests

Egypt

- 2008 Egyptian general strike
- Egyptian revolution of 2011
- 2012–2013 Egyptian protests
- June 2013 Egyptian protests
- Post-coup unrest in Egypt (2013–2014)
- 2019 Egyptian protests
- 2020 Egyptian protests

Estonia

- Bronze Night (2007)
- Enough of False Policy (2012)

Eswatini

- 2021 Eswatini protests

Ethiopia

- 2016 Ethiopian protests
- October 2019 Ethiopian clashes
- Hachalu Hundessa riots

France

- 2005 French riots
- French Student and Workers Strike against Austerity 2009
- 2010 French pension reform strikes
- Republican marches (2015)
- 2015 Corsican protests
- Nuit debout (2016)
- 2017 French riots
- Protests against Emmanuel Macron (2017–2020)
  - Yellow vests movement (2018–2020)
  - 2019–2020 French pension reform strike
- 2021–2022 social unrest in the French West Indies
- 2022 Corsica unrest
- 2023 French pension reform strikes
- 2024 New Caledonia unrest
- 2024 Mayotte crisis

Gabon

- 2016 Gabonese protests

Georgia

- Rose Revolution
- 2007 Georgian demonstrations
- 2009 Georgian demonstrations
- 2011 Georgian protests
- 2012 Georgian protests
- 2019–2020 Georgian protests
- 2023 Georgian protests

Germany

- Refugee protests in Germany (2012–present)
- Ende Gelände
  - Ende Gelände 2015
  - Ende Gelände 2016
  - Ende Gelände 2017
  - Ende Gelände 2018
  - Ende Gelände 2019
  - Ende Gelände 2020

Greece

- 2021 Greek protests
- Tempi protests

Guatemala

- Escobal mine protests
- 2015 Guatemalan protests
- 2020 Guatemalan protests

Guinea

- 2007 Guinean general strike
- 2009 Guinean protests
- 2019–2020 Guinean protests

Haiti

- 2018–2021 Haitian protests

Honduras

- 2017–2018 Honduran protests
- 2019 Honduran protests

Hong Kong

- Hong Kong 1 July marches (2003)
- December 2005 protest for democracy in Hong Kong
- Anti-Hong Kong Express Rail Link movement (2009)
- Hong Kong new year marches (January 2010, January 2013)
- 2010 Hong Kong democracy protests
- 2014 Hong Kong protests
- 2019–2020 Hong Kong protests

Hungary

- 2006 protests in Hungary
- Hungarian protests of 2011
- 2014 Hungarian Internet tax protests
- 2018 protests in Hungary

Iceland

- 2009 Icelandic financial crisis protests
- 2016 Icelandic anti-government protests

India

- 2006 Indian anti-reservation protests
- 2011 Indian anti-corruption movement
- 2012 Nirbhaya protest
- The Goenchi Mati Movement
- 2015 Indian writers' protest
- Jawaharlal Nehru University sedition row (2016)
- Chalo demonstrations (2016)
- 2016 Indian general strike
- 2016–2017 Kashmir unrest
- 2016 Manipur unrest
- BHU women's rights protest
  - 2023 IIT-BHU protests
- 2017 pro-jallikattu protests
- 2017 Tamil Nadu farmers' protest
- 2018 Atrocities Act protests
- 2018 Kathua rape case protests
- 2018 Bhima Koregaon violence
- Sabarimala protests (2018 — 2019)
  - Vanitha Mathil (2019)
- Citizenship Amendment Act protests (2019–2020)
  - No NRC movement
  - 2019 Jamia Millia Islamia attack
  - 2020 Jawaharlal Nehru University attack
  - Shaheen Bagh protests
  - 2020 Kerala human chain
- Amarvati protests
- 2020 Hathras protests
- 2020 Sathankulam Police Brutality protests
- 2020 Kashmiri protests
- 2020 Indian general strike
- 2020–2021 Indian farmers' protest
  - 2021 Republic Day protest
  - 2021 Lakhimpur Kheri violence
- 2022 Vanantra Resort murder case agitations
- 2022 Jahangirpuri violence
- 2023 Agnipath Scheme protests
- Protests over Disqualification of Rahul Gandhi (2023)
- 2023 West Bengal local elections violence
- 2023 Indian wrestlers' protest
- Manipur crisis (2024 — 2025)
- 2024–2025 Indian farmers' protest

Indonesia

- November 2016 Jakarta protests
- December 2016 Jakarta protests
- February 2017 Jakarta protests
- 2019 Indonesian protests and riots
- Indonesia omnibus bill protests
- 2024 Indonesian local election law protests
- 2025 Indonesian protests

Iran

- 2011–2012 Iranian protests
- 2017–2018 Iranian protests
- 2018–2019 Iranian general strikes and protests
  - 2018 Iranian water protests
  - 2019 Iranian fuel protests
- 2019–2020 Iranian protests
- 2022–2023 Iranian protests
- 2025–present Iranian protests

Iraq

- 2011 Iraqi protests
- 2012–2013 Iraqi protests
- 2015–2018 Iraqi protests
- 2019–2021 Iraqi protests

Israel

- 2006 Israeli reserve soldiers' protest
- Cottage cheese boycott (2011)
- 2011 Israeli social justice protests
- July 2019 Ethiopian Jews protest in Israel
- Protests against Benjamin Netanyahu (2020–2021)
- 2023 Israeli judicial reform protests
- 2024 Israeli protests

Italy

- No Berlusconi Day (2009)
- 2012 Sicilian protests
- 2013 Italian social protests
- Sardines movement (2019–2020)

Japan

- 2018–2019 Japanese protests

Jordan

- 2011–2012 Jordanian protests
- 2018 Jordanian protests
- 2022 Jordanian protests

Kazakhstan

- Zhanaozen massacre (2011)
- 2016 Kazakh protests
- 2018–2020 Kazakh protests
- 2022 Kazakh protests

Kenya

- 2007–2008 Kenyan crisis
- 2009 Kenya sex strike
- 2017 Kenyan uprising
- Kenya Finance Bill protests
- 2025 Kenyan protests

Kuwait

- 2011–2012 Kuwaiti protests

Kyrgyzstan

- Tulip Revolution
- 2010 Kyrgyz Revolution
- 2013 Kyrgyz protests
- 2019 Kyrgyz protests
- 2020 Kyrgyz Revolution

Lebanon

- 2006–2008 Lebanese protests
- 2011 Lebanese protests
- 2015–2016 Lebanese protests
- 2019–2021 Lebanese protests

Libya

- First Libyan Civil War#Anti-Gaddafi movement (2011)
- 2020 Libyan protests

Macau

- 2010 Macau transfer of sovereignty anniversary protest

Madagascar

- 2009 Malagasy political crisis
- 2018–2019 Malagasy protests
- 2025 Malagasy protests

Malawi

- 2011 Malawian protests

Malaysia

- 2007 Bersih rally
- 2007 HINDRAF rally
- Bersih 2.0 rally (2011)
- Bersih 3.0 rally (2012)
- People's Uprising rally, 2013
- Tangkap Najib rally (2015)
- Bersih 4 rally (2015)
- Bersih 5 rally (2016)

Maldives

- 2025 Maldivian protests

Mali

- 2020 Malian protests

Malta

- 2019–2020 Maltese protests

Mauritania

- 2011–2012 Mauritanian protests

Mexico

- Mexican Indignados Movement (2011)
- 1DMX (2012)
- 2017 Mexican protests
- 2020 Mexican protests

Moldova

- 2002 Moldovan protests
- April 2009 Moldovan parliamentary election protests
- 2013 Pro Europe demonstration in Moldova
- 2015–2016 protests in Moldova
- 2020 Moldovan protests
- 2022–2023 Moldovan protests

Mongolia

- 2008 riot in Mongolia
- 2022 Mongolian protests
- 2025 Mongolian protests

Montenegro

- 2008 protest against Kosovo declaration of independence
- 2015–2016 Montenegrin crisis
- 2019 Montenegrin anti-corruption protests
- 2019–2020 clerical protests in Montenegro
- 2021 Montenegrin nationality law protests

Morocco

- 2011–2012 Moroccan protests
- Hirak Rif Movement
- 2025 Moroccan Gen Z protests

Mozambique

- 2010 Mozambican uprising

Myanmar

- Saffron Revolution (2007–2008)
- 2021 Myanmar protests

Nepal

- 2006 democracy movement in Nepal
- Protest against Guthi Bill (2019)

Netherlands

- Dutch farmers' protests

New Zealand

- 2022 Wellington protests

Nicaragua

- Protests against Daniel Ortega

Nigeria

- 2018–2019 Nigerian protests
- End SARS
- June 12 Nigerian protest (2021)

North Macedonia

- 2011 Macedonian protests
- 2015 Macedonian protests
- 2016 Macedonian protests
- 2022 North Macedonia protests

Pakistan

- Lawyers' Movement (2007)
- Long March (2013)
- 2014 Azadi March
- Inqilab March (2014)
- 2017 Faizabad sit-in
- 2019 Azadi March
- 2021 Pakistani protests
- 2024 Azad Kashmir protests
- 2025 Azad Kashmir protests
- 2026 Azad Kashmir protests

Papua New Guinea

- 2024 Papua New Guinean unrest

Paraguay

- 2017 Paraguayan crisis
- 2021 Paraguayan protests
- 2025 Paraguayan protests

Peru

- Moqueguazo (2008)
- 2009 Peruvian political crisis
- 2010 Peruvian coca growers strike
- 2017–present Peruvian political crisis
  - 2017 education workers' strikes in Peru
  - 2018 Peruvian agrarian strike
  - 2020 Peruvian protests
  - 2020–2021 Peruvian agrarian strike
  - 2022–2023 Peruvian protests
  - 2025 Peruvian protests

Philippines

- Second EDSA Revolution
- Million People March (2013)
- Burial of Ferdinand Marcos (2016)
- Protests against Rodrigo Duterte (2016–2021)
- Protests against Bongbong Marcos
- 2025 Philippine anti-corruption protests

Poland

- December 2016 Polish protests
- Protests against Polish judiciary reforms (2017)
- 2018 Polish protests
- Rainbow Night (2020)

Puerto Rico

- 2010–2011 University of Puerto Rico strikes
- 2013 Puerto Rico teachers protest
- Telegramgate (2019)

Romania

- 2012–2015 unrest in Romania
  - 2012 Romanian protests
  - 2012–2014 Romanian protests against shale gas
  - 2013 Romanian protests against the Roșia Montană Project
  - 2015 Romanian protests
- 2017–2019 Romanian protests
- 2023 Romanian teachers' strike

Russia

- 2004–2005 Russian benefits monetization protests
- Dissenters' March (2005–2008)
- Strategy-31 (2009)
- 2009–2010 Kaliningrad protests
- 2011–2013 Russian protests
- 2014 anti-war protests in Russia
- 2017–2018 Russian protests
- 2018 Russian pension protests
- 2018–2019 Ingushetia protests
- 2019 Moscow protests
- 2020–2021 Khabarovsk protests
- 2021 Russian protests
- 2021 Russian election protests

Saudi Arabia

- 2011–2012 Saudi Arabian protests

Senegal

- 2011–2012 Senegalese protests
- 2021 Senegalese protests
- 2023 Senegalese protests

Serbia

- 2008 protests against Kosovo declaration of independence
- 2016 Serbian protests
- 2017 Serbian protests
- 2018–2020 Serbian protests
- 2020–2022 Serbian protests
- 2021–2022 Serbian environmental protests
- 2024–present Serbian anti-corruption protests

Slovakia

- Protests after murder of Ján Kuciak (2018)
- 2024–2026 Slovak protests

Slovenia

- 2012–2013 Slovenian protests
- 2020 Slovenian protests

South Africa

- Western Cape 2012 Farm Workers' strike
- FeesMustFall (2015–2016)
- 2019 service delivery protests
- 2021 South African unrest
- 2023 South African National Shutdown
- 2026 anti-immigrant movement in South Africa

South Korea

- 2008 US beef protest in South Korea
- 2016–2017 South Korean protests
- Taegukgi rallies (2016–2018)
- 2018–2019 South Korean protests

Spain

- 2010 Spanish general strike
- Anti-austerity movement in Spain
- 2017–2018 Spanish constitutional crisis
- 2023–2024 Spanish protests
- 2024–2025 Spanish anti-tourism protests
- 2026 Spanish housing protests
- 2026 Spanish train drivers protests

Sri Lanka

- 2011 Sri Lanka worker protests
- 2022 Sri Lankan protests

Sudan

- 2011–2013 protests in Sudan
- Sudanese Revolution
- 2019–2022 Sudanese protests

Syria

- Civil uprising phase of the Syrian civil war
- Syrian protests (2016)
- 2020 Suweida protests
- Southern Syria protests (2023–present)

Taiwan

- Million Voices Against Corruption, President Chen Must Go (2006)
- 1025 rally to safeguard Taiwan (2008)
- 517 Protest (2009)
- Sunflower Student Movement (2014)

Thailand

- 2005–2006 Thai political crisis
- 2008 Thai political crisis
- 2009 Thai political unrest
- 2010 Thai political protests
- 2013–2014 Thai political crisis
- 2020–2021 Thai protests

Togo

- 2010–2011 Togolese protests
- 2005 Togo protests and riots
- 2017–2018 Togolese protests

Tunisia

- Tunisian Revolution
- 2013–2014 Tunisian political crisis
- 2016 Tunisian protests
- 2021 Tunisian protests

Turkey

- Republic protests (2007)
- Gezi Park protests (2013)
- 2017 March for Justice
- 2025 Turkish protests

Ukraine

- Ukraine without Kuchma (2000–2001)
- Orange Revolution
- Rise up, Ukraine! (2013)
- 2014 Ukrainian Revolution
- No to capitulation! (2019–2020)

United Kingdom

- 2011 London anti-cuts protest
- 2011 England riots
- Belfast City Hall flag protests (2012)
- Balcombe drilling protest (2013)
- 2016–2019 United Kingdom rail strikes
- Kenmure Street protests (2021)
- Camp Beagle protest (2021–present)
- Vandalism of Stonehenge
- Gaza war protests in the United Kingdom (2023–2025)
- 2024 United Kingdom riots

United States

- 2015 Armenian March for Justice
- 2011 United States public employee protests
- Tea Party protests (2009)
- Occupy Wall Street (2011)
- 2011 Wisconsin protests
- Protests against Donald Trump (2015–2020)
- 2018 United States gun violence protests
- 2018–2019 education workers' strikes in the United States
- Indigenous Peoples March (2019)
- George Floyd protests in Minneapolis–Saint Paul (2020)
- Breonna Taylor protests
- 2020–2021 United States election protests
- 2021 storming of the United States Capitol
- Gaza war protests in the United States (2023–2025)
- Hands Off protests (2025–present)
- No Kings protests (2025–present)

Uzbekistan

- 2005 Andijan unrest
- 2019–2020 Uzbekistan protests

Venezuela

- Venezuelan general strike of 2002–2003
- 2007 RCTV protests
- 2013 Venezuelan presidential election protests
- Venezuelan protests (2014–present)
  - 2014 Venezuelan protests
  - 2017 Venezuelan protests
  - 2019 Venezuelan protests
- Mother of All Marches (2017)
- Venezuelan presidential crisis

Vietnam

- 2014 Vietnam anti-China protests
- 2017 Hanoi hostage crisis
- 2018 Vietnam protests

Yemen

- Yemeni Revolution

Zimbabwe

- 2016–2017 Zimbabwe protests
- 2018 Zimbabwean uprising
- Zimbabwe fuel protests (2019)

== See also ==
- Gen Z protests
- Gen Z protests in Asia
- 2020s in political history
- List of strikes
