= 2012 Sicilian protests =

2012 Sicilian Crisis
- "Operazione Vespri Siciliani"; Part of European debt crisis
- Date: January 16, 2012-January 21, 2012
- Location: Sicily, Italy
- Methods: Protests, Blockade
- Result: Much damage to the Sicilian, Italian and Maltese economy

Parties
Italy	Comitato Forza d'urto Movimento dei Forconi; AIAS

Casualties
- Deaths: 1 victim
- Injuries: Two confirmed injuries (There were probably more)

The 2012 Sicilian protests, also code-named by its organizers as Operation Sicilian Vespers (in Italian: Operazione Vespri siciliani), was a 5-day blockade of roads and seaports that brought Sicily and its economy to a standstill in January 2012. Similar protests affecting wider areas of Italy broke out in December 2013.

The code name of the blockade refers to the Sicilian Vespers, the successful 13th-century rebellion against Angevin rule.

== Organizers ==
Shock Force (in Italian: Comitato Forza d'Urto) is a Sicilian political grouping, which organized Operation Sicilian Vespers, the 5-day blockade of roads and seaports that brought Sicily and its economy to a standstill in January 2012.

Under the Shock Force umbrella other organizations are also represented, such as the Pitchforks Movement (in Italian: Movimento dei Forconi), an informal grouping of farmers, shepherds and breeders, as well as the Sicilian Trucking Association (in Italian: Associazione Imprese Autotrasportatori Siciliani, AIAS), an association representing truck drivers and small logistics business interests. The founder of the Pitchforks Movement was Martino Morsello, a 57 year-old former Socialist councillor of Marsala.

From the very first day, the blockade was strengthened and widely supported by workers and small businesses in other sectors, such as the fishing industry, the building industry and also by Sicilian students.

The Pitchforks Movement presents itself as "non-political" and "against party politics." Unusually, the protest was joined by members of both far-right and far-left political organisations.

== Goals ==
The organizers of the 2012 Sicilian protests framed their demands around several economic and political grievances. At the heart of the protest was the sharp increase in fuel costs: Sicilian protesters, particularly truckers, farmers, fishermen, and small-business owners, complained that excise taxes and market imbalances made petrol prohibitively expensive.

Closely related to this was austerity measures imposed by the Italian government under Prime Minister Mario Monti. Protesters accused national political elites of mismanaging the economy, failing to support productive sectors, and leaving ordinary Sicilians to shoulder the burden of the debt crisis.

Politically, the organizers also called for accountability and renewal of the Sicilian political class. Some leaders explicitly demanded the resignation of the regional government, including then-President Raffaele Lombardo, whom they blamed for failing to defend Sicilians’ interests.

== Blockade events ==
The blockade started on 16 January, when roads, motorways and the gates of the major ports all around Sicily were blocked. A strategic target for the protesters were Sicilian refineries, which are responsible for 42% of Italian fuel production. A fuel shortage on the island soon followed.

On 16 January 2012, the Pitchforks Movement joined Operation Sicilian Vespers, which, while blockading most of the main roads and seaports of the island, led to the suspension of most economic activities in Sicily.

There are reports of the blockade gaining a foothold in mainland Italy, in Calabria and even as far north as Pescara. The blockade is having a negative impact also for the economy of the neighboring Malta.

The other main association involved in the blockade, the Sicilian Trucking Association (in Italian Associazione Imprese Autotrasportatori Siciliani, AIAS) must suspend the blockade after the fifth day, January 21, as per the Italian law, but the Pitchforks Movement, as other members of the Shock Force, may decide to continue indefinitely.

== Accidents ==
- On January 17, in Lentini a protester was slightly injured in the face by a small truck driver who was not joining the blockade.
- On January 19, near Catenanuova, one protester was left with his foot stuck under the wheel of a truck that had tried to break the blockade.
- On January 24, near Asti, during the blockade of the Pitchfork movement, a truck driver hit a protester participating in the blockade, killing him instantly.

== See also ==
- 2013 Italian social protests
- List of protests in the 21st century
