= 2013 May Day protests =

International economic protests

The 2013 May Day protests were a series of international protests involving hundreds of thousands of people that took place worldwide on May Day (1 May 2013) over the ongoing global economic crisis including austerity measures and poor working conditions.

2013 May Day protests report by Voice of America.

== Asia ==
=== Bangladesh ===
Thousands of garment factory workers protested poor working conditions following the 2013 Savar building collapse.

=== Cambodia ===
Five thousand garment workers marched in Phnom Penh demanding better working conditions and wage increases.

=== Indonesia ===
Over 120,000 people from Jakarta and the surrounding cities of Depok, Bogor, Tangerang and Bekasi gathered at Hotel Indonesia and marched to Merdeka Palace, disrupting business activity in Jakarta.

=== Philippines ===
Eight thousand people marched at Manila.

=== Singapore ===
Six thousand rallied at Hong Lim Park to protest immigration policy and high living costs.

=== Turkey ===
Police clashed with protesters in Istanbul trying to reach Taksim Square. Twenty people were arrested.

== Europe ==
=== UK ===
Comparatively muted protest in central London compared to the violence of previous years. It received very little mainstream news coverage.

=== Greece ===
Protesters marched in Athens and Thessaloniki. The communist party-affiliated PAME organised a large strike demonstration in Syntagma Square, while GSEE union and the public sector union ADEDY had their rally at Kafthmonos Square. The Athens May Day demonstration was saluted by Bangladeshi workers' representative as well as by Gilda Chacov Bravo, Cuban member of the Secretariat of the World Federation of Trade Unions (WFTU).

=== Spain ===
Protesters marched in Madrid and Barcelona. In Barcelona, protesters clashed with police, while activists smashed dozens of bank and shop windows and destroyed bus stops, telephone boxes and trash bins.

== North America ==
=== United States ===
Protests were held in Seattle, Los Angeles, Manhattan and Chicago.

- Seattle: A violent protest led to the arrest of 17 people.
- Chicago: A protest left from NBC media headquarters with about 200 people. An anarchist Black Bloc took to the streets in Chicago's Michigan Avenue shopping district, starting confrontations with police and one protester was arrested. A small skirmish broke out in front of a Louis Vuitton store between an owner and protester before meeting up with a larger Immigrant Rights and Union march of over 3,000 people.

== See also ==
- List of protests in the 21st century
