= 2018–2019 Japanese protests =

Peaceful, anti-government protests

The 2018–2019 Japanese protests were a series of peaceful demonstrations and anti-government protests nationwide between May 2018 and June 2019 against the government of Shinzo Abe. The protests would be the most massive and biggest countryside and countrywide uprisings in Japan. The first protests in Japan was against the government of Shinzo Abe and the economic grievances of poorer areas in Japan. Thousands were taking part in the mass protests in May-July 2018 and the anti-rape national protest movement in October 2018-July 2019.

== See also ==
- 2018–2019 South Korean protests
