= 2018 UNAM protests =

Student protests in Mexico

The 2018 UNAM student movement began on August 27, 2018 with the protests of the Azcapotzalco College of Sciences and Humanities in Mexico (CCH Azcapotzalco), where they demanded solutions to the problems of both their campus and the CCH in general. On August 31, the principal of the campus resigned from her position due to the repression of the demands, but when not all were met, the students took over the facilities.

On September 3, the CCH Azcapotzalco, the CCH Oriente and the CCH Naucalpan carried out a mobilisation in Ciudad Universitaria to deliver a petition to the authorities, where they were later attacked and dispersed by a group of 40 people with knives, which resulted in at least 14 injuries. After the acts, at least 40 UNAM campuses in Mexico went on strike for 48 to 72 hours in protest. Protesters rallied in support of the students in the campus in other areas nationwide, mainly Mexico City.

On September 5, a rally was organized in the rectory of UNAM for the events that occurred on September 3, where both institutions and organizations of the UNAM and others attended in the form of support. On 7 September Andrés Manuel López Obrador, president-elect of Mexico, met with the rector of UNAM Enrique Graue, to discuss the problems of the institutions and possible solutions.

On September 13, a march was called to commemorate the March of Silence that took place in 1968. On October 2, a march commemorating the Tlatelolco Massacre was held, which culminated in the Plaza de las Tres Culturas.

== See also ==
- 2020 Mexican protests
