= 2016 Tunisian protests =

- Date: 15–22 January 2016
- Location: Kasserine, Tunis, Sidi Bouzid, and Gafsa
- Caused by: High unemployment rates
- Methods: Protests; Demonstrations
- Result: Curfew

Parties
Tunisian youth	Tunisia; Tunisian police

Lead figures
Chedli Boualeg	Youssef Chahed (Prime Minister); Beji Caid Essebsi (President)

Number
100+	100+

Casualties and losses
40 injured	59 injured

In January 2016, protests erupted in the Kasserine region of Tunisia over unemployment. These unemployment rates were 30% in the region as compared to the national 15.3%. In particular, there was high youth unemployment. The protests consisted of violence against the police and marching on Tunis. The incidents continued for a week injuring 59 officers and 40 protestors until the government imposed a curfew.

== See also ==
- 2021 Tunisian protests
