= 2022 Albanian protests =

- Date: 2022
- Location: Albania
- Caused by: Inflation
- Methods: Protests

In 2022, protests were held in Albania. Anti-government protests were held by Albanians inside and outside the country.

== Background ==
The spark for the protests was rising prices, particularly fuel prices, which rose by more than 40% in a single week in Albania due to the war in Ukraine. The price of diesel fuel rose from 180 leks (€1.50) before the Russian invasion of Ukraine to 290 leks (€2.37) in July of the same year. Another issue cited by protesters was the mass emigration of people from the country.

== Events ==
In March 2022, the Albanian government imposed price controls in response to protests. In July 2022, peaceful protests were held in Tirana, Albania, against corruption and the cost of living crisis. It was organised by the Democratic Party and was attended by its leader former Prime Minister Sali Berisha. The protestors demanded the resignation of Prime Minister Edi Rama and his government. Price hikes reportedly made food and energy costs rise. In November 2022, tens of thousands gathered in Tirana. Albanians gathered in London against comments made by UK Home Secretary Suella Braverman. On 6 December 2022, the opposition leader Sali Berisha was punched in the face.

== Consequences ==
Lawyers accused the police of using undue violence against protesters including holding a disabled person in a cell for four days. Prime Minister Edi Rama remained in office.
