= 2019 student protests in Costa Rica =

The 2019 Costa Rican student protests were a series of protests by Costa Rican high school and university students during 2019, for different reasons.

== Student movement ==
The protests were led mainly by the Movement of Secondary Students, or MEDSE, which originated as a group and page on the social network Facebook and ended up closing dozens of schools and public roads. Although the number of It is uncertain because different amounts have been reported (between 305 of more than 1000 according to MEDSE and 86 initially according to the MEP), the protests did lead to the departure of Education Minister Edgar Mora Altamirano from Carlos Alvarado Quesada's cabinet. The demands of the students were mainly:

- End of the Learning Strengthening Tests for the Renewal of Opportunities (FARO) that replaced the high school memory exams.
- End of the dual education project that was being discussed in the Legislative Assembly of Costa Rica to authorize students to work as apprentices in private companies. This project was also opposed by the country's unions and it was approved by the legislative plenary in August.
- Infrastructure improvements.

Exit of Edgar Mora. They also criticized the purchase of drones for an agricultural school in San Carlos and the transfer of 15,000 million colones to public universities. The students had the support of the unionist Albino Vargas, general secretary of the National Association of Public Employees and other unions.

== The MEDSE Group ==
The MEDSE group is not an official legal association or part of a legal student government. In an interview conducted by Randall Rivera, director of the radio program Matices de Radio Monumental, with a MEDSE spokesperson; Carlos Ramírez accompanied by Leonardo Calderón who was not part of the group but planned to help them mediate the entire process, and by phone with the President of the Kenneth Sánchez group, Rivera discovered that the movement is based on social networks, based on the number of likes on his Facebook page to determine the number of members and that the board of directors was elected among the administrators of the page. He also found contradictions in what was expressed by the attendees who stated that they supported Mora's administration, the FARO tests, and dual education, and confirmed Vargas's support. Kenneth Sánchez later affirmed that Rivera's interview was "a setup." and that he never gave it, however alternative sources such as Double Check did not find evidence of montage by Monumental, the newspaper La Nación confirmed that the number dialed by Monumental belonged to Sanchez and those attending the program also confirmed that they were sent by Sánchez.

== Dual Education ==
The dual education project that is discussed in the Legislative Assembly in the Commission of Science and Technology would seek to implement that students from technical colleges, universities and the National Institute of Learning can apply their knowledge in companies as part of their education. Participation would be voluntary. The project has the support of the government of Carlos Alvarado and of the National Liberation, Citizen Action and Christian Social Unity banks, and the unanimous support of the commission's deputies. The project, in addition to the MEDSE, is opposed by the unions and left-wing parties that consider that there would be a labor relationship between the parties; the MEDSE movement accuses the project of trying to "enslave" the students. The bill is opposed by deputy José María Villalta, the only left-wing deputy in the country, for which he filed more than one hundred motions that would allow him to extend the discussion of it for months. The bill would be approved almost unanimously by the deputies (with only two votes against) on August 12, 2019.

== Divisions ==
At the end of July there was a division between the MEDSE and National Student Resistance groups over the use of the latter's Facebook page, which, according to its leader, had been "stolen" by Kenneth Sánchez, which he described as a "stab in the back”.

== University students ==
Months later, another series of protests would take place as a result of the opposition to the application of the fiscal rule in the budget of public universities and the request of the Treasury to use ₡ 70,000 million from the Special Fund for Higher Education (an annual percentage that by Constitution is delivery to the universities of the national budget) for infrastructure works. The rectors of the five public universities opposed the measure, arguing that it violated university autonomy and endangered the operational capacity of the universities. The federations of the five universities also opposed. Different blockades were raised, the most notorious being the one that happened on the main street of Heredia in front of the National University and another in San Pedro de Montes de Oca near the University of Costa Rica, as well as the taking of two buildings; the Faculty of Social Sciences of the University of Costa Rica and the Rectory of the National University (being quickly evicted from the latter). There was also a massive peaceful demonstration by the five student federations in front of the Presidential House. After negotiations between the Governing Council and the rectors, an agreement was reached in which the government yielded to most of its claims, for which most of the student body, however, some groups maintained protests and taking of buildings in the UCR and UNA rejecting the agreement. Finance Minister Rocío Aguilar Montoya resigned from her post shortly after the agreement was sealed.

== See also ==
- 2019 Bolivian protests
- 2019 Venezuelan protests
