= 2020 Kashmiri protests =

Violent demonstrations and general strikes in Kashmir

- Date: April 1, 2020 – December 31, 2020
- Location: Kashmir
- Caused by: Killings and abuses of Kashmiris; Fighting and Indian Occupation; 2019-2021 Jammu and Kashmir lockdown
- Goals: Resignation of Narendra Modi and Full independence; Fresh general elections; Independence Referendum immediately
- Methods: Demonstrations
- Result: Protests suppressed by force

The 2020 Kashmiri protests was a series of violent demonstrations and massive general strikes between April–December against racism, India and demanded accession and an end to killings and the 2019-2021 Jammu and Kashmir lockdown. Anti-India sentiment has been on the rise since August 2019, when India stripped its national autonomy and sparked widespread protests. The series of widespread violence has cane after a series of killings, violence and gunfights between Kashmiri independence movement militants and the Indian army. Thousands of protesters rallied in Srinigar and other areas demanding democratic reforms and accession to Pakistan. In Soura, a wave of protests sweltered the city as they demanded an end to India occupation. On 17 September, thousands demonstrated calling on an end to the government and Indian occupation after an alleged cover-up death in custody. Battles between protesters and police led to tanks and the military to be sent in after weeks-long strikes in December. Fresh Mass demonstrations were also met with Tear gas, Pellet (air gun) and buckshot. At least 6+ protesters have been killed in the clashes with police.

== See also ==
- 2016-2017 Kashmir unrest
- 2010 Kashmir unrest
