= 2023 West Bengal local elections violence =

2023 violence in India

2023 West Bengal panchayat poll violence
- Date: 8 June 2023 - 13 July 2023
- Location: West Bengal, India; 22°59′12″N 87°51′18″E
- Caused by: Violent clashes between workers of political parties across various parts of the state
- Methods: Arson, Shooting, Rioting

Casualties
- Deaths: 48
- Injuries: 400+
- Location within India

A violent clash erupted between various workers of political parties including TMC, BJP, Congress and CPI (M) during the poll day of panchayat elections on 8 July 2023 in West Bengal. According to reports of Aljazeera and Reuters, at least 11 were killed and dozens more injured in clashes. Partial violence across the state had started from the announcement of the dates of polling from 8 June resulting in few casualties too. With polling and elections going on, violence against many workers continued over the streets of the state. The state witnessed gun shots, assaults, rioting and arsons wide across many parts of the state. Moreover, ballot boxes had been destroyed in various parts of the state. The polling process began at 7 am in 73,887 seats in rural areas of the state, where approximately 56,700,000 people were expected to cast their votes.

== Background ==
Primarily Bhangar in West Bengal saw stones being pelted and kachcha bombs being burst when a sudden violent clash began between workers of Indian Secular Front and Trinamool Congress. This further spread across various parts of the state, where polling for panchayats were being carried on, mainly around the rural parts of the state.

== Casualties ==
The clashes reportedly led to more than 15 deaths with allegations of strong-arm tactics, and several numbers injured, admitted in hospitals. The reports said deaths included around 7 TMC workers, 2 BJP workers, 2 ISF workers and others involved in riots and clashes.

== Reactions ==
The governor of West Bengal C. V. Ananda Bose reacted stating that "We must kill poverty, but poor are being killed" and expressed disappointment in the state's management of polls. He also called these incidents disturbing and said he would be submitting reports to the Union Ministry of Home Affairs.

The Leader of Opposition Suvendhu Adhikari called it as "Death of Democracy" and demanded for a free and fair poll to be rescheduled. Congress Leader Digvijaya Singh said it to be "frightening" and appealed for peace and strict handling of situation to the state government.

== See also ==
- 2021 West Bengal post-poll violence
- 2022 Birbhum violence
- Ram Navami riots
