= Chalo demonstrations =

The chalo (Hindi "let's go") demonstrations were a series of protests against the treatment of Dalits during 2016 in response to cow vigilante violence in India since 2014. Some examples and extra information can be found on the page detailing the Una Flogging Incidents.

Chalo Una ("Let's go to Una") on the fourth of August 2016, was a demonstration of an estimated 10,000 people proposing to march from Ahmedabad to Una, Gujarat over 10 days to protest the flogging of four Dalit men caught skinning a cow.

One month later, on October fourth, the Chalo Udupi rally and march set out from Freedom Park, Bangalore to Udupi in response to the murder of a Dalit, Praveen Poojary, on the assumption that he was transporting cows to a slaughter house. Other demonstrations, such as chalo Trivandrum, followed in October 2016.
