= 2013 Puerto Rico teachers protest =

Teachers on strike and protesting event

The 2013 Puerto Rico teachers protest was a protest staged by the teachers of Puerto Rico's public school system which began on December 19, 2013. The purpose of the protest was to oppose Governor Alejandro García Padilla's proposed reforms to Puerto Rico's pension system, amid pressure from Wall Street rating agencies. On December 15, before the protests began, the Ample Front in Defense of the Teachers' Retirement System (Frente Amplio en Defensa del Sistema de Retiro para Maestros) threatened to carry out strikes, acts of civil disobedience, and hunger strikes if Governor Padilla called an extraordinary session to discuss the reforms. The Puerto Rico Teachers Federation also threatened to strike if a reform was passed which didn't match their standards.

On December 19, Governor Padilla called an extraordinary session to discuss reforms to the teachers' pension system. Teachers from the Puerto Rico Teachers Federation later took over the floor of the Senate of Puerto Rico with the intention of halting this session. The Sergeant-at-Arms of the Senate of Puerto Rico stated he could not guarantee the safety of those in the hemicycle of the Capitol of Puerto Rico that houses the Senate. Both the Governor and the President of the Senate of Puerto Rico, Eduardo Bhatia, asked the Puerto Rico Joint Forces of Rapid Action (FURA) and the Puerto Rico Police to not intervene nor attempt to remove the protesters. Several upper chamber employees were hurt and property was damaged in the protest.
