= 2018–2019 South Korean protests =

Protests against the President

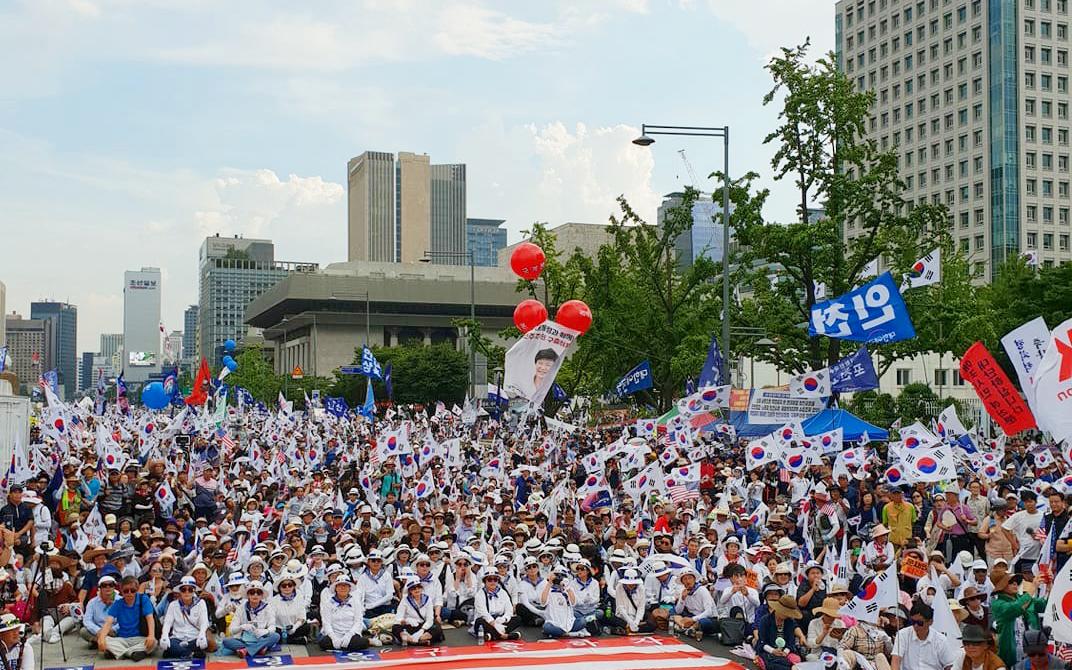
- Protests on 15 August 2018 against president Moon Jae-in in Seoul
- Date: 11 February 2018 – 14 October 2019
- Location: South Korea
- Caused by: Corruption scandals involving Moon Jae-in and Cho Kuk
- Goals: Resignation of Moon Jae-in; Fresh general elections and an end to corruption
- Methods: Political demonstration
- Result: Protests suppressed by force; Resignation of Cho Kuk

The 2018–2019 South Korean protests was a civic resistance movement calling for the resignation of Moon Jae-in, the 12th president of South Korea. It started to take place in earnest by the organizers who led the protest against the impeachment of president Park Geun-hye. A wave of anti-government protests swept South Korea throughout October 2019, when millions of demonstrators marched in Downtown Seoul in street protests and 2-week long movement against the corruption scandals involving president Moon Jae-in and former justice minister Cho-Kuk.

After a long period of unprecedented demonstrations, Cho Kuk resigned and a new justice minister was put into place. Although protests took place in October 2019, commonly known as the South Korean October Revolution, protests against the refugee crisis occurred in June 2018, the large pro-Japan trade and anti-restrictions street protests between May–August 2019, anti-North Korea riots in February 2018. 1 was suspected killed in clashes in February 2018 but it has not been confirmed.

== See also ==
- 2016-2017 South Korean protests
