= 2020 Mexican protests =

Protests against anti-women violence

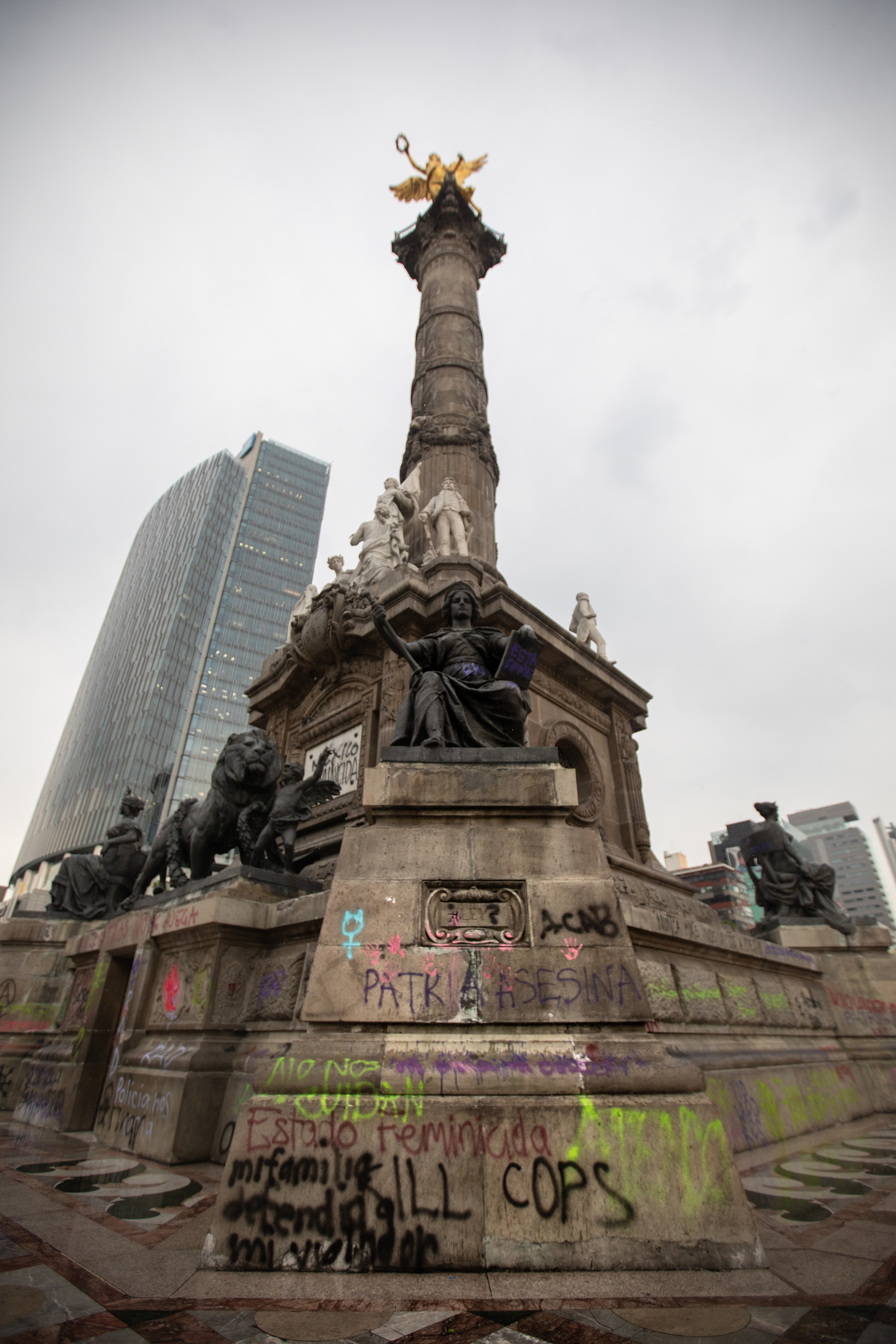
The Angel of Independence monument after the 16 August demonstrations

The 2020 Mexican protests were massive demonstrations and increasingly violent clashes against violence against women and demanded the country to end femicides and attacks against women. Suicides and homicides also triggered mass protests by women and activists nationwide, but the epicentre of protests and riots was in Mexico City. Mexicans have been on the streets since 9 March, when a nationwide strike by hundreds of thousands of Women went ahead. Anti-govt mass protests also took place on 10 March nationwide. On 21 October, a mass protest by tens of thousands of demonstrators was held against restrictions and the government. On 10 November, police opened fire on demonstrators as street protests was held for 1 day. Outrage erupted in Mexico after shots were fired in squares in Mexico City by police forces. Police brutality sparked outrage as well for a couple of days online in Mexico. Protesters also rallied peacefully on the last rally on 10 December against violence against women.

== See also ==
- 2017 Mexican protests
- Feminism in Mexico
