= 2021 Colombian protests =

2021 protests in Colombia against tax increases

- Part of protests over responses to the COVID-19 pandemic
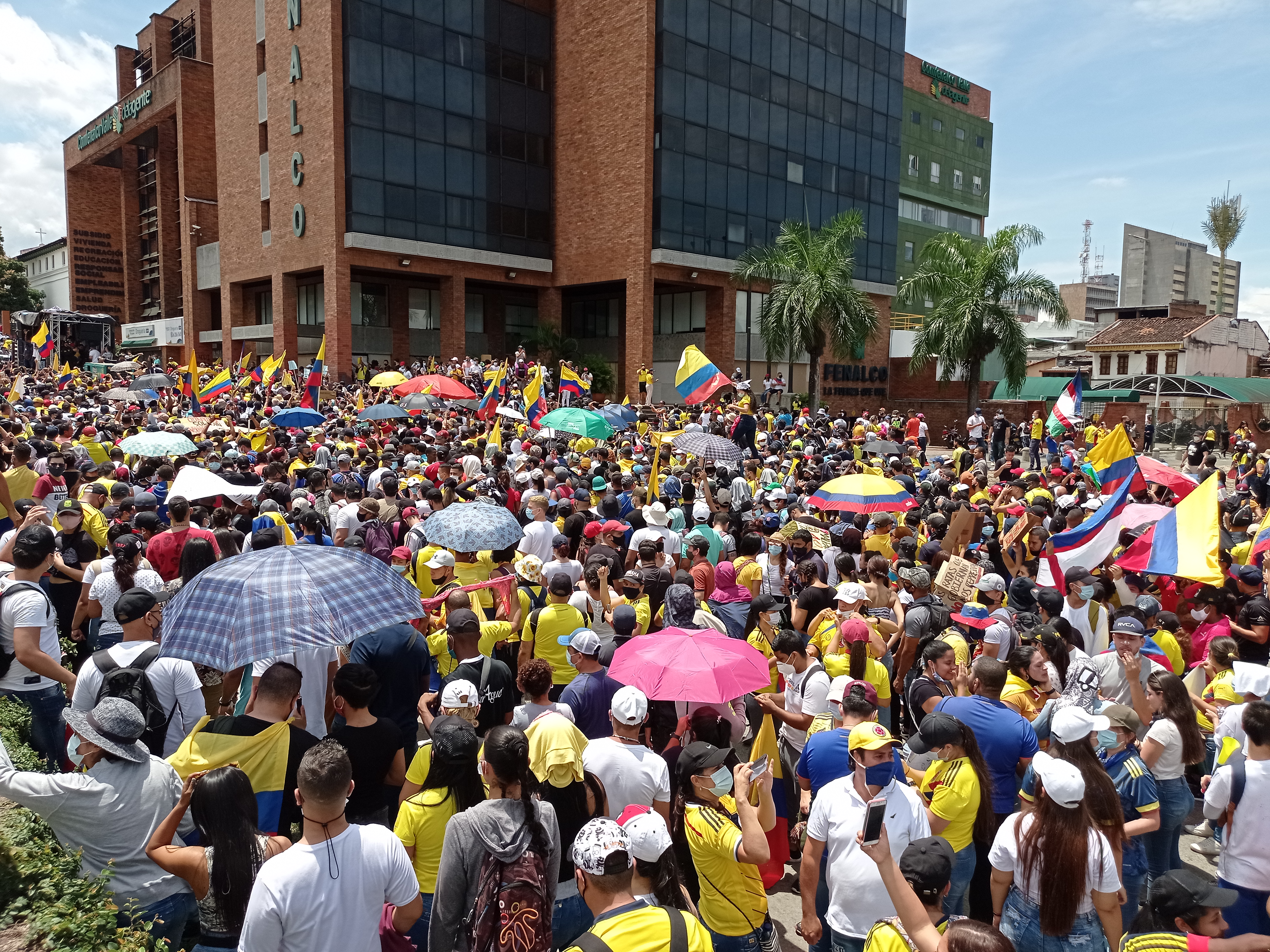
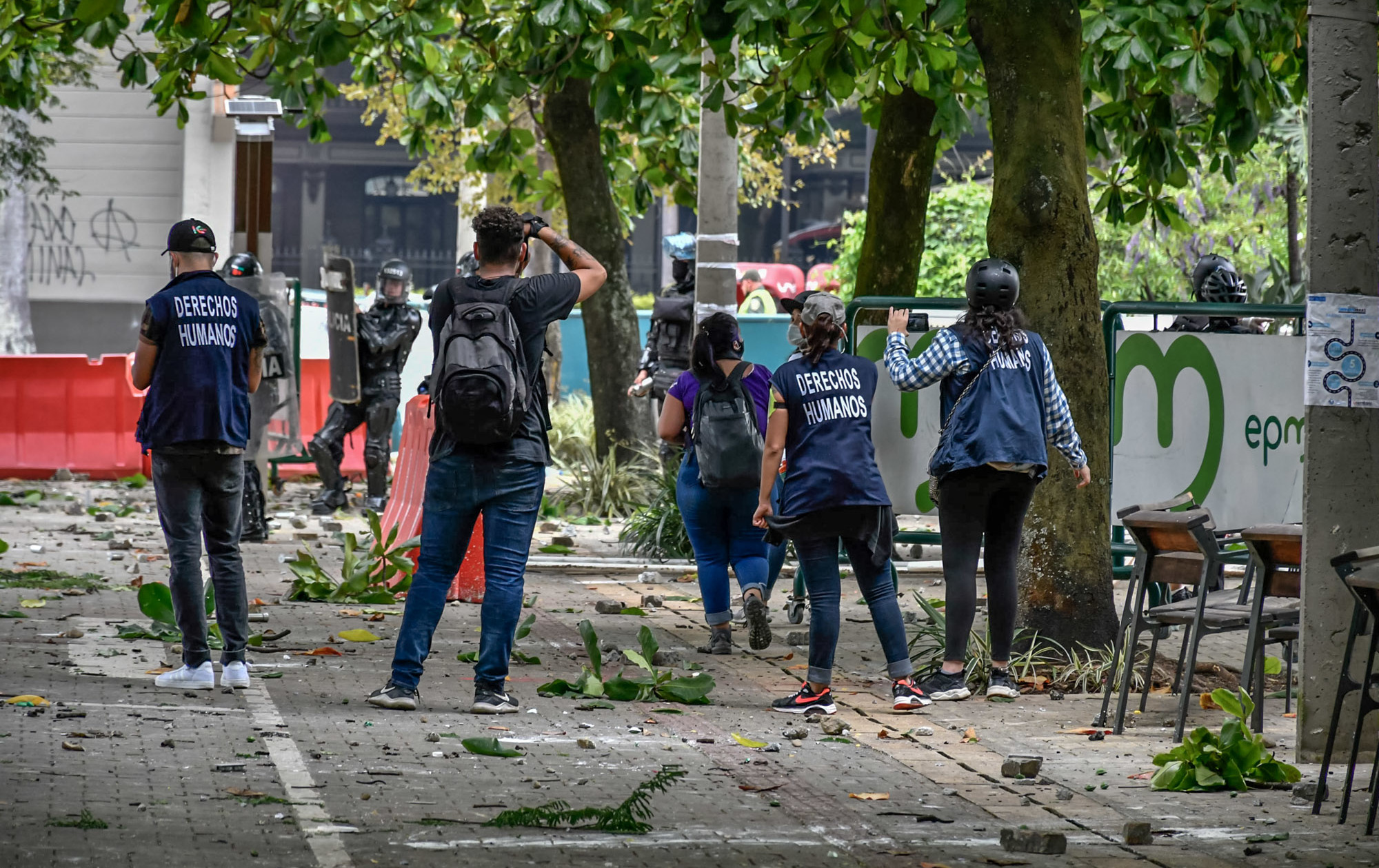
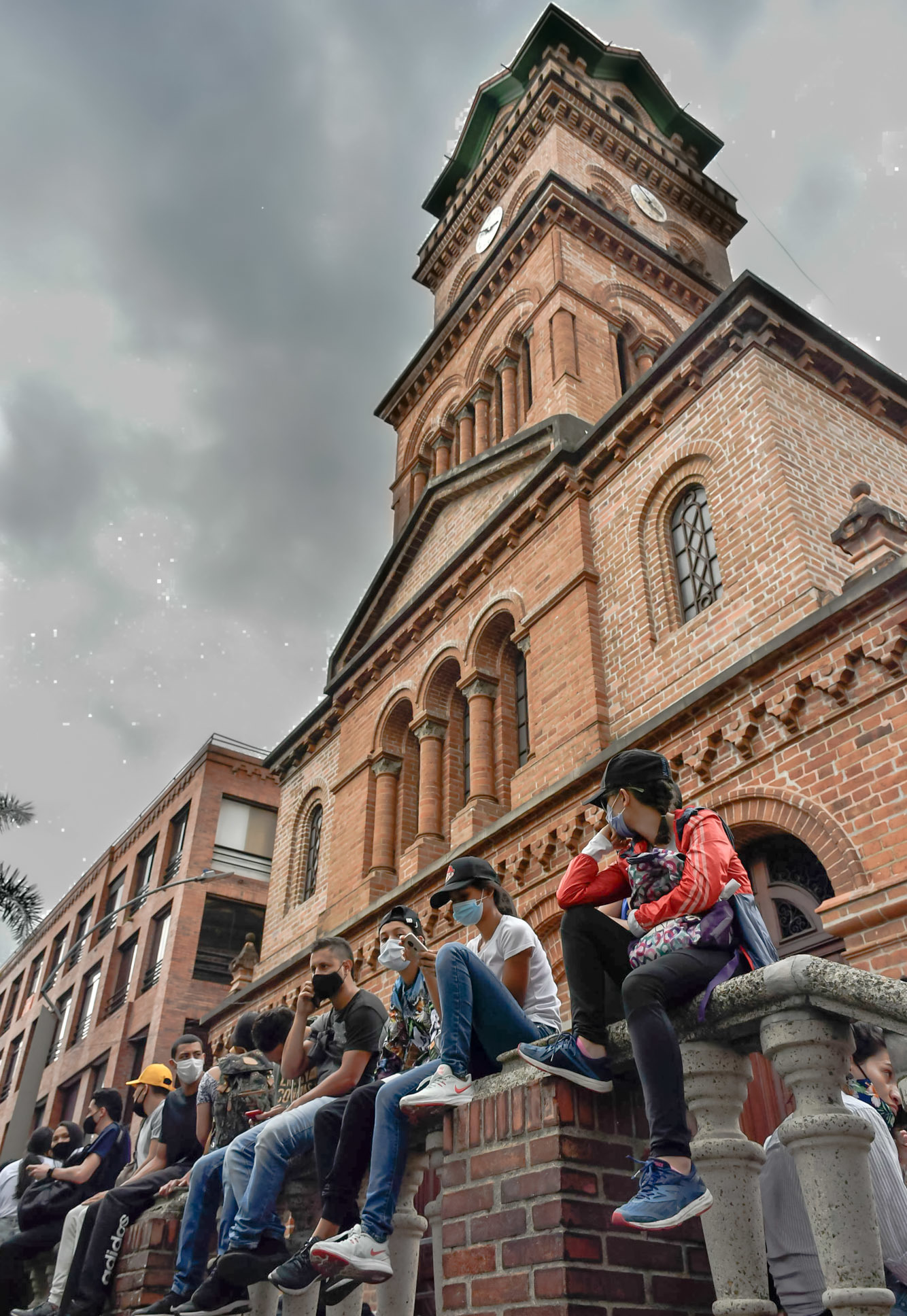
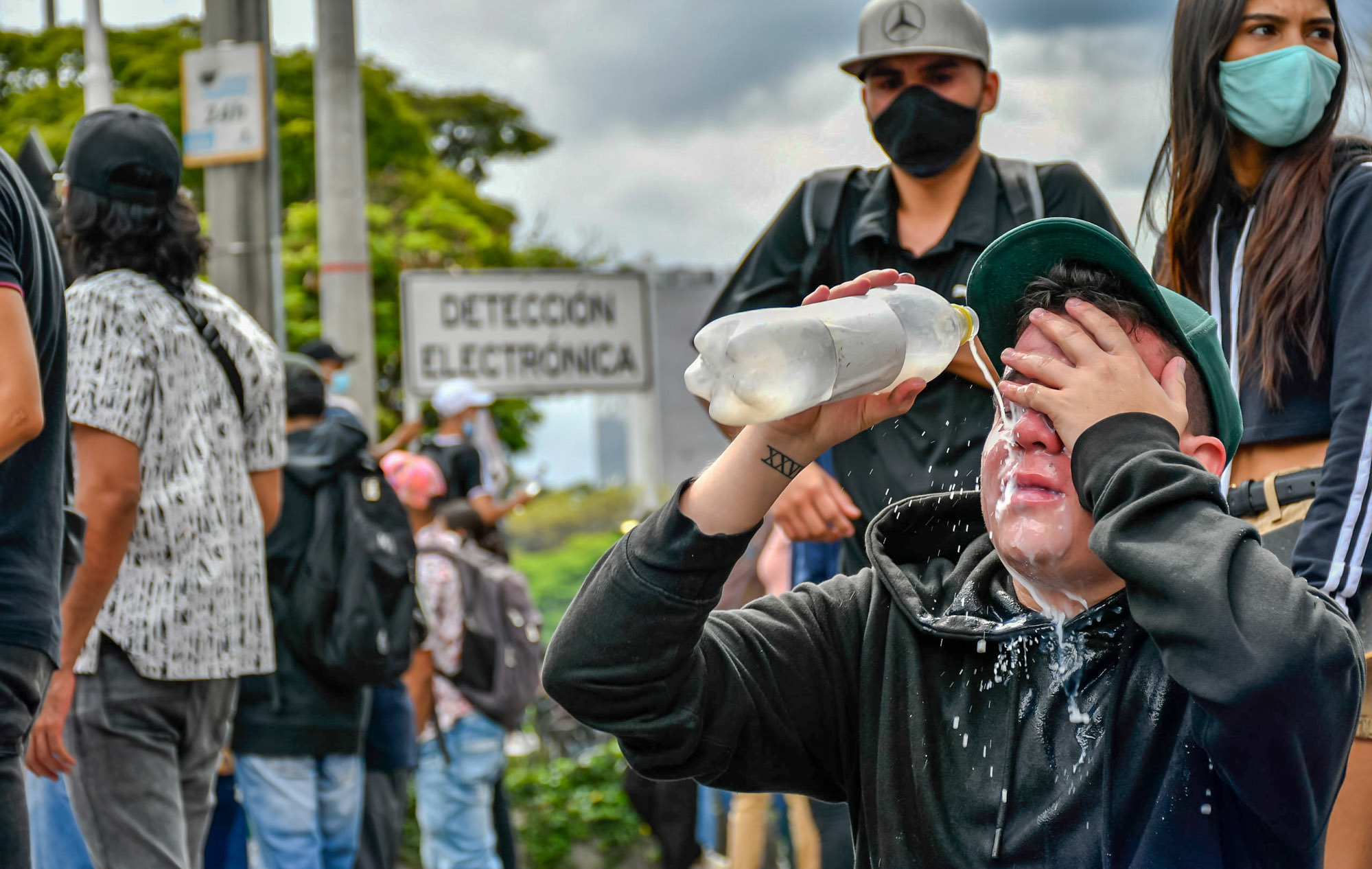
- Top to bottom, clockwise: Protesters in Cali on 1 May 2021, a group of protesters sitting at the entrance of St. Joseph Church in El Poblado, a protester washing tear gas from his eyes, human rights defenders observing the response of authorities
- Date: 28 April 2021 – 31 December 2021 (5 years, 6 months and 6 days)
- Location: Colombia
- Caused by: Government's health and tax reform proposals and handling of the COVID-19 pandemic; Corruption, police brutality, and violence
- Goals: Withdrawal of health and tax reforms; Resignation of President Iván Duque, Minister of Finance Alberto Carrasquilla, Minister of Defense Diego Molano Aponte, General Eduardo Zapateiro (commander of the National Army), and General Jorge Luis Vargas (director of the National Police); Trial of former President Álvaro Uribe Vélez for crimes against humanity, among others; Reform of the National Police and dismantling of the Mobile Anti-Disturbance Squadron (ESMAD); Compliance of the Colombian peace process with the FARC and the agreements ensuing the 2019–2020 Colombian protests
- Methods: Labor strike, protests, demonstrations, civil disobedience, civil resistance, online activism, and riots
- Result: Withdrawal of the health and tax reform proposals; Resignation of the Minister of Foreign Affairs Claudia Blum, Minister of Finance Alberto Carrasquilla and his entire economic team; Announcement of free tuition for strata 1, 2, and 3 for the 2021–2022 semester in public universities; Withdrawal of Colombia's co-hosting rights for the 2021 Copa América; Alleged police brutality, sexual violence, and missing people

Parties
Protesters: Comité Nacional de Paro; Central Union of Workers (CUT); Central General de Trabajadores (CGT); Central de Trabajadores de Colombia (CTC); Federación Colombiana de Trabajadores de la Educación (Fecode); Dignidad Agropecuaria; Cruzada Camionera; Civilians	Government of Colombia: Military Forces of Colombia; National Army of Colombia; National Police of Colombia; Mobile Anti-Disturbance Squadron

Lead figures
Social leaders and government opposition	President Iván Duque; Vice President Marta Lucía Ramírez; Minister of National Defence Diego Molano; Former President Álvaro Uribe

Number
Tens of thousands	Thousands

Casualties
- Deaths: 26 (Colombian government); 75 (NGO estimates); 89 missing
- Injuries: 800+
- Arrested: 500+

A series of protests began in Colombia on 28 April 2021 against increased taxes, corruption, and health care reform proposed by the government of President Iván Duque. The tax initiative was introduced to expand funding to Ingreso Solidario, a universal basic income social program established in April 2020 to provide relief during the COVID-19 pandemic in Colombia, while the legislative Bill 010 proposed several changes in the health care system in Colombia.

Although the courts had anticipated the protests would be widespread, having annulled all existing permits out of fear of further spread of COVID-19, the protests began in earnest anyway on 28 April 2021. In large cities such as Bogotá and Cali, thousands to tens of thousands of protesters took to the streets, in some cases clashing with authorities, resulting in at least six deaths. Protests continued to grow over the coming days, and amidst promises by the president to rework his tax plan, they culminated into a large protest on 1 May, International Workers' Day. On 2 May, President Duque declared that he would fully withdraw his new tax plan, though no new concrete plans were announced. Despite policy adjustments, protests continued, fueled by intense crackdowns and reports of police brutality. By 21 May, protesters had alleged more than 2,000 instances of police brutality, including 27 cases of sexual violence, and around 200 people had been reported missing.

The Office of the United Nations High Commissioner for Human Rights and Human Rights Watch noted abuses by police against protesters, while former President Álvaro Uribe called on the people to support the actions of police and soldiers during the protests.

== Background ==
In April 2021, President Iván Duque proposed increased taxes at a time when the COVID-19 pandemic in Colombia was beginning to worsen as various healthcare systems were failing throughout the country. The pandemic had also hurt the Colombian economy, with 42% of Colombians earning less than US$90 per month, and with one in four Colombians under the age of 28 unemployed. The tax reform was also devised to reduce Colombia's increasing fiscal deficit, which had resulted in international credit rating agencies downgrading the Colombian government's bonds thus raising the cost of borrowing.

Ingreso Solidario, a universal basic income social program introduced by the Duque government during the pandemic, had already provided at the time thirteen monthly payments of around US$43 to low-income populations since April 2020. Three million of about fifty million Colombians were eligible for Ingreso Solidario payments, with the program being at a smaller scale when compared to other Latin American countries. According to Merike Blofield, director of the German Institute for Global and Area Studies' Latin American division, "Compared to other countries in the region, the coverage that Ingreso Solidario offers is extremely weak [...]. For the 3 million people that got it, it certainly made a difference. But there were five times as many households that needed it."

The Duque government, seeking to expand the program to include 1.7 million more people and to establish a permanent basic income program, chose to pursue a tax reform for funding. The tax increase on many Colombians was presented as a way to provide US$4.8 billion for Ingreso Solidario. Duque's tax reforms included the expansion of value-added taxes on more products such as food and utilities, the addition of some middle-class earners into a higher tax bracket and the removal of various income tax exemptions.

A controversial legislative bill, Bill 010, proposed to reform health care in Colombia. Plans to privatize Colombia's health care system amid the pandemic, as well as the hasty method used to file the bill through a special committee in the House of Representatives that did not require congressional debate, also fueled discontent among Colombians.

Colombians were simultaneously experiencing the third-highest number of COVID-19 deaths in Latin America, the worst economic performance in fifty years with a gross domestic product decreasing 6.8 percent in 2020, and an unemployment rate of fourteen percent. Colombians were also angered by the proposed tax increase and organized a national labor strike similar to the 2019–2020 Colombian protests. In addition to the tax and healthcare reforms, strike organizers demanded a universal basic income at the nation's minimum wage level, additional support for small businesses and a ban on using glyphosate-based herbicides, including other requests.

== Timeline ==
In preparation for protests, Judge Nelly Yolanda Villamizar de Peñaranda of the Administrative Court of Cundinamarca ruled on 27 April that permits to demonstrate in cities across the country be annulled, banning public demonstrations due to health risks related to COVID-19. Disgruntled citizens, however, ignored the public bans on protests.

Tens of thousands of protesters began demonstrating on 28 April 2021, with strong protests occurring in Cali where the statue of Spanish conquistador Sebastián de Belalcázar was torn down by Misak protesters. In Bogotá, tens of thousands protested and clashes with authorities began later in the day, with four thousand protesters maintaining their activities throughout the night. Two were killed on the first day of protests.

Police presence increased on 29 April when General Eliecer Camacho of the Metropolitan Police of Bogotá announced that 5,800 police would be deployed during the demonstrations. Some TransMilenio stations were also closed prior to further protests, with the government stating the closures were due to damage. The leader of the Central Union of Workers (CUT) described the 28 April demonstrations as a "majestic strike" and called for further protests throughout Colombia. Protests overall were in smaller numbers across the nation.

Protests would continue throughout Colombia on 30 April, especially in Cali, Bogotá, Pereira, Ibagué, and Medellín, with some demonstrations occurring in other smaller cities as well. President Duque first announced that he would not remove the tax reform, although he later stated that his government would consider removing some of the more controversial proposals from the tax reform plans. The mayor of Cali, Jorge Iván Ospina, responded to President Duque, stating: "Mr. President, the tax reform is dead. We don't want it to cause more deaths. Please, withdraw it, I am asking you for this on behalf of the people of Cali". In preparation for Workers' Day protests, the government deployed 4,000 troops and police officers to Cali.

On 1 May, International Workers' Day, tens of thousands of people protested in one of the largest demonstrations during the wave of protests, with cacerolazos heard in various cities. Minister of National Defense Diego Molano, a business administrator, said in Cali "according to intelligence information, criminal and terrorist acts in Cali correspond to criminal organizations and terrorists", relating the protesters to splinter groups of the Revolutionary Armed Forces of Colombia (FARC). During the evening, President Duque said during a speech that he would increase the deployment of troops to cities experiencing violence.

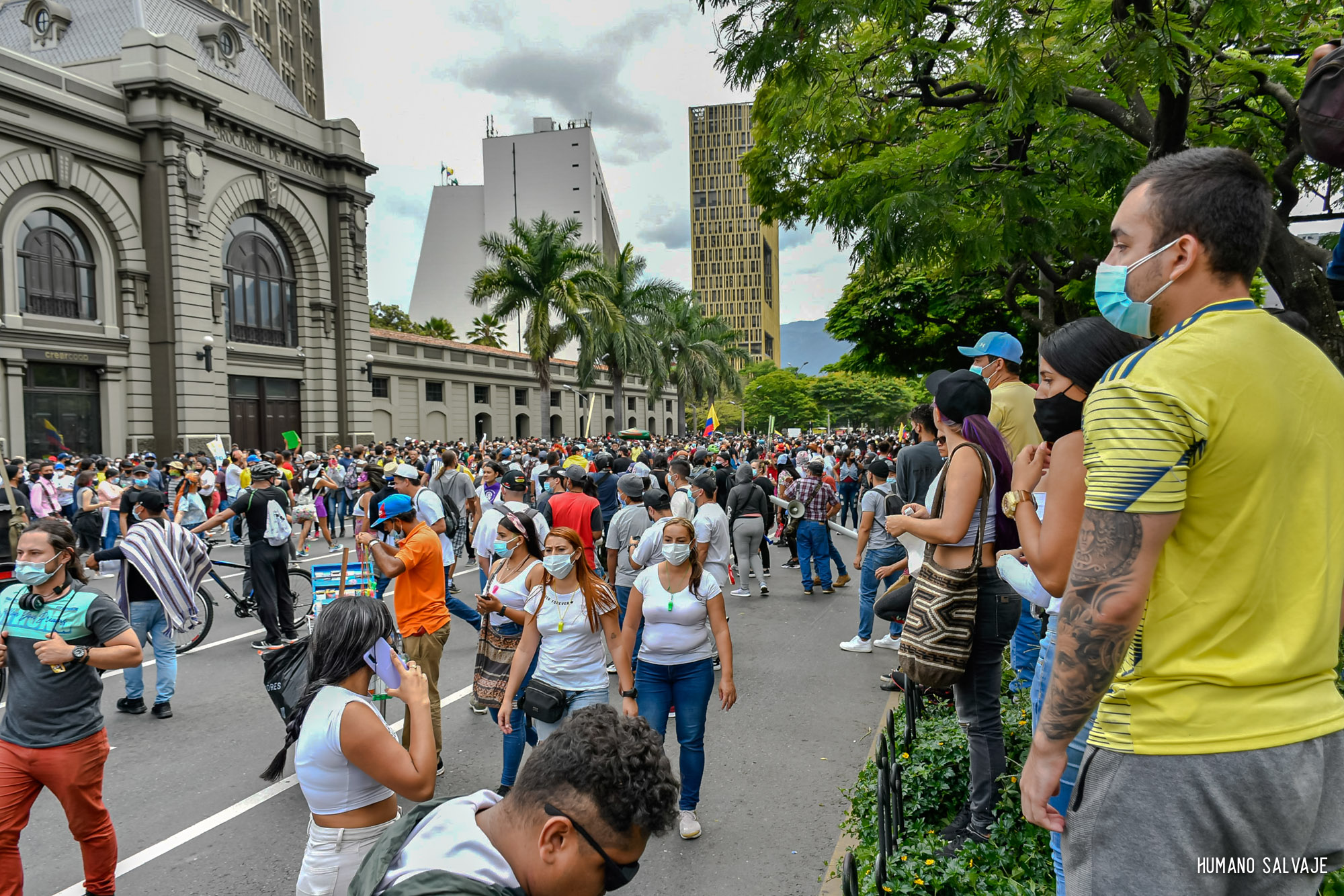
Protesters in Medellín on 28 April 2021

President Duque announced on 2 May that he was withdrawing the tax reform, although he stated that reform was still necessary. Duque said that the tax reform "is not a whim, it is a necessity." Despite the elimination of the tax reform, protests continued to be promoted by organizers.

The National Strike Committee announced on 3 May that another day of protests would be held on 5 May, criticizing the Duque government for not convening with groups to make negotiations. During the first week of May, hundreds of university students turned off their webcams during virtual classes and shared posts online in solidarity with the strike.

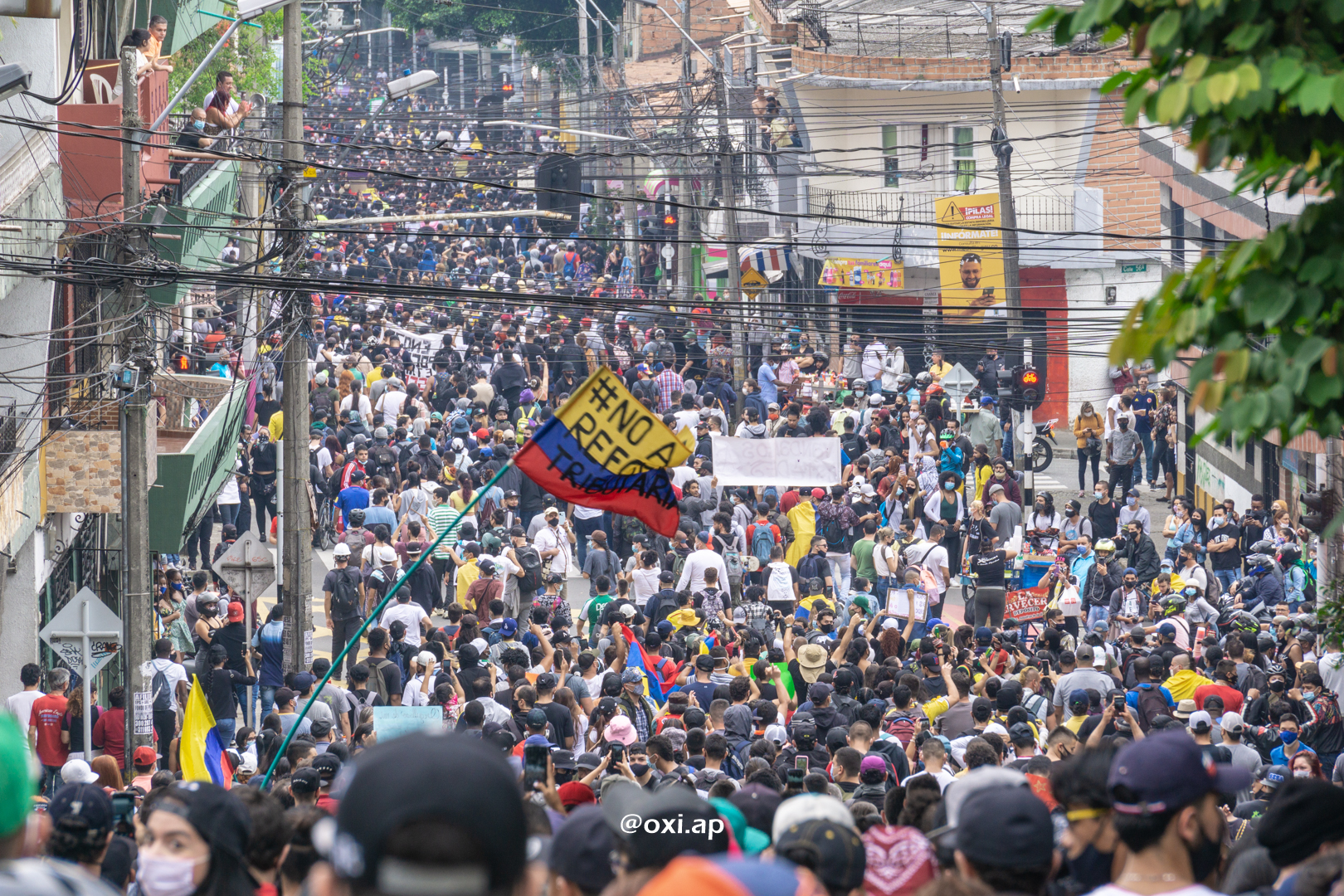
Protest in Medellín on 1 May 2021

President of Ecuador Lenín Moreno and Vice President of Colombia Marta Lucía Ramírez released statements on 5 May 2021 alleging that the protests were organized by Venezuela, stating that they were supported by President of Venezuela Nicolás Maduro. President Moreno, speaking at an Inter-American Institute for Democracy (IID) meeting in Miami beside Secretary General of the Organization of American States Luis Almagro, stated that "the intelligence organizations of Ecuador have detected the gross interference of dictator Maduro, ... in what is happening right now in Colombia". Vice President Ramírez would also release a statement saying that the protests were "perfectly planned, financed and executed" by Venezuela, stating that Maduro was attempting to install an allied government. Minister of Foreign Affairs of Venezuela, Jorge Arreaza, rejected President Moreno's accusations, saying that the Ecuadorian president was attempting to distract from his own "incompetence". Later in the day, protesters attempted to storm the Capitolio Nacional in Plaza Bolívar, Bogotá while some legislative sessions were occurring and were dispersed by authorities.

On 20 May 2021, Colombia was removed as co-host for the 2021 Copa América amid the ongoing protests. Road blockades continued through 20 May, most prominently in the departments of Cauca, Huila, and Valle del Cauca, in spite of a recent presidential order protecting protesters' freedom of movement. The blockades caused shortages in food and gasoline and made it harder for exports to leave the country. Protests against the celebration of football matches have been part of the debate.

A car bomb was detonated at a military outpost on Colombia's border with Venezuela in Cúcuta on 15 June 2021. The attack resulted in thirty-six people injured, with the United States embassy in Bogota reporting that U.S. troops present experienced insignificant injuries. Days later on 25 June, President Duque traveled to Cúcuta by helicopter with Minister of Defense, Diego Molano, Minister of the Interior, Daniel Palacios and the Governor of Norte de Santander, Silvano Serrano. While in a landing approach towards Camilo Daza International Airport, Duque's helicopter was struck by six rounds of gunfire. Paramilitary groups denied being involved in the attack.

== Protest violence ==
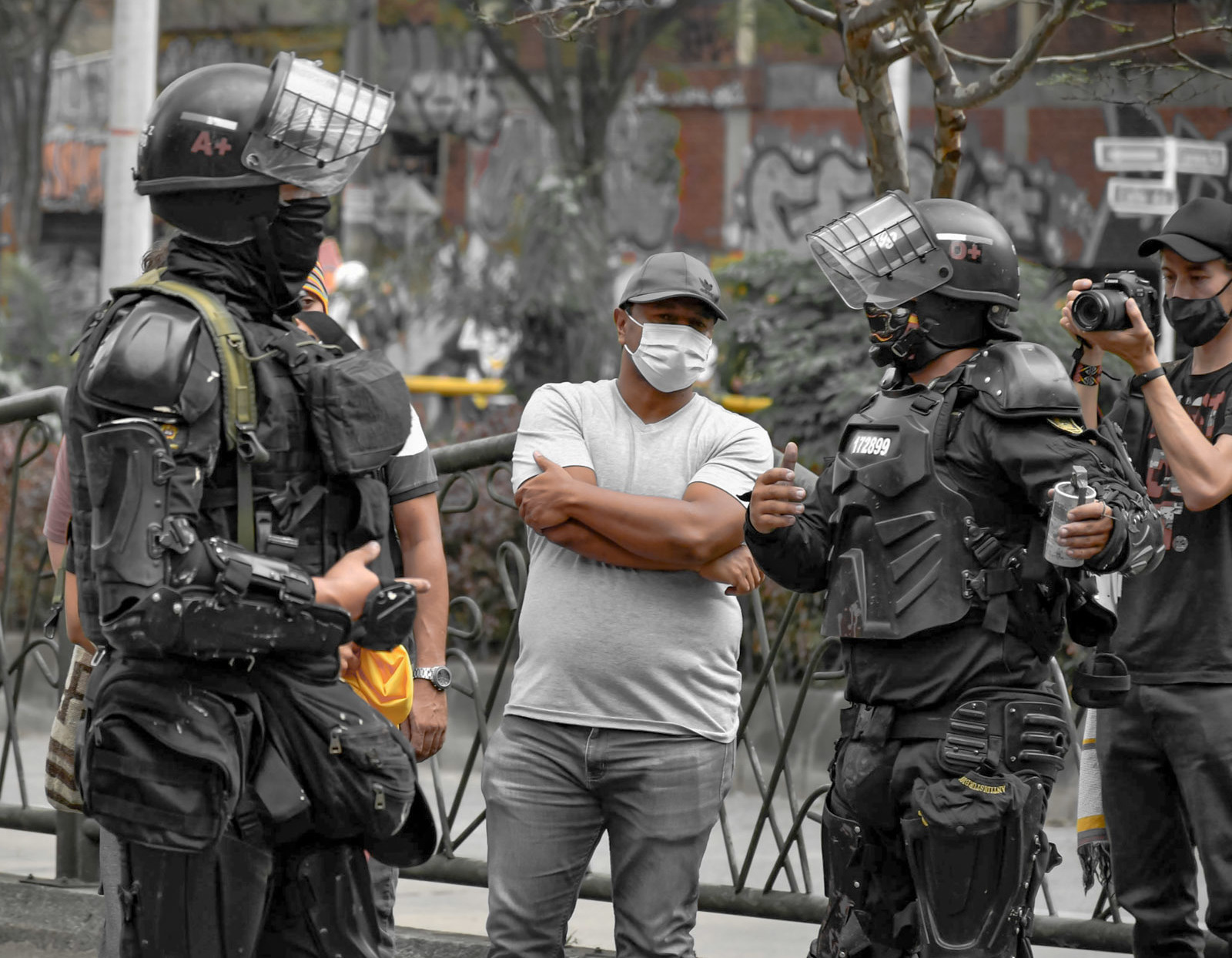
A protester speaking with members of the Mobile Anti-Disturbance Squadron

Although the majority of protests were peaceful, several acts of vandalism occurred, mainly in Cali and Bogotá. In Cali, several buses and stations of the mass transit system MIO were vandalized and burned. About sixty percent of the MIO network was destroyed during protests.

On 1 May, Ombudsman of Colombia Carlos Camargo said that six had died during protests during the week, including five civilians and one police officer, and that 179 civilians and 216 police officers were injured. Human rights groups at the time provided different numbers, saying that at least fourteen were killed during the protests. By 3 May, the ombudsman reported nineteen deaths related to the protests, while the non-governmental organization Temblores reported twenty-one dead and the Colombian Federation of Education Workers (Fecode), which helped lead protests, reported twenty-seven deaths.

During the night and early morning of 3 May, in the city of Cali, 5 people died and 33 were injured due to clashes between protesters and the police and ESMAD. In the Siloe neighborhood, a peaceful demonstration was violently broken up by members of the public force. Numerous videos denouncing acts of brutality by the Colombian authorities were uploaded on social networks and in the media. In the La Luna neighborhood, also in Cali, that same night, a hotel was burned. While some versions suggest that a group of people incinerated it, others point out that the fire is the product of the ammunition explosion that ESMAD had.

=== Pereira firearm attack ===
On the night of 5 May, in Pereira, a firearm attack against protesters by an unknown individual occurred. A crowd began to disperse on the viaduct at around 6 in the afternoon, and a small group of people remained. The protesters were blocking the César Gaviria Trujillo Viaduct, a 700-meter bridge that connects the municipalities of Dosquebradas and Pereira. According to witnesses, a motorcycle approached and 8 shots were fired. 3 people were injured: Lucas Villa, Andrés Felipe Castaño (who is a minor) and Javier Darío Clavijo. The attackers then fled the scene. Some videos show student Lucas Villa protesting that same day in the morning, shouting "they are killing us", a phrase popularized in the demonstrations. Several videos show Lucas Villa as a protester who danced, and even shook hands with members of ESMAD. Minutes before the attack, recorded on video, Lucas and another person receive a soda and a package of meals. However, between 1 and 8 seconds of the video, a green laser is seen on Lucas's body. At second 10, a purple laser points at his head. Some witnesses claim that Lucas was followed up.

Lucas Villa gave a speech later. A video was posted on social media. The last words of the speech were "The ignorant, the stubborn, the sleeping, wake up." 17 seconds later, the sound of a motorcycle is heard and a cry that said "son of a bitch" is heard, and then 8 shots are fired. According to a witness, "the one who shoots arrived on a Biwis motorcycle. The only thing I saw were the fireworks. They got into the roundabout next to the viaduct, attacked at point-blank range and went that way. The man said: 'For fagots, for blocking.'” Seconds later an ambulance is heard passing in the direction of Pereira. Two witnesses told La Silla Vacía that they called to attend to the injured, but that the vehicle did not stop.

Lucas Villa was considered "a peaceful activist and was seen in all the demonstrations singing, dancing", according to his aunt. He later became a symbol during protests. Social networks of individuals close to Villa indicated that he was possibly brain dead.

The Secretary of Government of Pereira, Álvaro Arias Vélez, offered a reward of up to 50 million pesos for those who give information to the authorities that allow them to find those responsible for the attack. The reward later went up to 100 million pesos.

Andrés Felipe Castaño, who is a minor and received four shots, is in serious health. Little is known about Javier David Clavijo, another wounded man, but it is known that he is also in serious condition.

Between May 10 and 11, doctors confirmed Lucas Villa's brain death. "In compliance with the protocols established by our healthcare center, his family and loved ones were informed first-hand. To all of them, his friends and acquaintances, we reiterate our voice of condolence," said the hospital that was treating him.

==== Reactions ====
Several people rejected the attack, including President Iván Duque. The death of Lucas Villa generated negative reactions. Several protesters between the days before and after his death displayed banners with drawings and messages of support for him.

Influencer Elizabeth Loaiza received harsh criticism for posting a video calling Lucas Villa a vandal. "When you did not miss the medicines for the elderly and the sick, you became a genocide. You shot at the ideals and stomachs of those who do not follow you in your dance of death. You were not a hero in this story. You were a bandit", said the recording. Although she assured that she simply wanted to know the opinion of her followers, Elizabeth Loaiza received criticism from several users for sharing the audiovisual piece, which lasts almost a minute.

The video was later deleted. However, she published a message that reads: "I deactivated the comments because there are people so brutal that their eyes do not let them see further and they do not take the time to read what I put. Read dear. Do not criticize without first reading. Do not be lazy. Read, that's why we are as we are." She later made her official Instagram account private due to the wave of criticism she received.

=== Cases of sexual abuse ===
Amid the protests, various complaints of sexual abuse have been reported.

Alison Salazar, (Note: Her name changes across the sources, sometimes she appeared as Alison Lizeth Salazar Miranda, others as Alison Melendez, or even as her Facebook username Alison Ugus.) young 17-year-old teenager, took her own life one day after she was abused by 4 members of ESMAD. The young woman was walking to the house of a friend while she recorded the demonstrations that were near her, in the city of Popayán. A friend also accompanied her. However, in the middle of the road, she was stopped by members of ESMAD. The four officers repeatedly punch the young woman as she struggles against them. Then, between the four of them, they take the girl's body in a fetal position. "You're taking off my pants, you idiots," she cries out in a video capturing her arrest. "Let me go! You're stripping me naked."

Some time later they arrived at the Popayán Immediate Reaction Unit. She was detained for an hour and a half, along with two other minors, who isolated them in a separate space. At 10 pm, because she was a minor, she was taken to the house of her maternal grandmother with whom she lived.

Shortly after, on her Facebook account, she reported what happened with a message: "They had to grab me between 4 bastards? I am the one they caught, at no time do they see me throwing stones, I was not going with them, I was heading towards the house of a friend who would let me stay at his house, when I least thought they were on top, I didn't even run because it was worse, the only thing I did was hide behind a wall, and just because I was recording they grabbed me, in the middle of that they lowered my pants and they groped me to the soul, in the video it is clear that I told them to let go of me because they were "undressing" me by taking off my pants. But they almost hurt them when they reviewed my documents and realized that I am the daughter of a Police, I fully support the strike and the demonstrations, but yesterday I WAS NOT WITH THOSE OF THE MARCHES." The young teen was found dead the next day, apparently she committed suicide by drowning with a plastic bag.

The commander of the Police of the Suroccidente regional, Ricardo Alarcón, went ahead to deny the facts and classify the evidence as "false, vile and mean news."

Days later, the Prosecutor's Office pointed out that the adolescent "was accompanied by a human rights defender" within the URI and that for that reason no sexual abuse was configured in that place. However, an investigation will continue to be made as to whether, with her conduct, the officers who detained her incurred other crimes such as excessive public force and abusive sexual acts.

The office of the Immediate Reaction Unit of the Prosecutor's Office in Popayán, where the teenager was detained, was attacked and burned by some protesters.

On April 29, a police officer was abused by civilians in a CAI in the city of Cali. "It was the longest minutes of my life," she said in an interview with RCN. According to the woman, the attack occurred on April 29, when the second day of demonstrations against the Duque government's failed tax reform took place in Cali. The uniformed woman reports that she arrived at her turn at 2:00 a.m. and her mission was to guard one of the epicenters of the protest in the capital of the Valley: Puerto Resistencia.

The woman assures that the demonstrations became so violent that a large group of civilians tried to enter the nearest CAI, after she protected herself from a constant attack with stones. That's when her nightmare began. “They pulled me out, dragging me. I was begging for my life. He held me on all sides. I held onto the doorframe, but it was useless. There were many” she added.

"They knocked me to the ground, on the right side of the CAI and mercilessly began to beat me, insult each other and began to strip me of all my belongings," explained the woman, who in an interview revealed her anguish for remembering what happened. At one point, she explained to her, they tortured her with hers own elements of her service, until she managed to escape from her in a vehicle that was nearby.

=== Armed civilians ===
In Cali there have been reports of people dressed in plainclothes shooting against demonstrators. Several videos show some civilians with rifles and weapons next to the police, shooting at protesters. On 29 May, the National Police announced that an investigation would be opened.

=== Human rights ===
Groups have said that multiple human rights violations occurred during the protests, though the Duque government initially denied that any occurred. The violent response of authorities towards protesters promoted even more demonstrations, with groups saying that police are using their position to attack civilians. On 3 May 2021, Fecode reported 1,089 instances of police violence, 726 arbitrary detentions, 27 killed and 6 acts of sexual violence. The same day, Temblores reported 672 arbitrary detains and 92 cases of police violence.

Human Rights Watch said that it had received reports of abuse by police officers in Cali. José Miguel Vivanco, head of Human Rights Watch Americas, criticized Colombian authorities, saying "there are structural problems of militarization of the Police, and lack of controls and supervision. ... Colombia needs to open an urgent debate on these enormous deficiencies". Vivanco said that President Duque's rhetoric condemning violence against protesters was a move towards the right direction, though he cautioned that of the previous investigations against police violence during the 2019 and 2020 protests, the Colombian government closed sixty percent of the cases and only two individuals were sanctioned for their behavior.

== Media ==
=== Allegations of censorship ===
Internet connection is reported to have been cut off in Cali as of 4 May 2021 16:30 local time. The Siloe neighborhood was the most affected during an unexpected internet crash, which occurred twice on 4 and 5 May. After the reports and complaints, Emcali explained that "Our fixed internet access service has been working in optimal conditions for our internet clients, Emcali is not a mobile internet operator and guarantees internet service as an essential service in Cali and the area of influence", in addition to indicating that they do not carry out "massive intentional interruptions in the provision of services, public services or telecommunications". Anonymous, who have supported the protests and declared war on the government of Iván Duque, also denounced the status of Colombia's internet. Several users on social networks have rejected the situation and have considered it censorship.

Since 5 May 2021, Instagram users who are sharing content from the protests in their stories, mainly in Colombia, are reporting the application has been erasing this content.

=== Allegations of disinformation ===
Caracol and RCN have been criticized for instilling fear against protests and mainly showing and reporting vandalism. Protesters tried to enter RCN facilities on 28 April due to negativity towards the channel.

On 30 April, the day President Duque announced changes to the tax reform, in its last broadcast of the evening news, Noticias RCN showed some videos of protesters in the streets of Cali, while a journalist said: "With harangues and singing the anthem of Colombia and the city at different points, [the Caleños] celebrated [Duque's] announcement". Because of this, RCN was criticized for "misinforming" and "lying" about the event. Some media, such as Colombia Check and La Silla Vacía, verified that the information was incorrect: the RCN newscast had taken the images out of context and adapted them to a headline that did not correspond to what happened in the place. The following day, in its midday broadcast, the director of Noticias RCN, José Manuel Acevedo, said that "Regarding that news recorded last night in our broadcast at 11:30 pm in which we recorded a celebration of protesters from Cali, after learning about the government's decision to modify sensitive aspects of the tax reform, I want to be clear: there we see a reaction from the people who were conglomerates who were celebrating their victory over the government and not a government victory. People who were protesting there were not applauding the executive. I leave this express clarity and confirm that we will continue to report seriously as we have always done". The response was not well received (especially by Cali residents), and Noticias RCN's tweet was filled with criticism and ridicule against the channel.

=== Social media ===
Several people have used social media to invite people to protest, as well as to denounce acts of repression and attacks by some protesters and members of the public force. On Twitter, #LaVozDeUribeSomosTodos, which began as a trend used by Uribe followers due to the removal of a controversial tweet by former president Álvaro Uribe that Twitter removed for "glorifying violence", ended up being used by some followers of K-pop in Colombia to publish content related to this type of musical genre. Other Uribism and anti-protests trends on Twitter have been covered up by K-pop posts.

In 2022, a YouTube video went viral showing a protester single-handedly resisting a water cannon with a homemade shield. As of 2026, it has over 6 million views.

== Reactions ==
=== National ===
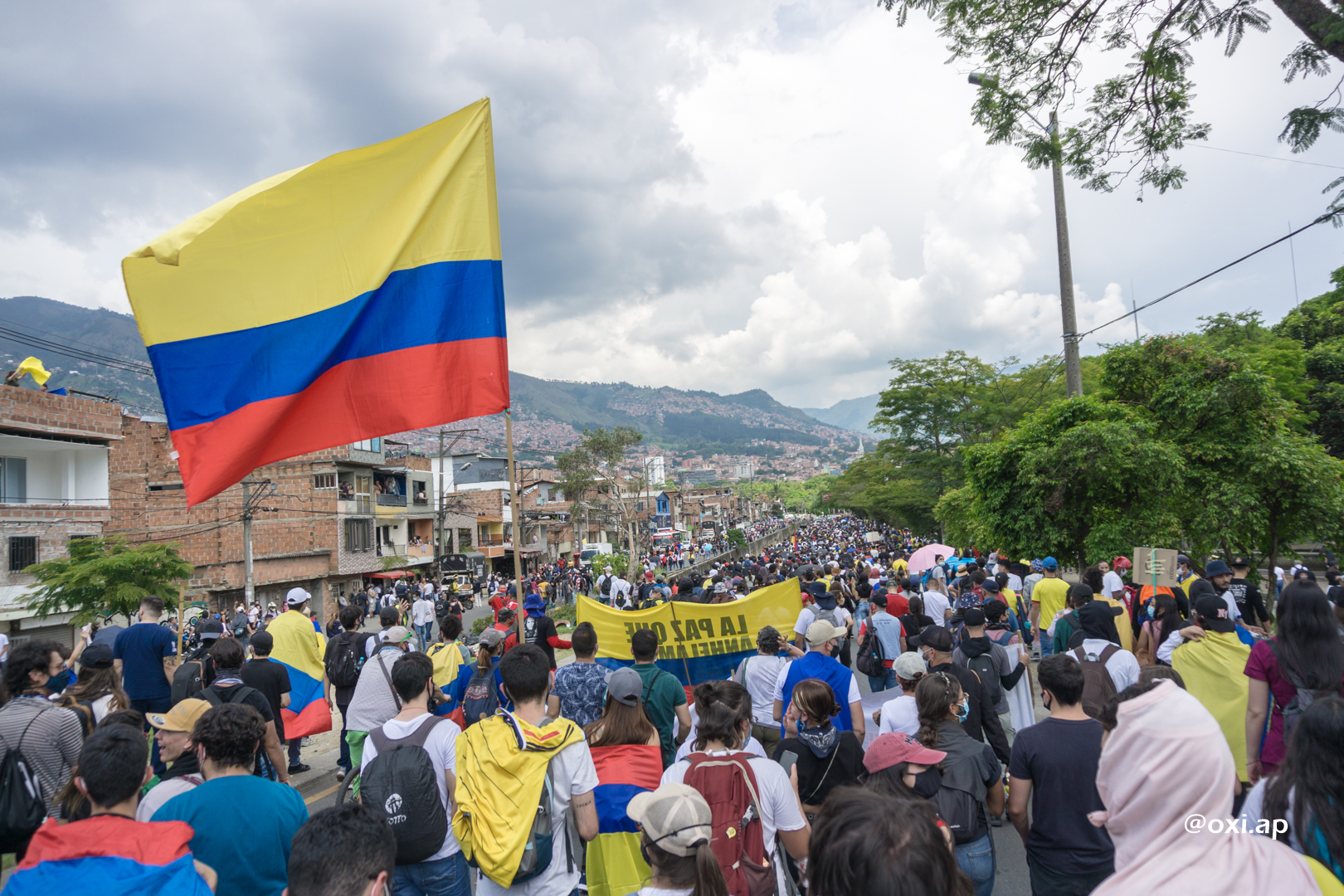
Protesters in Medellín on 1 May 2021

Various individuals were in favor of the protests, such as senator and former presidential candidate Gustavo Petro, who invited Colombians to participate in the strike, as well as the senator Gustavo Bolívar. In addition, the actresses Lina Tejeiro and Esperanza Gómez, the comedian Alejandro Riaño, the actor Julián Román, the singers Adriana Lucía, Mario Muñoz, Karol G and other influencers such as Luna Gil supported protests. In the same way, Colombian artists such as Shakira, Juanes, J Balvin, Maluma as well as athletes Egan Bernal, Radamel Falcao, Juan Fernando Quintero, René Higuita, among others, have demonstrated in solidarity with the victims, calling for an end to the violence while demanding the government to listen to the Colombians.

Nearly 8,000 researchers in the country signed a letter voicing opposition to police brutality, and the presidents of the nation's seven largest universities signed a letter proposing six policy changes following the protests.

Former president Álvaro Uribe Vélez, a right-wing politician, tweeted "Let's support the right of soldiers and police to use their firearms to defend their integrity and to defend people and property from criminal acts of terrorist vandalism". Twitter removed the tweet, saying that it was an act of "glorifying violence". Journalist Vicky Davila, former Bogotá mayor Enrique Peñalosa and former Colombian football player Faustino Asprilla rejected the protests.

=== International ===
==== Governments ====
- Argentina: President Alberto Fernández said he was following with "worry" the events in Colombia and condemned what he called "repression against social protests" and "implemented institutional violence". He also said he was "begging for an end to the conflict."
- Chile: The Minister Spokesman for the Government of Chile, Jaime Bellolio, declared that "the violation of human rights must be prosecuted without nuances", when referring to the situation in Colombia.
- Ecuador: President Lenín Moreno accused the government of Venezuela for instigating the protests, demanding the Venezuelan government to "stop interference".
- Peru: The Foreign Ministry of Peru reported that: "it deeply regrets the acts of violence and the victims that occurred in Colombia," and stressed that both countries are united by good relations and cooperation.
- Spain: The Minister of Foreign Affairs of Spain, Arancha González called for "calm, the end of violence and dialogue" as the only way to "redirect the discrepancies" in Colombia.
- United Kingdom: Three members of parliament asked Foreign Secretary Dominic Raab to "demand an end to the unacceptable state violence against civilian protesters".
- United States: The United States Department of State asked the Colombian government for "maximum restraint" on the part of the public forces to avoid further loss of life. In the same way, Democratic House Representative Gregory Meeks demanded a reduction in violence. Democratic Representative Jim McGovern, for his part, denounced the use of excessive force.
- Venezuela: The Attorney General of Venezuela, Tarek William Saab, in a message posted on his Twitter account on Sunday noted that: "The Duque Government [is] massacring the population that repudiates the criminal structure of that narco-state." He also questioned the silence of the Organization of American States, the United Nations Organization and the United Nations High Commissioner for Human Rights, Michelle Bachelet.

==== Supranational organizations ====
- United Nations: The Secretary General of the United Nations, António Guterres, expressed his concern about the police repression against the protests in Colombia. He invited the Colombian authorities to exercise restraint during the protests.
  - Regarding the United Nations High Commissioner for Human Rights in Colombia, Commissioner Juliette de Rivero reported that members of the High Commission were threatened and attacked in Cali while investigating the violation of human rights against the protesters.
- European Union: The spokesman for the European Union, Peter Stano, said that "we are closely monitoring the situation, and we condemn acts of violence" and reported that "it is really a priority to contain the escalation of violence and avoid the disproportionate use of force".
- ALBA: Condemned the excessive use of force by Colombian security agents in the protests through a statement: "The Alliance, faithful to the principles and purposes of the United Nations Charter, international law, respect for the self-determination of the peoples, social justice and peace, condemns the excessive use of force by security agents of the Colombian State".

==== Others ====
Colombian students protest in Tyumen, Russia on 5 May 2021

Protests have also taken place in other countries, such as Chile, Canada, France, Germany, Japan, Portugal, Spain, Sweden, the United Kingdom, and the United States.

Numerous celebrities including Justin Bieber, Kim Kardashian, Demi Lovato, Nicky Jam, Residente, Ibai Llanos, Thalía, AuronPlay, Luisito Comunica, Viola Davis, among others, have expressed their sympathy with the Colombian people and, especially, with the victims of the violence from the police.

Progressive International released a statement condemning police brutality and Duque's government, while also calling "the world's progressive forces to answer its call, and hold the Duque government to account in every community, every courthouse, and in every parliament where we work". Following reports that weapons manufactured in the United States were being used by Colombian police, Amnesty International called on Secretary of State Antony Blinken to stop arms sales from the U.S. to Colombia.

== See also ==
- 2018 student protests in Colombia
- 2019–2020 Colombian protests
- 2024 Colombian protests
- Javier Ordóñez protests
- Protests over responses to the COVID-19 pandemic
- List of protests in the 21st century
- 2020–2021 Thai protests
- Myanmar protests (2021–present)
