= 2022 Colombian protests =

2022 protests against Colombian government reforms

- Part of protests over responses to the COVID-19 pandemic
- Date: 26 September 2022 – 31 December 2022 (3 months and 5 days)
- Location: Colombia
- Caused by: Government-led left-wing cross-sectoral structural reforms of the State requiring a record-breaking taxation; Corruption; Crime
- Goals: Withdrawal of reforms; Resignation of President Gustavo Petro and Cabinet of Gustavo Petro; Resignation of Mayor of Bogotá Claudia López; Resignation of Mayor of Cali Jorge Iván Ospina
- Methods: Protests, demonstrations and online activism

Parties
Protesters: National Protest Organizing Committee "No Más Petro"; Civilians	Government of Colombia: National Army of Colombia; National Police of Colombia

Lead figures
Social leaders and government opposition	Gustavo Petro; Francia Márquez

Number
Thousands	

A series of protests began in Colombia on 26 September 2022 against left-wing cross-sectoral structural reforms of the State requiring a record-breaking taxation, proposed by the government of President Gustavo Petro in order to respond to the challenges of the post-COVID-19 pandemic times. Following his inauguration on 7 August 2022, the newly installed President Petro put forward legislative bill proposals to reform the defense sector and the military police, open peace negotiations with the ELN and other armed guerrilla groups, reestablish bilateral relations with Venezuela, change the legal framework regarding drug use and narcotrafficking, and introduce tax reforms, among others.

In large cities such as Bogotá, Medellín and Cali, hundreds of protesters took to the streets. The national protest organizing committee "No Más Petro" has scheduled new rounds of protests every month, the second to be held on 24 October 2022.

== See also ==
- 2018 student protests in Colombia
- 2019–2020 Colombian protests
- Javier Ordóñez protests
- 2021 Colombian protests
- Protests over responses to the COVID-19 pandemic
- List of protests in the 21st century
