= Angelo Cardona =

Colombian social entrepreneur and activist

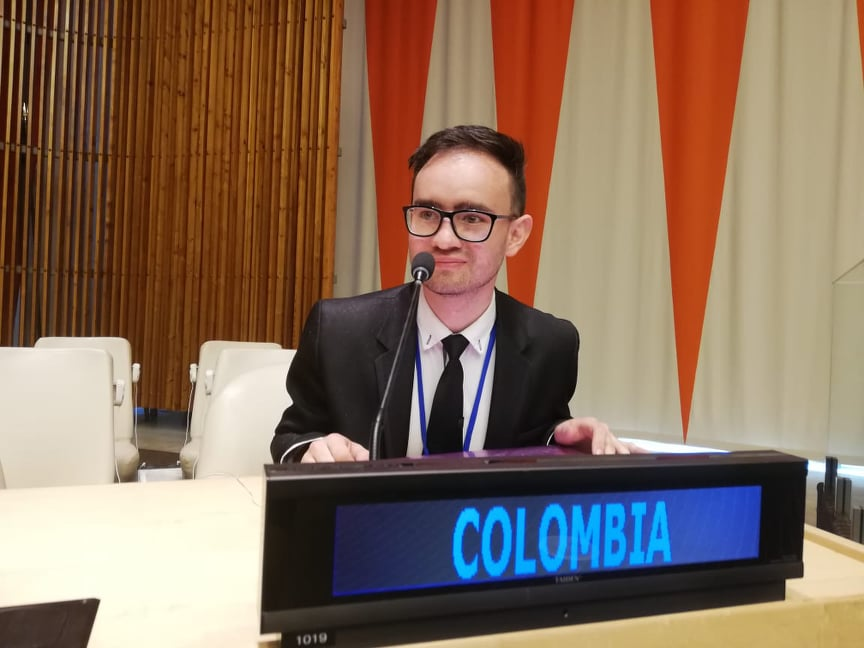
- Cardona at the UN 2019
- Born: 5 January 1997 (age 29); Soacha, Colombia
- Occupations: Peace Activist, Human rights defender, Social entrepreneur, Speaker
- Years active: 2008 – present
- Organization: Ibero-American Alliance for Peace
- Board member of: International Peace Bureau World Beyond War
- Awards: 21st Century Icon Awards (2019); Diana Award (2021); Youth Leadership Award (2021)
- Website: angelocardona.com

Angelo Cardona (born 5 January 1997) is a Colombian social entrepreneur, diplomat, and human rights activist. He serves as coordinator of Latin America and Representative of the International Peace Bureau to the United Nations. He is also Co-founder and executive director of the Ibero-American Alliance for Peace. In 2021, he won The Diana Award.

== Career ==
Cardona has denounced the human rights violations that his country is experiencing in different international decision-making scenarios such as the United Nations Headquarters, European Parliament, German Parliament, British Parliament, United States Congress, Argentina Congress and Colombian Congress.

He served as peace ambassador of the Global Peace Chain, ambassador of Colombia to the Youth Assembly at the United Nations from 2022 to 2024, and in 2018 was invited by Amnesty International to Berlin to share his knowledge about the implementation of the peace agreement in Colombia.

He is part of the Youth for Disarmament initiative of the United Nations Office for Disarmament Affairs and was among the winners of the '75 words for disarmament' launched by the United Nations to commemorate the 75 years of its foundation and the atomic bombings of Hiroshima and Nagasaki.

In 2016, at age 19, he became a member of the International Peace Bureau. In 2019, Cardona was appointed as Council Member of the International Peace Bureau, and three years later, he became a member of its Board.

Cardona is also part of the international Steering Group for the Global Campaign on Military Spending (GCOMS). As part of the campaign in 2020, together with 28 Colombian members of Congress, he proposed the transfer of 1 billion Colombian pesos from military purposes to the health sector. The Colombian Ministry of Defense agreed to 10 percent of that, moving 100 million pesos (or US$25 million). In 2021, he was supported by 33 Colombian members of congress who demanded the President of Colombia, Iván Duque, allocate 1 billion pesos from the defense sector to the health sector. Cardona also requested the Government to refrain from purchasing 24 warplanes that would cost $4.5 million. According to him, with that money, the government could purchase at least 300,000 vaccines against COVID-19 and strengthen the health system in the country. On May 4, 2021, amid violent protests unleashed in Colombia as a result of the proposal for a new tax reform. The Minister of Finance, José Manuel Restrepo, announced that the Government will comply with the request to not purchase the warplanes.

== Awards and honors ==
- 2019, Cardona along with Asha de Vos, were the co-recipients of the 21st Century Icon Awards - Inspirational Icon Award
- 2020, 75 Words for Disarmament Award of the United Nations Office for Disarmament Affairs.
- 2021, Award in honour of the late Diana, Princess of Wales - The Diana Award.
- 2021, The Youth Leadership Award at the Napolitan Victory Awards.
- 2021, The Diana Legacy Award.

== See also ==
- Colombian Conflict
- International Peace Bureau
- List of peace activists
