= 2007–2008 Colombian protests =

The 2007–2008 Colombian protests was a series of nationwide rallies and massive peaceful uprisings in support of the government's crackdown on Revolutionary Armed Forces of Colombia and deemed an end to the Colombian conflict. Anti-war demonstrations have dominated areas nationwide, such as Bogotá and Pereira. The first wave of protests and revolts was in July 2007, when 1.5 millions demonstrators marched in public protests for a week after calls of protests against the Colombian conflict. The protests remained peaceful and is one of the largest protest movements in the History of Colombia. The second wave of public and peaceful, popular demonstrations was in February 2008 and October 2008 as protests against president George W. Bush of the United States visiting Colombia. Two men were killed in October's protest movement and the February's protest movement remained peaceful and calm.

== See also ==
- 2019–2020 Colombian protests
