= Global Campaign on Military Spending =

- Abbreviation: GCOMS
- Formation: 2014; 12 years ago
- Type: Non-profit international campaign
- Headquarters: Barcelona, Spain
- Location: International
- Fields: Disarmament, reduction of Military Budget
- Key people: Joseph Gerson, Angelo Cardona, Reiner Braun, Jordi Calvo Rufanges, Chloé Meulewaeter, Francesco Vignarca
- Website: www.demilitarize.org

The Global Campaign on Military Spending (GCOMS) is a global campaign that was created in December 2014 by the International Peace Bureau (IPB) to tackle the worldwide issue of excessive military spending.

The aim of the campaign is to pressure the world's governments to invest money in the sectors of health, education, employment and climate change rather than military. It also calls for an annual, minimum reallocation of 10% from the military budgets of all states. Finally, it advocates the reduction of arms production and international weapons trade.

The campaign organises the Global Day of Action on Military Spending (GDAMS) to bring public, media and political attention to the costs of military spending and the need to invest in new priorities.
