= Ibero-American Alliance for Peace =

International non-governmental organization

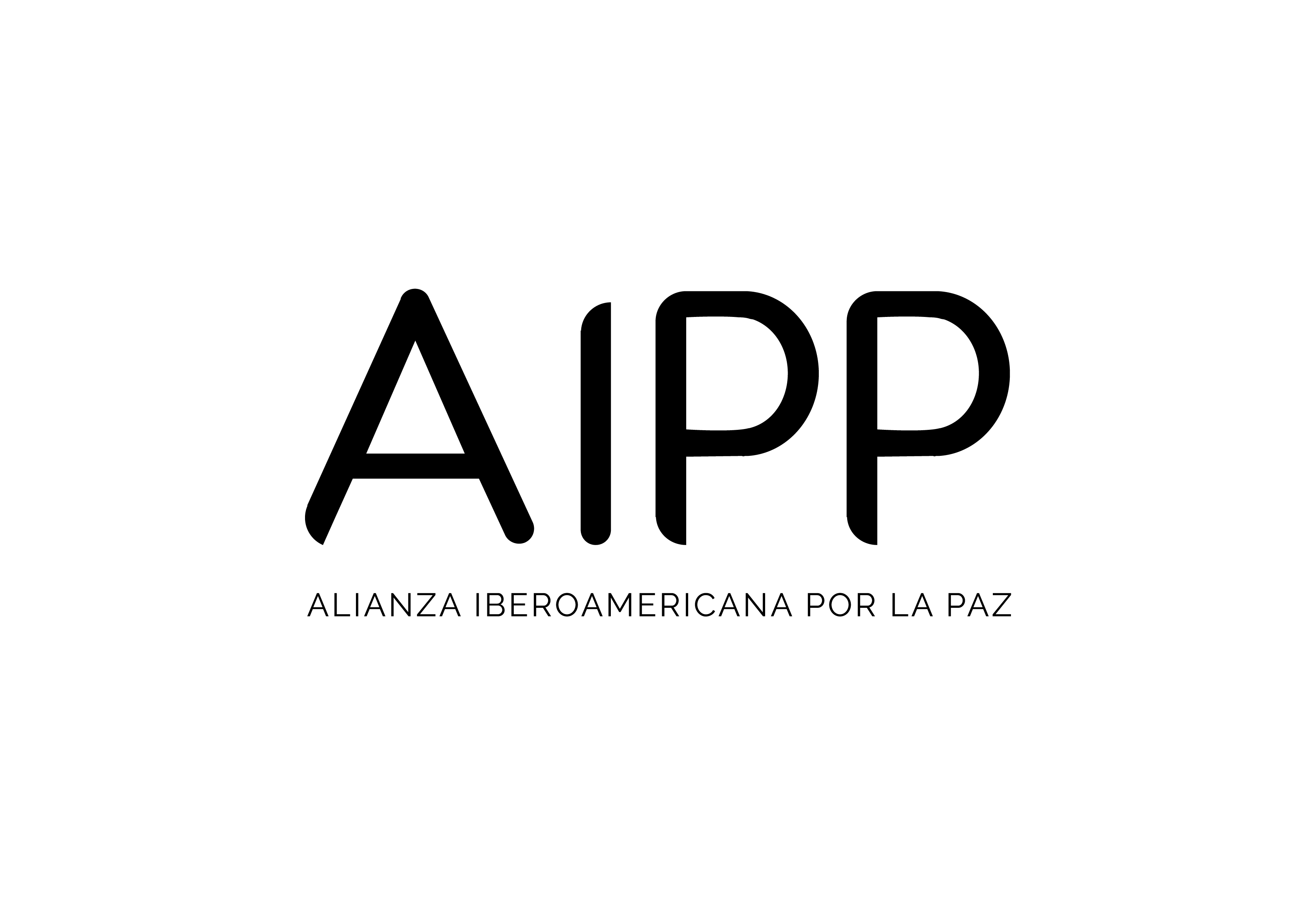
- Abbreviation: AIPP
- Formation: 2018
- Founders: Angelo Cardona and Maria Teresa Barrios
- Founded at: Berlin, Germany
- Type: Nonprofit; INGO
- Purpose: Peacebuilding, Human rights, Disarmament
- Headquarters: Castellón, Spain
- Region served: International
- Official language: Spanish; Portuguese
- Presidents: Angelo Cardona (Colombia) and Maria Teresa Barrios (Argentina)
- Executive Director: Chloé Meulewaeter (Belgium)
- Vice president: Quique Sánchez Ochoa
- Website: alianzaibero.com

The Ibero-American Alliance for Peace (Spanish: Alianza Iberoamericana por la Paz) is an international non-governmental organization working to promote peacebuilding, human rights and disarmament in the Ibero-American region. Co-founded in 2016 by Angelo Cardona and Maria Teresa Barrios in Berlin during the world congress 'Disarm for a Climate of Peace' of the International Peace Bureau. Initially the coalition was the International Peace Bureau Youth Network (IPBYN) for the region of Latin America known under the name of Latin American Youth Network for Peace'

== History ==
In 2018, the International Peace Bureau Youth Network began to prepare a series of pre-conferences of youth for peace around the world, which would end in the world conference, 'Transform! Towards a Culture of Peace.' in Berlin, 2019. So that the Youth Network could make their conferences in Latin America with a name in Spanish, Cardona and Barrios founded the Latin American Youth Network for Peace (in Spanish: Red Latinoamericana de Jóvenes por la Paz) along with the members of the IPBYN in Latin America. The network is launched in the first pre-conference of the IPBYN, on April 25, 2018 in Medellín, Colombia, during the 2nd International Congress of Science and Education for development and peace' at the University of Antioquia. Then, the Latin American Youth Network for Peace, carried out the second pre-conference, on July 3, 2018, in the Senate of the Argentine Nation, during the international conference 'Let's Talk about Peace'. The Latin American Network held its third pre-conference, on October 9, 2018, this time at the Tecnologico de Monterrey campus in Mexico City. In 2020, the members of the IPBYN in Latin America decided to change their name to Ibero-American Alliance for Peace.

== Ibero-American Forum for Peace ==
The Ibero-American Forum for Peace is a summit of the Spanish- and Portuguese-speaking nations of Europe and the Americas organised by the Ibero-American Alliance for Peace. The gathering brings academics, civil society organisations, activists, human rights organisations, and governmental and non-governmental organisations around the theme of peace in the Ibero-American region. The forum bills itself as ''a space for debate for citizens to have a meaningful and transformative discussion on peace, human rights, disarmament and related issues.''

The summit held in 2021 in Castellón, Spain, was attended by people of Argentina, Brazil, Guatemala, Spain, Bolivia, Chile, Mexico, Venezuela, Peru, Nicaragua, Ecuador, Guatemala, Uruguay, Cuba, Dominican Republic, Colombia, Honduras and other countries like Italy, Haití, United States, Lebanon and Romania. It was organised in cooperation with the Center for research, defense and promotion of the rights of children and adolescents (ILÊWASI, for its name in Catalan) and the Jaume I University of Castellón.

== Summits ==
Since its formation in 2018, the Alliance has carried out different summits in the Ibero-American region.

N.º	Location	Date
1st	Colombia	25 April 2018
2nd	Argentina	3 July 2018
3rd	Mexico	9 October 2018
4th	Spain	23 - 25 June 2021

== See also ==
- Organization of Ibero-American States
- Ibero-American Summit
- Community of Latin American and Caribbean States
- Organization of American States
