= Joseph Gerson =

American peace and disarmament activist

Joseph Gerson is an American peace and disarmament activist. He is president of the Campaign for Peace, Disarmament and Common Security and vice-president of the International Peace Bureau. Since 1976 he has served the American Friends Service Committee as director of the Peace and Economic Security Program.

== Early life and education ==
Gerson was born in Plainfield, New Jersey. He earned a bachelor of Science in Foreign Service at Georgetown University and received his Doctorate in Politics and International Security Studies from the Union Institute.

== Activism ==
He started his activism during his years as a student at Georgetown University. He participated on the 1967 March on the Pentagon. He is member of the international Steering committee of the Global Campaign on Military Spending and the No to war – no to NATO Network.

== Bibliography ==
- Gerson, Joseph (2015-11-30). Empire and the Bomb: How the U.S. Uses Nuclear Weapons to Dominate the World. Pluto Press. doi:10.2307/j.ctt18dzt92. ISBN 978-1-84964-304-7. JSTOR j.ctt18dzt92.
- Gerson, Joseph; Birchard, Bruce; American Friends Service Committee Disarmament Program; American Friends Service Committee New England Regional Office (1991). The Sun never sets-- : confronting the network of foreign U.S. military bases. Boston, Mass.: South End Press. ISBN 0-89608-399-3. OCLC 22908902.
- Gerson, Joseph. (1995). With Hiroshima eyes : atomic war, nuclear extortion, and moral imagination. Philadelphia, PA: New Society Publishers. ISBN 0-86571-329-4. OCLC 31969306.

== See also ==
- American Friends Service Committee
- Pacifism in the United States
- List of peace activist
