= 2024 Colombian protests =

- March of the white coats
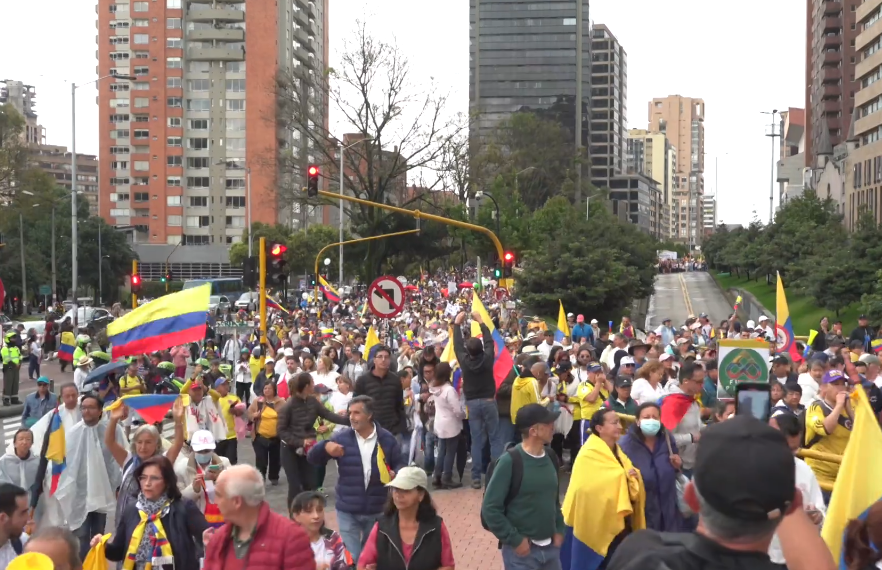
- Date: 21 April 2024
- Location: Colombia

A series of protests occurred in Colombia on 21 April 2024 against the administration of president Gustavo Petro. Motivations for the protests were diverse, such as concerns about low morale among the public force, as well as opposition to several Petro-led reforms, as well as to his proposal for the creation of a constitutional assembly. Assistants to the protests included members of the opposition, as well as the former Petro supporters and healthcare workers. Much of the opposition was due to the governments move to a public-funded healthcare system from privatized healthcare.

Estimates for attendance to the protests vary widely; Blu Radio reported that municipal authorities estimated the number of attendants being 350,000 in Medellín, 90,000 in Bogotá, 35,000 in Cali, 10,000 in Ibagué, 5,000 in Pasto, 4,000 in Barranquilla and 1,500 in Cartagena, while reporting that president Petro said that 250,000 assisted to the protests nationwide. English-speaking Bogotá-based The City Paper reported "more than a million" attendants nationwide reporting attendance of 400,000 people in Bogotá, 250,000 in Medellín, 100,000 in Barranquilla and "a similar turnout" in Cali.

== Background ==
As for Petro's presidency, multiple legislature initiatives were provided, considering healthcare, pensions and labor policies. One of the most significant parliamentary opposition arguments against the reforms was the fact that the they would damage the economy. That dispute led to the following rivalry between the establishment and the opposition, and public protests.

The Colombian healthcare system has been facing long-term issues, related to the funding of private medical intermediaries, or EPS (es. Empresas Promotoras de Salud). EPSs are private medical insurers in Columbia. It was reported, how both the government and private intermediaries owe state medical institutions: EPSs owed state medical institutions around 25 trillion COPs (Columbian pesos), while the government was reported to owe 2 trillions COPs. The president Petro has initiated a reform that considered taking control over two major EPSs entities – Nueva EPS and Sanitas – and creating the governmental institution for managing debts. On 3 April, 2024, the reform was rejected by right-wing and liberal parliamentaries.

== See also ==
- 2022 Colombian protests
