= 2018 student protests in Colombia =

The 2018 student protests in Colombia, or the national university strike in Colombia in 2018 was carried out between October 10 and December 16, 2018. It consisted of a series of protests and mobilizations carried out by students from public and private universities in Colombia due to the crisis of financing public education and its subsequent decision to its underfunding and the state repression of the country's student movements. It was carried out during the government of Iván Duque.

== Background ==
In September 2018, the National Congress announced the General Budget of the Nation for 2019. The education sector, with $ 41.4 billion, was assigned the highest amount, followed by defense, with $ 33.6 billion, which was insufficient for the maintenance of Colombian public universities, since $ 500 billion is needed to close 2018; $ 3.2 trillion for operational expenses, and $ 15 trillion to pay off the “historical debt” in infrastructure and educational quality. Law 30 of 1992, which regulates transfers from the nation to universities, adjusted resources based on the consumer price index (CPI). This means that there is no growth of the resource, but a correction of the money year after year. Which despite the increase in university coverage does not finance this increase in coverage.

Other causes of the strike were the "Ser Pilo Paga" program that received resources from Public Education to keep subsidized students in private universities, the economic policy of ICETEX, and the repeal of Law 1911 of 2018. Previously, student mobilizations have had an important role in the political life of the country: during the conservative hegemony of the 1920s, the protests during the dictatorship and the fall of General Rojas Pinilla, the 1971 National University Strike, the University protests. National in 1984, the seventh ballot of 1990, the Student Movement of 2011 against Law 30 of 1992, among other stories of this movement in the country.

== Organisers of the protests ==
The organisation of the strike was in charge of students from 32 public universities in the country (State University System), which would be joined by private universities, teachers and parents. A part of the student movement was welcomed under the platforms gathered in the so-called Broad Front for the Defense of Public Education: National Union of Higher Education Students, UNEES. Colombian Association of Student Representatives, ACREES. Colombian Federation of Student Representatives of Higher Education, FENARES. Trade Union Association of University Professors, ASPU.

== Development of unemployment and unrest ==
- On October 10, 2018, the March for Higher Education in Colombia is held in the main cities of the country by students, teachers and parents.
- On the 11th the National University Strike is announced.
- On October 16, Iván Duque announced that he was looking to allocate an additional $ 1 trillion to invest in higher education in the next two years.
- On October 26, the rectors of 32 universities meet with the president, reaching an agreement, which the students reject, considering it insufficient.
- On October 31, the Zombie March is held to "revive public universities." Making it clear that his goal was to get the Government to allocate $ 4.5 billion to public institutions of higher education in the country.
- On November 8, another march is called due to the failure of the dialogues between the government and students, in Bogotá it takes place towards the north of the city, there are riots.
- On November 15, the students call the March of Books and Pencils. To return to the table, they demand that the Minister of Finance, Alberto Carrasquilla, be there.
- On December 13, the last march of the year was held within the framework of the National University Strike.
- On December 14, after 16 sessions of the negotiation table, it was agreed, between student representatives and the Minister of Education, María Victoria Angulo, for the National Government, to lift the strike.

== Consequences and aftermath ==
Human rights violations are reported by ESMAD, which intervened in the strike mobilizations, as in the case of Esteban Mosquera, a music student at the University of Cauca, who lost an eye. The national government was able to will allocate 4.5 billion pesos for education, unprecedented in the history of Colombia. It is proposed that a referendum be held for free public higher education14 and respect for university autonomy and its consolidation. However, breaches of the agreement are reported, for which students and teachers join the 2019 National Strike. In addition, due to the corruption scandal at the District University (Wilman Muñoz and Patricia Gamboa former officials of this University were imprisoned for the crime of embezzlement) and the protests and disturbances that occurred with it, and other universities in solidarity with the District University (especially the Javeriana University), marches were called for the dismantling of ESMAD and non-compliance with the agreements in the National Pedagogical University, the National University of Colombia, the University of the Atlantic (causing the resignation of the rector of this) among other Higher Education Institutions. In 2020, as a result of negotiations with students, the Ministry of Education and the Government of Casanare reached a financial agreement to convert Unitrópico into a new public university.

== See also ==
- 2011 Colombian student protests
- 2019-2020 Colombian protests
