= Javier Ordóñez protests =

2020 protests in Colombia

- Date: 9 September 2020 – 21 September 2020
- Location: Colombia
- Caused by: Police killing of Javier Humberto Ordóñez

The Javier Ordóñez protests refers to a series of protests and riots in Colombia. The protests started in Bogotá, the country's capital, following the torture and murder of Javier Ordóñez by police officers while in custody on 9 September 2020. The unrest then spread to many cities throughout Colombia. As a results of the protests, 13 people died and over 400 were injured. A UN-backed report categorized the deaths of 11 of the victims as a massacre by the Colombian police. In response to the protests, Defense Minister Carlos Holmes Trujillo announced a disciplinary hearing for the officers involved in Ordóñez's death and said, "the National Police ask for forgiveness."

== Police killing of Javier Ordóñez ==
Protests erupted in response to the police killing of Javier Humberto Ordóñez, a 46-year-old Colombian father of two in the neighborhood of Engativá in Bogotá. In a video of the incident which went viral on social media, Ordóñez could be seen "face down on the ground as two officers kneel on him and repeatedly use their stun guns on him." Ordóñez could be heard saying "enough please, enough, no more, please" and "I am choking." Witnesses to the incident told police to stop repeatedly.

Ordóñez was first transported to a local police station. A friend of his, Juan David Uribe arrived at the station to ask for him and stated, "when I arrived, my friend was practically dead, he was not moving. So I began to yell at police and told them, 'please help him, let's take him to the hospital'." Ordóñez was then transported to a local hospital, where he died shortly after. A family member reported that he had been tasered 12 times and stated "they told us that a person can endure more or less four."

Local police attempted to justify the incident by saying that he had to be subdued. The video initiated thousands of protesters out to the streets. At least seven people died in the demonstrations and police reportedly took 70 people into custody. 248 people were injured, including 100 police. 5 of the people killed were shot. 58 people received gunshot wounds. Claudia López, mayor of Bogotá, stated that "no one had ordered police to shoot at protesters" even though she admitted that this is what ended up happening. A BBC report stated that "there have been 137 complaints of police brutality in Bogotá this year" and that in November 2019 "tens of thousands of people took to the streets in memory of Dilan Cruz, a student who died after being hit by a projectile fired by riot police during an anti-government protest."

Protests also occurred in Soacha, Medellín, and Pereira. The death of Ordóñez and the subsequent protests have been compared to the murder of George Floyd and the subsequent George Floyd protests in the United States.

== Protests ==
On September 9, 2020, various civil and political sectors in Bogotá called for peaceful demonstrations in response to the murder of Javier Ordóñez and the multiple cases of police abuse that preceded him. In relation to these events, demonstrations were also called in capital cities such as Medellín, Barranquilla, Cali, Cúcuta, among others. These peaceful demonstrations were accompanied by acts of vandalism that provoked the response of the National Police, questioned for, allegedly, having caused, throughout the country, injuries and the death of both protesters and passers-by. The presence of the Mobile Anti-Disturbance Squadron (ESMAD), a special unit of the Directorate of Citizen Security (DISEC) of the National Police of Colombia, has been notable for its participation in these violent events.

As the hours progress, the National Police opens fire, causing the death of more than 13 people in different parts of the city and leaving more than 54 wounded with firearms, in addition to 400 injured due to blows with blunt elements, kicks and fists.

== See also ==
- 2019–2020 Colombian protests
- 2021 Colombian protests
