= Emcali =

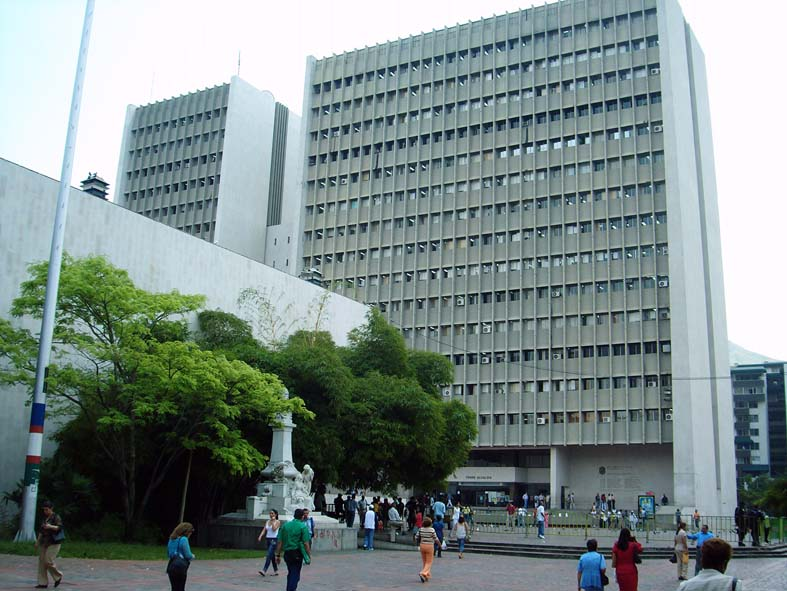
- Headquarters in Cali
- Company type: Public
- Industry: Public utility service company.
- Founded: August 13, 1931
- Headquarters: Cali, Colombia
- Products: Water, Energy, Gas & Telecommunications
- Parent: Cali
- Website: www.emcali.com.co

Empresas Municipales de Cali (informally: Emcali) is a state-owned company providing water, telecommunications, and electricity services in Cali, Colombia. In 2006 it had an income of 1.5 billion Colombian pesos. The General Manager is Fulvio Leonardo Soto.

== History ==
On August 13, 1931, the Municipal Council of Santiago de Cali signed the Public Deed that established the Municipal Companies to offer water supply services, organization of market squares, slaughterhouse and collection of some taxes (shows). Management was delegated to an Administrative Board whose members would be elected every two years, among whom were representatives of the national banks that were creditors of the Municipality, which would manage the company for twelve years.
