= Iván Duque =

President of Colombia from 2018 to 2022

His Excellency Iván Duque ODB ODSC OSP GOM CYC OSC OMDSM GColIH
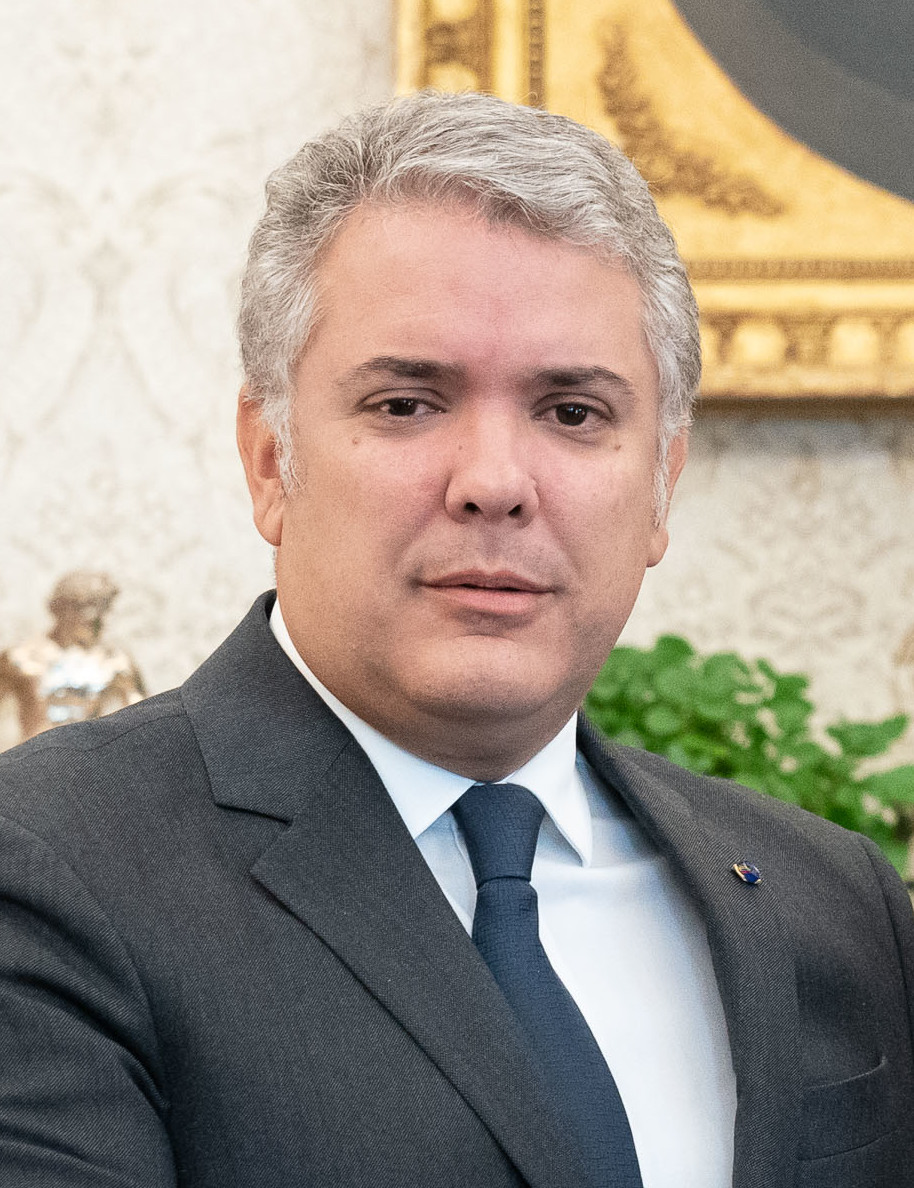
- Duque in 2020

34th President of Colombia
- In office 7 August 2018 – 7 August 2022
- Vice President: Marta Lucía Ramírez
- Preceded by: Juan Manuel Santos
- Succeeded by: Gustavo Petro

President pro tempore of PROSUR
- In office 12 December 2020 – 27 January 2022
- Preceded by: Sebastián Piñera
- Succeeded by: Mario Abdo Benítez

Senator of Colombia
- In office 20 July 2014 – 10 April 2018

Personal details
- Born: Iván Duque Márquez; 1 August 1976 (age 50) Bogotá, Colombia
- Party: Democratic Center
- Spouse: María Juliana Ruiz (m. 2003)
- Children: 3
- Education: Sergio Arboleda University; American University; Georgetown University

Iván Duque Márquez ODB ODSC OSP GOM CYC OSC OMDSM GColIH (Latin American Spanish pronunciation: [iˈβan ˈduke ˈmaɾkes]; born 1 August 1976) is a Colombian politician and lawyer who served as the president of Colombia from 2018 to 2022. He was elected as the candidate from the Democratic Centre Party in the 2018 Colombian presidential election. Backed by his mentor, former president and powerful senator Álvaro Uribe, he was elected despite having been relatively unknown a year before the election. He ran on a platform that included opposing Juan Manuel Santos' peace agreement with the FARC guerrilla group. After Duque's term came to an end, he was succeeded by Gustavo Petro on 7 August 2022, after Petro won the runoff round in the 2022 Colombian presidential election.

Despite personally opposing the peace agreement with the FARC, Duque did not cancel it when in office. During the Venezuelan refugee crisis, Duque had an open door policy toward Venezuelans, allowing them to settle in the country and allowing around 1.7 million refugees to gain protected status in Venezuela. Another major issue that spanned part of his term was the COVID-19 pandemic in Colombia. His rule was marked by protests, the 2019–2020 Colombian protests caused by those who opposed corruption and income inequality, as well as the 2021 Colombian protests against a proposed tax measure. His approval rating had declined, being as low as 30% in his last year in office.

== Life and career ==
Duque was born in Bogotá to a wealthy political family originally from the Colombian town of Gómez Plata, Antioquia. He is the son of Juliana Márquez Tono (born 1950), a political scientist and Iván Duque Escobar (1937–2016), a powerful local political leader who was Governor of Antioquia, auditor in the United Nations, Minister of Mines and Energy, and head of the National Registry of Civil Status in the Government of Andrés Pastrana. Duque's siblings are Andrés and María Paula Duque.

Duque attended Colegio Rochester but obtained his high-school diploma from Colegio Winston-Salem in Bogota. He graduated in 2000 with a law degree from Sergio Arboleda University in Bogotá. He holds an LLM in International economic law from American University and a Masters in Public Policy Management from Georgetown University, Washington D.C.

He began his professional career in 1999 as a consultant in CAF – Development Bank of Latin America and the Caribbean and later served as an advisor at the Colombian Ministry of Finance and Public Credit during the government of Andrés Pastrana Arango (1998–2002).

Subsequently, he was appointed by Juan Manuel Santos, future president and then-Minister of Finance, as one of Colombia's representatives at the Inter-American Development Bank (IDB), a post he held between 2001 and 2013. There he served as chief of the Division of Culture, Solidarity, and Creativity.

Duque also served as international advisor of former President Álvaro Uribe Vélez. Between 2010 and 2011, he was a consultant at the United Nations (UN) in the Panel of Inquiry appointed by the Secretary-General for the Incident of the Gaza Flotilla that occurred on 31 May 2010, between Israel and Turkey, known as Mavi Marmara.

== Political background ==
Duque returned to Colombia to become a candidate for the Senate in the legislative elections of 2014, for the Partido Centro Democrático (Democratic Center Party) which split away from the ruling governing party after Juan Manuel Santos opened peace negotiations with the FARC. This new party campaigned against the new peace agreement and the Santos Government, and was led by right wing former president Uribe.

Uribe created his own political party and presented himself and a list of hand-picked political allies as candidates for the office of Congressman in a closed list, which meant that people could not vote for an individual congressman but had to vote for the party as a whole in both the upper and lower chamber elections. Duque was included in the number seven spot of the closed off list for the Senate and thus was elected senator.

During his time as a senator, he was the author of four laws:

- Law 1822 of 4 January 2017, increasing the maternity leave from 14 to 18 weeks, so mothers could spend more time with their newborn children, a benefit that was also extended to adoptive mothers.
- Law 1831 of 2 May 2017, for the availability of defibrillators in public facilities and places of high public influx, to save lives, since heart attacks are the leading cause of death in Colombia.
- Law 1809 of 29 September 2016, for the use of advanced severance payments for educational insurance, so that more families can send their children to the university.
- Law 1834 of 23 May 2017, the "Orange Law" for the promotion, development and protection of the creative and cultural industries.

== 2018 presidential election ==
On 10 December 2017, Duque was nominated by his party as its candidate for President of Colombia. He won the nomination through a system of surveys conducted by the party, with a 29.47% favorability compared to the other two candidates: Carlos Holmes Trujillo who obtained 20.15%, and Rafael Nieto with 20.06%. In January 2018, it was announced that the center-right coalition would participate in the Grand Primary for Colombia – an interparty consultation – with Duque as its candidate confronting Marta Lucía Ramírez (civil-center right movement) and Alejandro Ordóñez (right wing civil movement). On 11 March 2018, Duque won the primary with more than 4 million votes. Ramírez was second, with just over 1.5 million votes, and Ordóñez came third with 385,000 votes. During his speech, Duque thanked the support of Colombians at the polls and announced Marta Lucía Ramírez as his running mate in the elections.

On 27 May 2018, Duque earned the most votes in the first round of the presidential election with over 39% of the vote. Duque was elected President of Colombia on 17 June 2018 after defeating Gustavo Petro 54% to 42% in the second round.

== Presidency (2018–2022) ==
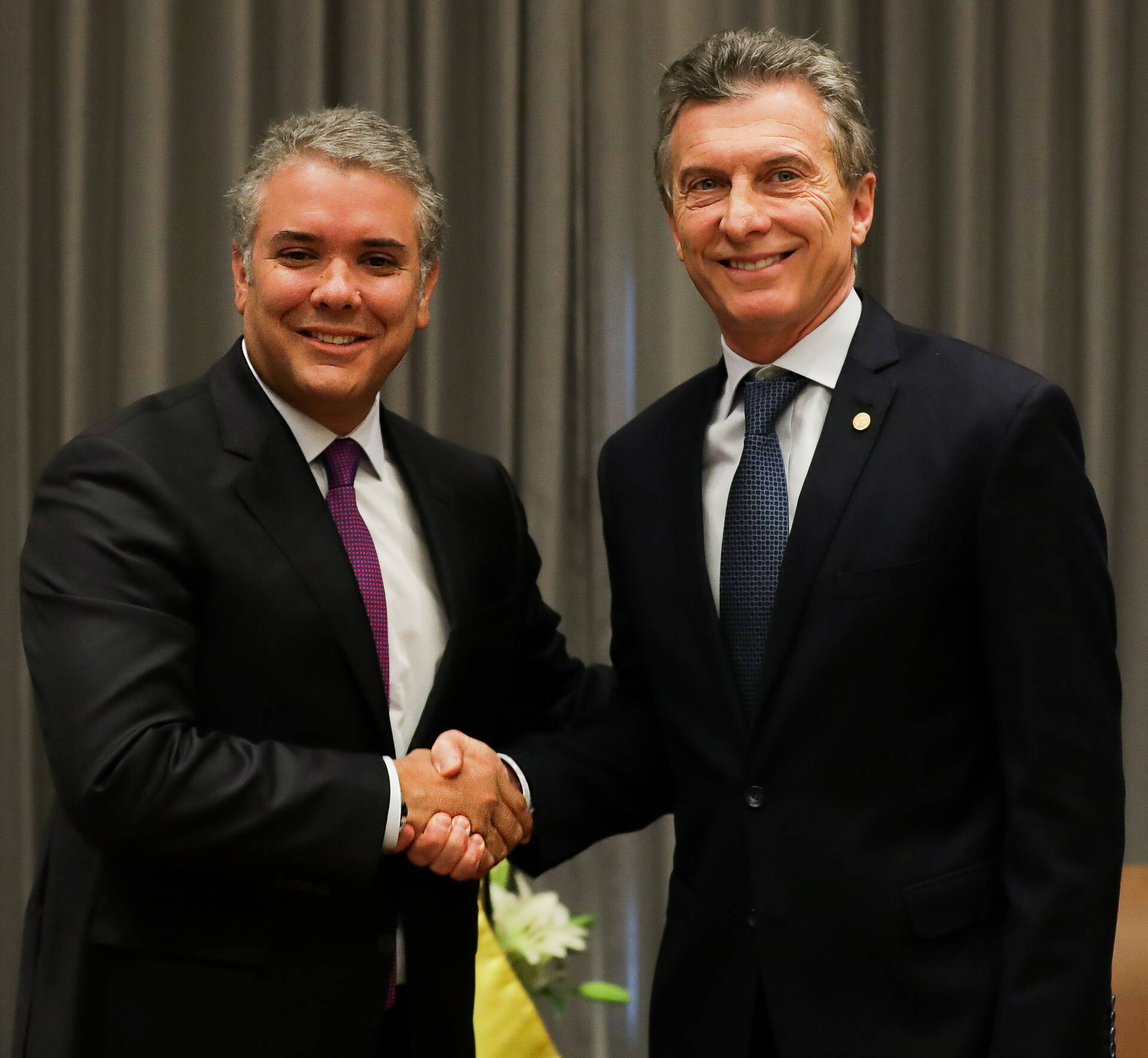
Duque (left) shakes hands with Argentinian President Mauricio Macri in August 2018

Duque was sworn in on 7 August 2018 at Bogotá's Bolívar Square. Duque's government prioritized legality and entrepreneurship, among other areas.

In 2020, after the drug lord "Ñeñe" Hernandez was murdered in Brazil, some audios of him conspiring to give money to Duque's party in order to buy votes for his election were published in what is known as the "Ñeñepolítica".

Duque's term concluded on 7 August 2022 and he was succeeded by Gustavo Petro.

=== Domestic policy ===
Opposed to the peace agreement signed in 2016 with the FARC guerrilla group, Duque, nevertheless stated at the time of his election that he had no intention of "smashing it to bits". As president, he tried to eliminate certain points of the agreement. His government sought to weaken the Special Jurisdiction for Peace and cut the budget of the Truth Commission and the Unit for the Search for Disappeared Persons by 30%. The government also promoted generals involved in extrajudicial executions (see : "False positives" scandal), appoints controversial figures to key positions and halts negotiations with the other guerrilla group, the National Liberation Army (ELN).

Through its National Development Plan 2018–2022, the Colombian government planned to revive the country's gold and copper markets. In addition, 161 new oil drilling sites were planned for 2022, four times more than the 46 existing in 2018. Hydraulic fracturing was legalised in 2019. The plan was widely criticised by environmentalists, who considered it dangerous for the environment and the climate, and offering the country's non-renewable resources to foreign multinationals. The share of extraction profits paid to the state has dropped to 0.4% for gold and silver, and 3.27% for open-cast coal mines. The plan also threatened indigenous communities, whose territories and resources were under threat. In mid-2019 the Pan-American Highway was blocked for several weeks by the mobilisation of thousands of indigenous people in the department of Cauca.

During the COVID-19 pandemic, the Colombian government created the "Prevention and Action" television programme, in which Duque communicated with citizens through a national network, with the Colombian public and private media, broadcasting every day at 6pm. The program enjoyed great popularity initially, since it was shown as an effective means to timely communicate the news about the measures used to contain the spread COVID-19. His approval rating increased at the start of the pandemic, as a result. However, the program was extended over time and lost popularity, as there were no constant news about the pandemic; the program mutated to a space where Duque talked to the public, however the program continued during the start of the 2021 protests, Duque continued to present the television program, which generated strong criticism. By May 2021, as protests continue and the unemployment was out of control, the programme ended.

In 2020, the defence minister Carlos Holmes Trujillo died of COVID-19, and was replaced by Diego Molano. As a result of the COVID-19 pandemic, GDP in Colombia decreased by 6.8% in 2020, the worst drop in the country's GDP in history.

==== Public safety ====
Insecurity in Colombia has increased during Iván Duque's presidency. In four years there have been more than 260 massacres that have left more than 1,100 people dead. Violence against social leaders in the territories has increased substantially. As of 4 June 2022, 930 social leaders had been assassinated. In addition, 245 former FARC combatants who took advantage of the Peace Accords have been assassinated during the Duque government.

==== War on drugs ====
Duque made the war on drugs a central issue of his presidency and called his country "a partner for all of the Western Hemisphere in the fight against drugs." Despite his efforts, however, cocaine production reached record highs during his presidency. With a potential output of 1,400 metric tons in 2022 according to the UN, Colombia remained the world's leading producer of the drug.

=== Protests ===
The 2019–2020 Colombian protests were a collection of protests that have occurred since 21 November 2019. Hundreds of thousands of Colombians demonstrated to support the Colombian peace process and against the Duque government. Demonstrators criticise also the government's desire to make the labour market more flexible, to reduce the public pension fund in favour of private entities and to raise the retirement age . The unions also protested against the tax reform aimed at reducing the taxes paid by companies and against the planned privatisation of public companies such as the oil company Ecopetrol and the electricity company Cenit. The army was deployed in the main cities of the country and a curfew was introduced. The unpopularity rate of Iván Duque reached almost 70%.

The 2021 Colombian protests began on 28 April 2021 against increased taxes proposed by the Duque government amid the pandemic.

=== Venezuelan refugee crisis ===
The Presidency of Ivan Duque has continued the policies of his predecessor Juan Manuel Santos in regards to immigration and the Venezuelan refugee crisis. Ivan Duque's government has been a vocal supporter for the refugees at the United Nations and has provided aid, schooling and health care for many, and has been a vocal critic of other South American countries closing of doors to Venezuelan refugees.

In 2018, Duque dedicated 0.5% of government spending to supporting refugees accounting for about 20% of Colombia's budget short fall, despite opposition. In response to this criticism on a televised address Duque stated: "For those who want to make from xenophobia a political path, we adopt the path of brotherhood, for those who want to outcast or discriminate against migrants, we stand up today ... to say that we are going to take them in and we are going to support them during difficult times."

Duque's policies regarding this issue have received repeated praise from international humanitarian organizations for its efforts to legalize, formalize and offer assistance to refugees, and the Atlantic has noted that it has set the bar welcoming refugees. A representative from the International Rescue Committee has noted that: "[she has] never seen a government trying this hard to register people and leave the borders open. Unfortunately," she added "the scale of this crisis, and the speed at which it changes, is more than Colombia can handle." His decision to provide temporary protected legal status to nearly 1.7 million Venezuelan migrants drew praise from leaders around the world.

=== Foreign policy ===
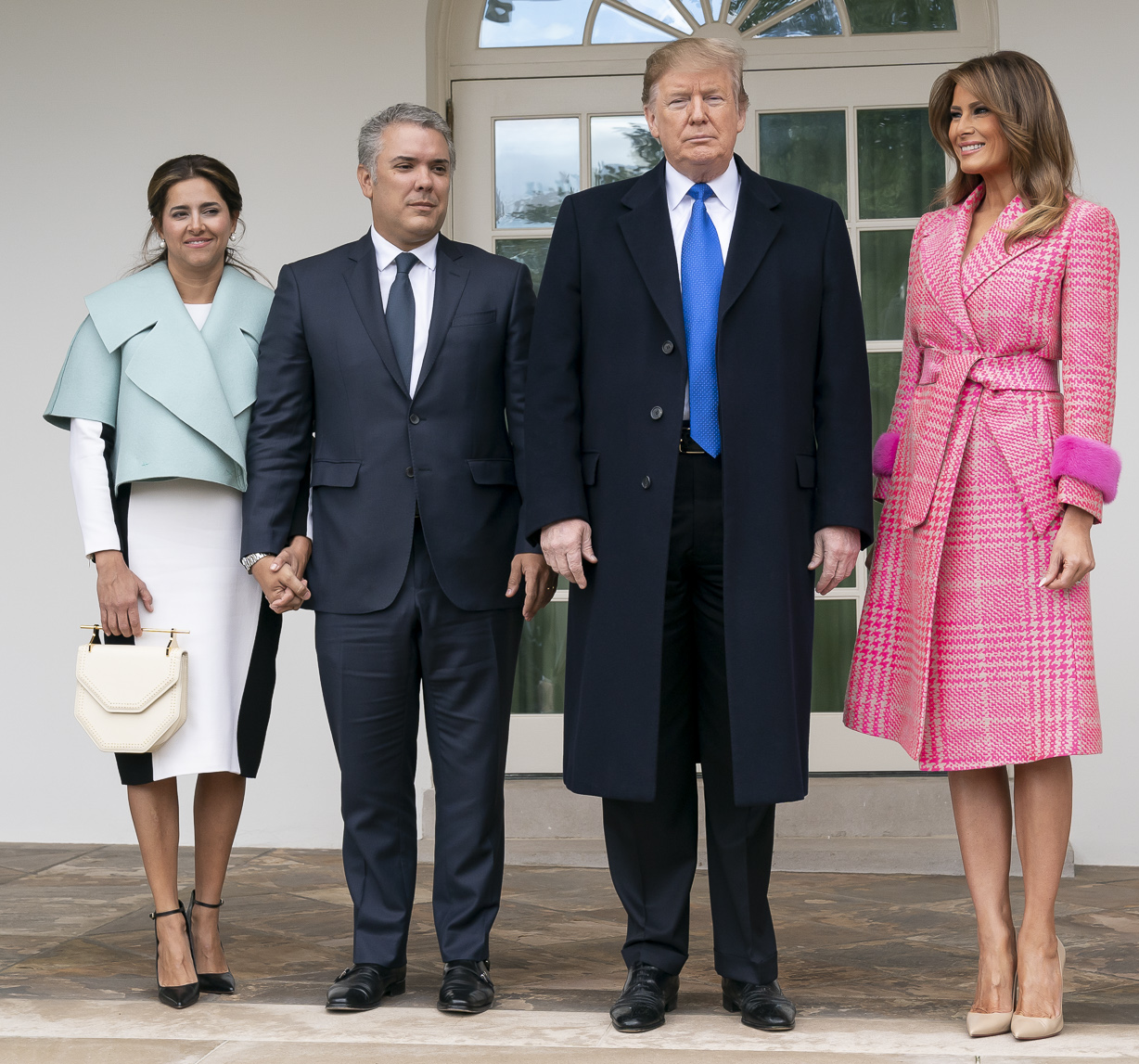
Duque and his wife María Juliana Ruiz Sandoval with U.S. President Donald Trump and First Lady Melania Trump in 2019

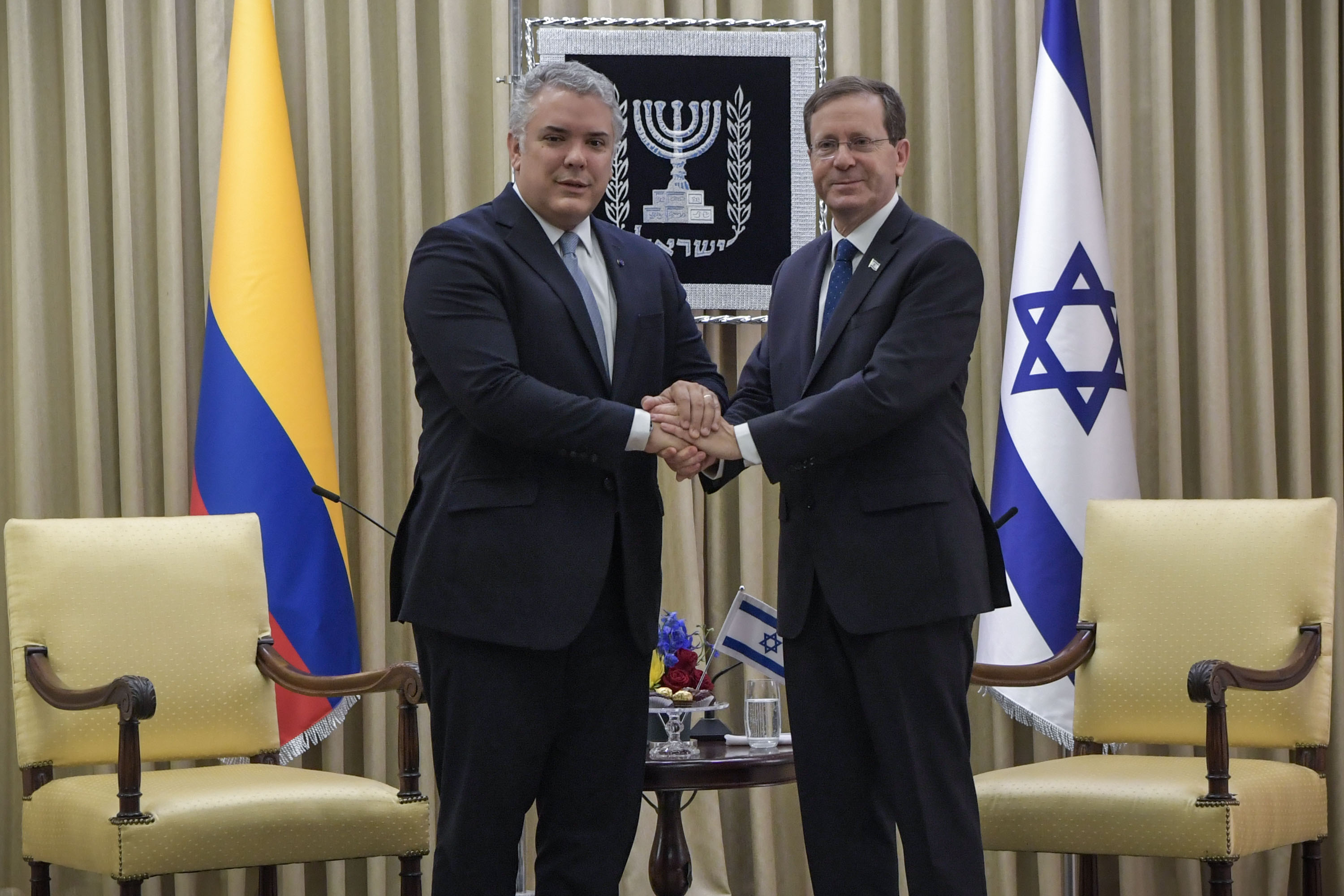
Duque with Israeli President Isaac Herzog in Jerusalem, 8 November 2021

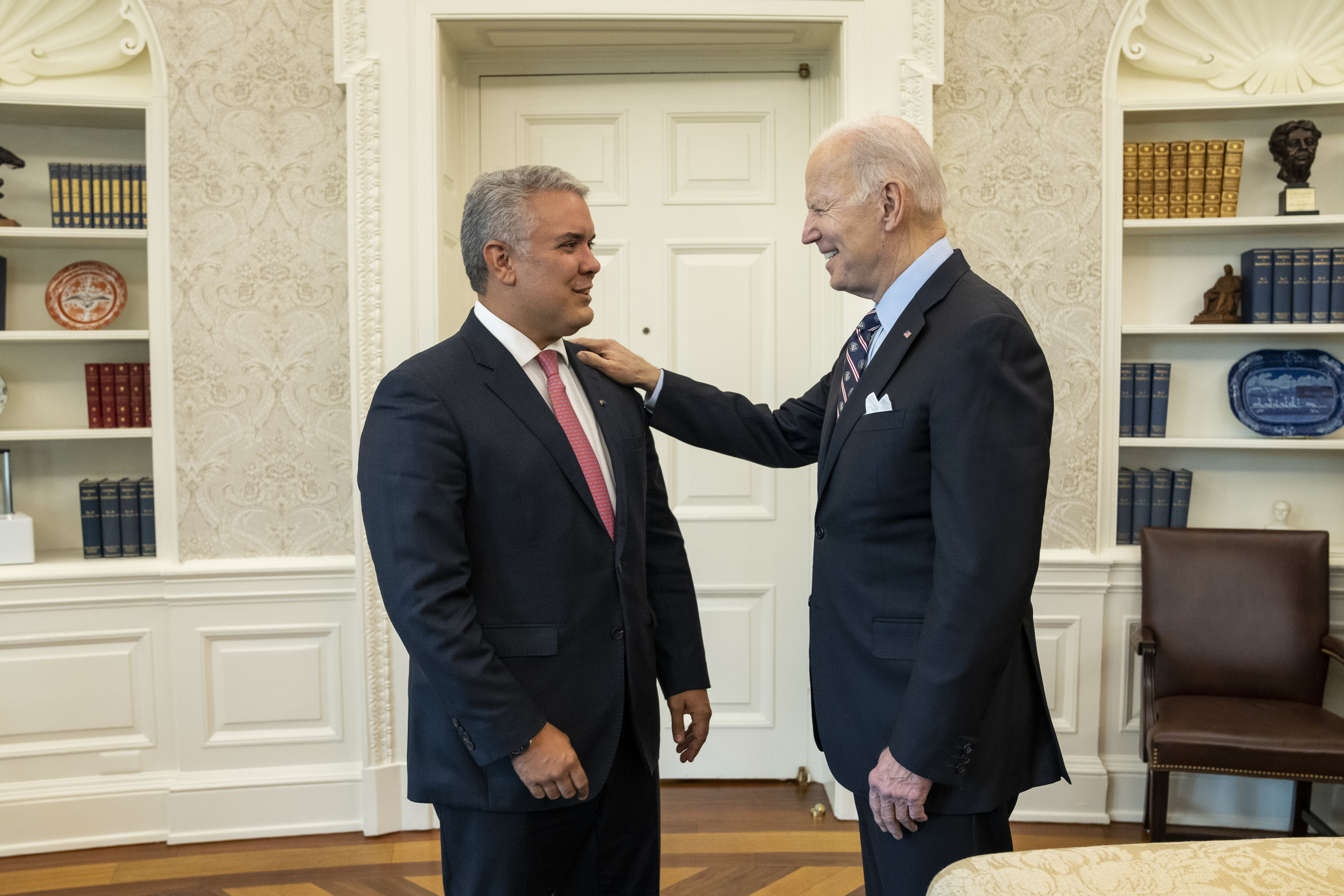
Duque with U.S. President Joe Biden in 2022

Duque pursued very close relations with the Trump administration in the United States and supported its projects in Colombia and Latin America. In return, Colombia benefited from U.S. military support and increased foreign aid funds.

Duque described the Venezuelan government of Nicolás Maduro as dictatorial and supported the Trump administration's efforts for regime change, recognizing Juan Guaido as interim president and encouraging the country's military to back the Guaido government. Duque's government welcomed the removal of Bolivian President Evo Morales during the 2019 Bolivian political crisis, and was accused of interference in the Ecuadorian elections of 2021 by accusing the left-wing candidate Andrés Arauz of being financed by the Colombian guerrilla group ELN. Despite his party supporting Donald Trump during the 2020 US presidential election, Duque maintained very good relations under the presidency of Joe Biden. The Biden administration showed signs of favoring right-wing candidates in the Colombian presidential election of 2022: senior US diplomats spoke to the press about alleged Russian, Cuban and Venezuelan interference in the election in favor of leftist candidate Gustavo Petro, while US officials avoided meeting Petro before the election while meeting other candidates. Duque condemned the 2022 Russian invasion of Ukraine and considered the invasion a violation of international law and the United Nations charter.

=== Criminal investigation ===
Following the publication of alleged evidence in March 2018 that Duque's political party conspired with the drug trafficking organization of Marquitos Figueroa to commit fraud in the presidential election, Congress's Accusations Committee and the National Electoral Council opened an investigation into his alleged role in the fraud. The Supreme Court opened a criminal investigation into his political sponsor, right-wing former President Álvaro Uribe, who is already being investigated for alleged witness fraud and bribery.

== Post–presidency (2022–present) ==
Two days after the end of his presidency, he was named a "distinguished fellow" at the influential Woodrow Wilson Center in Washington, D.C., a U.S. government-funded think tank with a monthly salary of $10,000.

He supported right wing candidate Javier Milei, who was elected, in the 2023 Argentine general election.

== Published books ==
Iván Duque is the author of the books Monetary Sins (2007), Machiavelli in Colombia (2010), Orange Effect (2015), IndignAcción (IndignAction) (2017), The Future is at the Center (2018) Archaeology of My Father (2018), Humanism Matters (2019), The Road to Zero (2021) and is co-author of the book The Orange Economy: An Infinite Opportunity (2013).

Duque has also been an Op-Ed contributor to several newspapers: El Colombiano, from Medellín; Portafolio and El Tiempo from Casa Editorial El Tiempo in Bogotá; and El País in Spain.

== Personal life ==
Duque is Roman Catholic. He is married to María Juliana Ruiz Sandoval, with whom he has three children: Luciana, Matías, and Eloísa.

== Awards ==
- 2022:
  - Woodrow Wilson Award for Global Public Service, by the Woodrow Wilson International Center for Scholars of the Smithsonian Institution.
  - Planetary Leadership Award, by the National Geographic Society.
- 2023:
  - Inaugural Cornell University Emerging Markets Institute Distinguished Fellow

== Honours ==
Coat of arms of Duque as Knight of the Collar of the Order of Isabella the Catholic.

=== National honours ===
- Grand Collar of the Order of Boyacá.
- Collar of the Order of San Carlos.
- Grand Cross Extraordinary of the National Order of Merit.
- Order of Merit Colonel Guillermo Fergusson.

=== Foreign honours ===
- Brazil
  - Grand Collar of the Order of the Southern Cross (2021).
- Dominican Republic
  - Grand Cross with Gold Breast Star, Order of Merit of Duarte, Sánchez and Mella (2022).
- Peru
  - Grand Collar of the Order of the Sun of Peru (2019).
  - Medal of Honor of the Congress of the Republic of Peru (2019).
- Portugal
  - Grand Collar of the Order of Prince Henry (2022).
- Spain
  - Collar of the Order of Isabella the Catholic (2021).
- South Korea
  - Grand Order of Mugunghwa (2021).

Party political offices
Preceded by Óscar Iván Zuluaga	Democratic Center nominee for President of Colombia; 2018	Succeeded by Óscar Iván Zuluaga (withdrew)
Political offices
Preceded by Juan Manuel Santos	President of Colombia; 2018–2022	Succeeded by Gustavo Petro
Order of precedence
Preceded by Juan Manuel Santos as former President	Order of precedence of Colombia former President	Succeeded by Gustavo Bell as former Vice President
Diplomatic posts
Preceded by Sebastián Piñera	President pro tempore of PROSUR; 2020–2022	Succeeded by Mario Abdo Benítez
