= 2019–2020 Colombian protests =

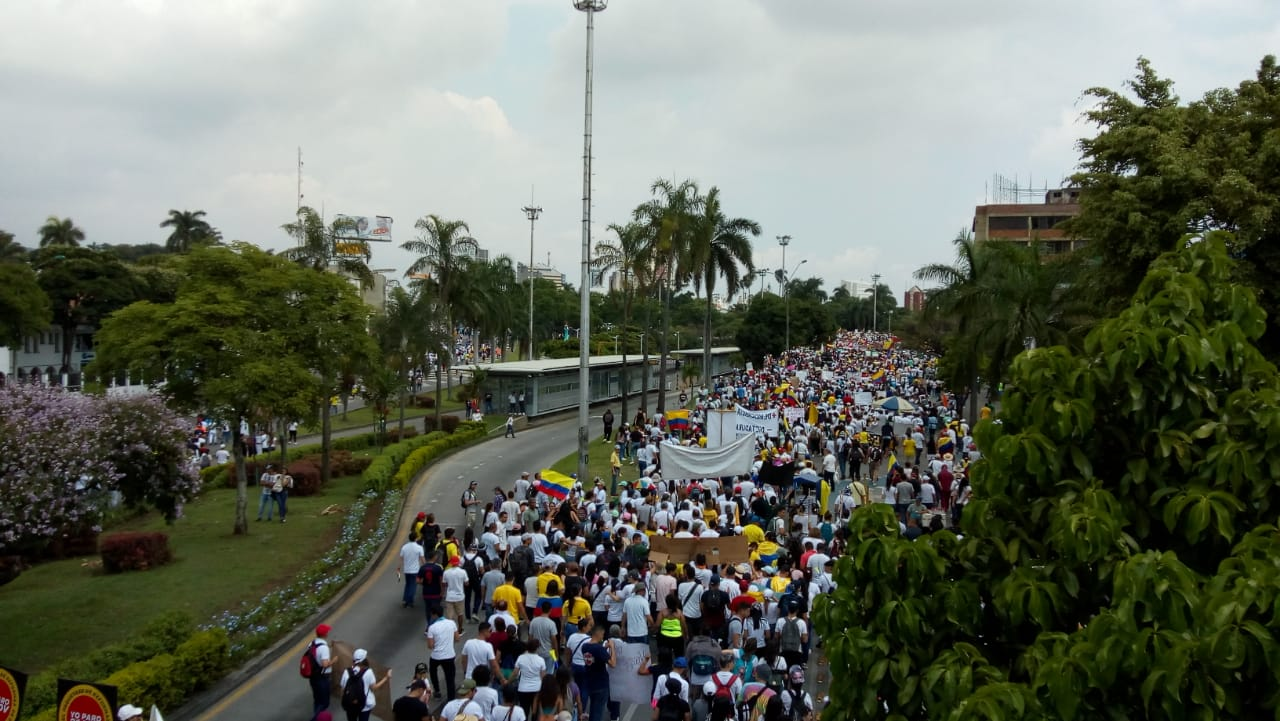
- Protest in Cali
- Date: 21 November 2019 – 21 February 2020
- Location: Colombia
- Caused by: Income inequality and rejection of austerity measures; Corruption and police brutality; President Iván Duque's opposition or ambivalence to the Colombian peace process and ongoing violence
- Goals: Better living conditions and rejection of proposed reforms

Parties
Government of Colombia; Military Forces of Colombia; National Army of Colombia; National Police of Colombia; Mobile Anti-Disturbance Squadron	Protesters

Lead figures
Iván Duque; Marta Lucía Ramírez; Carlos Holmes Trujillo	Gustavo Petro

Number
Hundreds of thousands of authorities	Hundreds of thousands to a million

Casualties
- Deaths: 17 (as of 15 September 2020)
- Injuries: 533 (as of 27 November 2019)
- Arrested: 500 (as of 27 November 2019)

The 2019–2020 Colombian protests were a collection of protests that began on 21 November 2019. Hundreds of thousands of Colombians demonstrated for various reasons. Some protested against income inequality, corruption, police brutality and various proposed economic and political reforms proposed by the government of Iván Duque Márquez, others against the few violent protestors and in favor of the Colombian peace process.

While mostly peaceful in nature, a few violent incidents took place throughout the protests, leading to overnight curfews in Cali and Bogotá. It is "one of the largest mass demonstrations Colombia has witnessed in recent years". The second phase of the protests, which started on 10 September 2020, were more violent and resulted in 17 deaths.

== Background ==
=== Corruption ===
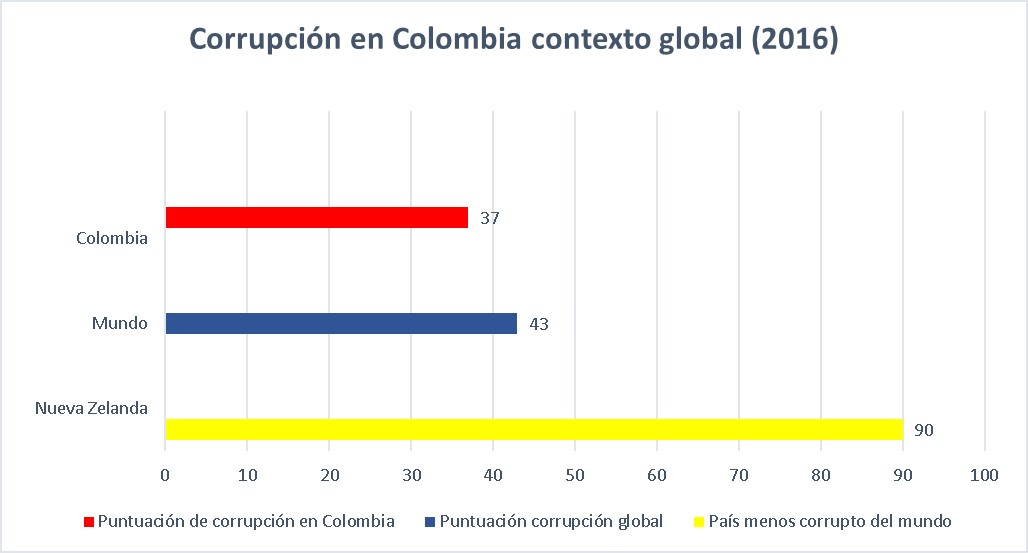
Comparison of corruption in Colombia with the world average and the least corrupt country worldwide, New Zealand

According to 2018 Corruption Perception Index data released by Transparency International to measure public sector corruption in 180 countries and territories, giving each a score from zero (highly corrupt) to 100 (very clean), Colombia scores 36 points. This is below the global average of 43 points, and makes Colombia the 99th most corrupt country in the world.

Protesters have expressed anger at corruption perception in the country.

=== Austerity measures ===
Rumors of possible austerity measures, denied by President Duque, angered left-wing groups, students and indigenous groups. The idea of such measures originated from the introduction of a bill by Álvaro Uribe, mentor of President Duque.

=== Peace process ===
Duque has been criticized strongly by human rights organizations for his opposition and ambivalence to the Colombian peace process with the Revolutionary Armed Forces of Colombia (FARC) as violence occurring in rural areas of Colombia resulted with the deaths of indigenous leaders. Also both FARC and the right-wing Colombian government have been accused repeatedly of human rights violations and of violating the peace treaty signed by both parties in Havana, Cuba in 2016.

=== Income inequality ===
Inequality in Colombia refers to the existing economic and social inequality in the country. According to World Bank figures, in 2017, Colombia was the second most unequal country in Latin America and the seventh in the world, out of the total of 194 countries that exist on the planet. Despite sustained economic growth of gross domestic product, which stood at 6.6% between 2006–2014, the inequality index did not drop enough during the peak of the oil boom.

As a means of demonstrating, labor unions organized a twelve-hour nationwide strike that was to be held on 21 November 2019, with other groups such as Indigenous leaders, students, and anti-corruption activists.

== Timeline ==
Time reports that the protesters in Colombia come from all backgrounds, and that they are protesting because of a general displeasure with government actions across a range of issues, triggered to action by rumors of pension cuts. These protests follow smaller student protests earlier in the year that failed to attract many supporters or attention, and have been inspired by the other protests across Latin America.

=== 2019 ===
==== 21 November ====
On 21 November, many Colombians, estimated between 200,000 and over 1 million, protested throughout the country, with the government responding by deploying 170,000 troops. The Colombian government also closed all of its borders.

Following similar demonstrations throughout Latin America, protesters displayed flags of Chile and Ecuador and banners reading "South America woke up", and chanted anti-violence slogans. Demonstrations turned violent, with clashes between police and protesters occurring later in the day and some groups attempting to storm Capitolio Nacional, the building that houses the Congress of Colombia. Fights broke out near the country's international airport, and tear gas was also fired at people at the National University of Bogotá.

During the protests on 21 November, 68 out of 138 TransMilenio stations were vandalized, 48 percent of the system infrastructure. The mayor of Cali imposed a curfew from 19:00 local time until 6:00 the next morning (UTC−5) as a response to violence. In the evening, a spontaneous cacerolazo happened in the capital and several other cities, after which senator Gustavo Petro encouraged more protests. On the first day of protests, three people were killed, with 98 arrested and 273 combined protesters and security forces injured.

==== 22 November ====
The following day, thousands of protesters gathered at Plaza Bolívar in the capital Bogotá, where they were later dispersed with tear gas. In response to the protests, President Duque said that he would open a "national conversation" after the weekend; the Defence Minister Carlos Holmes Trujillo said that 11 investigations into "alleged misconduct by members of the security forces" had begun.

Transportation in the capital was largely closed, and road blockades had been built in some areas. Many protests were peaceful, while some instances of looting and the theft of a public bus occurred in the capital city, where a curfew was enforced in the evening. Some protesters ignored the curfew, with others protesting outside of Duque's house through the night. In Santander de Quilichao in the southwest of the country, three police officers were killed, and ten more injured, by a car bomb.

After the initial anti-austerity and anti-corruption protests had begun, other groups joined in demonstrations, including environmental action groups, animal rights groups, and women's rights groups. The lootings happening in poorer areas have contributed to an increase in anti-Venezuelan sentiment, with some suspecting Venezuelan migrants to part of the perpetrators.

==== 23 November ====
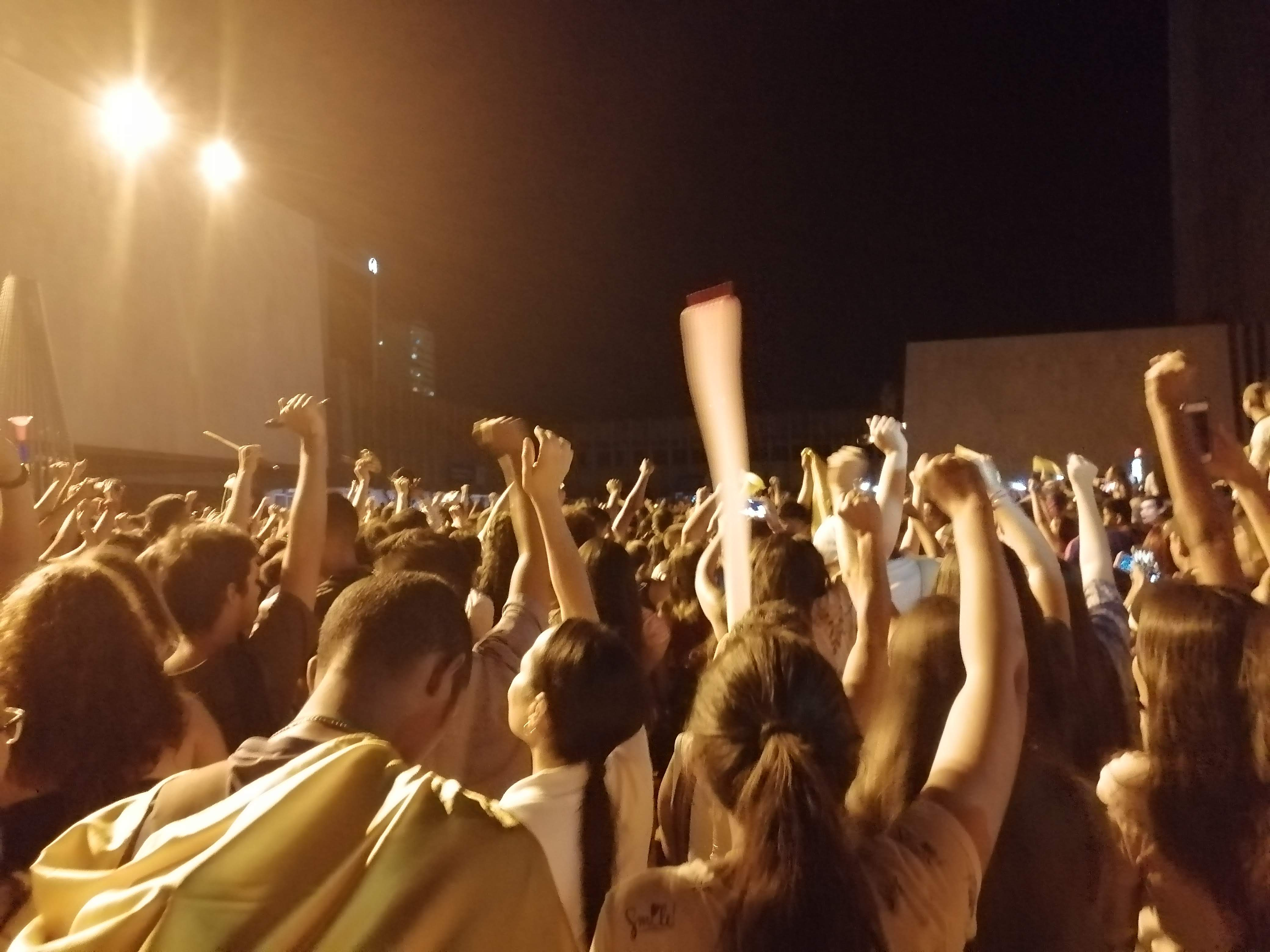
Protest on 23 November

Going into the morning of 23 November, Duque said that he would not recall troops that had been patrolling in the streets, and that the measure was to maintain order. After the previous night's curfew, protesters returned to the streets, with hundreds in the capital's National Park being dispersed with tear gas, and to Plaza Bolívar and the Capitol building. When looting happened through protests and rioting, the government referred to the actions as an "orchestrated terror campaign".

One protester was critically wounded on Saturday after being hit in the head by a tear gas canister, prompting other protesters to hold a vigil. His name was Dilan Cruz, a teenager. The protester died two days later.

==== December ====
On 1 December, the so-called Continental Cacerolazo was held, in Bogotá the Andean cacerolazo was held in Park Way and popular assemblies began in neighborhoods of Bogotá. A week later the so-called "Concert of the Strike" or "A Song for Colombia" was held in Bogotá on 8 December at the Simón Bolívar Park with artists such as Doctor Krapula, Bomba Estéreo, Adriana Lucía, Diamante Eléctrico, Totó la Momposina, among others. On 10 December, mobilizations were held for International Human Rights Day, 82 holding sit-ins in front of the National University of Colombia and the National Center for Historical Memory, ending in Disturbances. On the other hand, ESMAD made two illegal arrests. On 16 December, a cacerolazo was held in front of the Congress of the Republic when the tax reform or "Economic Growth Law" was debated in rejection of it. In Cali there were riots in the Juanchito sector. Three days later, a demonstration was held in the north of the country's capital, riots broke out in front of the Colombian Stock Exchange and a young man loses an eye when fleeing to the National Pedagogical University.

=== 2020 ===
On 13 January, meetings were held between the national government and the union, student and social organizations promoting the National Strike, without results. On 21 January, the National Strike Committee calls for a new pot and a national strike day. In the morning hours, in the main cities there were several blockades in the streets and thousands of people again expressed their discontent against the government of Iván Duque, there were some clashes with ESMAD and the public force, in turn, in Social networks reported abuses by the authorities. In Bogotá, Mayor Claudia López highlights the new protocol for protests declaring that "there were no deaths to regret".

On 21 February 2020, there were marches by teachers and university students, most of which take place normally, except for a disturbance that occurred in the vicinity of the Francisco José de Caldas District University.

=== Responses to the protests ===
==== Favorable support of protest ====
the newly elected mayor of Bogotá, Claudia López Hernández, spoke in favor and encouraged the citizens of Bogotá not to fear protesting in peace. Various sectors between public and private workers, very important university professors, students from public universities and some from private universities, popular soccer clubs like Millonarios F.C. and Santa Fe and groups from the political left confirmed their participation. Some personalities such as the singers Carlos Vives, Santiago Cruz and Adriana Lucía, the Miss Colombia 2019 María Fernanda Aristizábal, the senator Gustavo Petro, the member of ChocQuibTown Goyo and the actors Julián Román, Robinson Díaz, Juan Pablo Raba and Santiago Alarcón, in addition to the actresses Carolina Guerra, Cecilia Navia, Maria Fernanda Matus, and Margarita Rosa de Francisco, the journalist Daniel Samper Ospina, the humorist Alejandro Riaño, the soccer players Natalia Galán, Leicy Santos and Melissa Ortíz, as well as the Tour de France champion cyclist Egan Bernal and many others, also joined the movement.

==== International responses ====
The United Nations and Human Rights Watch (HRW) have demanded that the Office of the Attorney General of the Nation carry out an in-depth investigation to clarify responsibilities. "There should be no impunity," said the UN. Miguel Vivanco, HRW director for the Americas, has also addressed the new Defense Minister, Carlos Holmes Trujillo, to announce "measures to prevent this from happening again." The International Trade Union Confederation (ITUC) and important British unionsexpressed their support for the National Strike in Colombia, as did the International Transport Federation (ITF) .155 Likewise, the Latin American Council of Social Sciences (CLACSO) expressed its support for the protests The Portuguese sociologist Boaventura de Sousa Santos sent an open letter to President Iván Duque to attend to the demands of the strike. The resident singers and Nicky Jam expressed their messages of support for the National Strike, as well as the Uruguayan footballer Nicolás Vikonis, who played between 2011 and 2017 in Colombia, Claudio Narea and Miguel Tapia, former members of the Chilean rock band Los Prisioneros, also expressed their support for the strike and the concert "Un canto por Colombia".

== See also ==
- Javier Ordóñez protests
- 2021 Colombian protests
- 2020s in political history
- List of protests in the 21st century
