= Mobile Anti-Disturbance Squadron =

Unit of the National Police of Colombia

Mobile Anti-Disturbance Squadron Escuadrón Móvil Antidisturbios
- Abbreviation: ESMAD

Agency overview
- Employees: 3,800

Jurisdictional structure
- National agency: Colombia
- Operations jurisdiction: Colombia

Operational structure
- Parent agency: National Police of Colombia

Website
- www.policia.gov.co/especializados/antidisturbios

Mobile Anti-Disturbances Squadron or Escuadrón Móvil Antidisturbios (ESMAD) in Spanish is a Colombian National Police riot control unit specialized on preventing and/or controlling public disturbances and riots, as well controlling vandalism in cities. This unit is under the command of the Operative Directorate of the Colombian National Police.

== History ==
The Escuadrón Móvil Antidisturbios (ESMAD) was born as a decentralized unit from the Colombian National Police on February 24, 1999, by a transitional directorate, beginning with 9 officers, 8 non-commissioned officers and 200 patrollers mainly to support Colombian Departments and Metropolitan police forces to control and/or neutralize population disturbances or public events when their forces seem outnumbered or incapable to handle their action capacity. It was later legalized by resolution 01363 of April 14, 1999.

APC used by the ESMAD in a protest against George W. Bush's visit to Bogotá.

The unit is said to be trained on human rights issues however in 2006, it was largely criticized and questioned for some of its actions during the National University of Colombia riots. This riot police unit was also questioned by the Office of the United Nations High Commissioner for Human Rights after the death of six protesters. Nonetheless, the Colombian government continues to invest money in this unit. Senator Wilson Arias denounced the investment of around 8,000 million pesos. In the midst of the COVID-19 health emergency, the Colombian government prefers to invest in a force that has injured more than 800 people and from which 43 victims have been confirmed before 2021.

== Regional Operational Divisions ==
There are seven active mobile squadrons operating in Colombia:

- Bogotá: Mobile Group I, Mobile Group II, Mobile Group III
- Medellín: Mobile Group IV
- Cali: Mobile Group V
- Barranquilla: Mobile Group VI
- Bucaramanga: Mobile Group VII

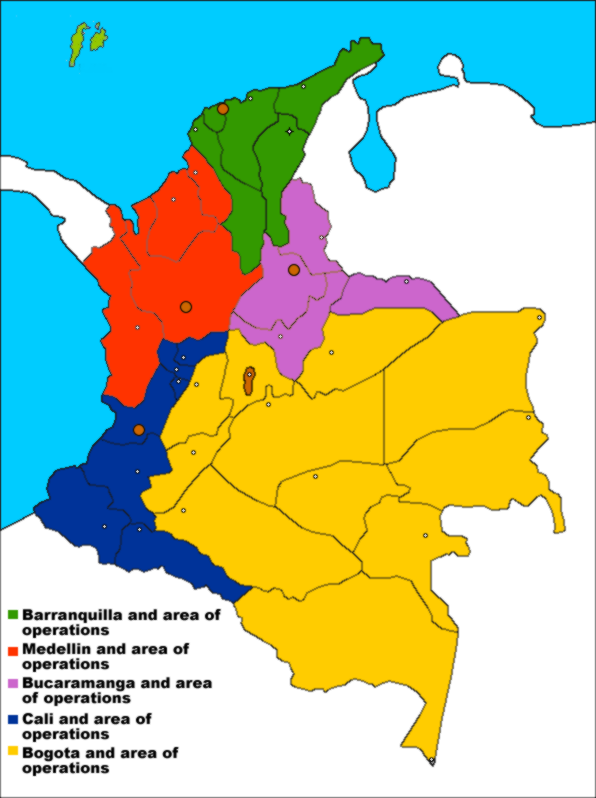
ESMAD operational areas within Colombia.
