= Political impact of the COVID-19 pandemic =

Impact of COVID-19 on political systems

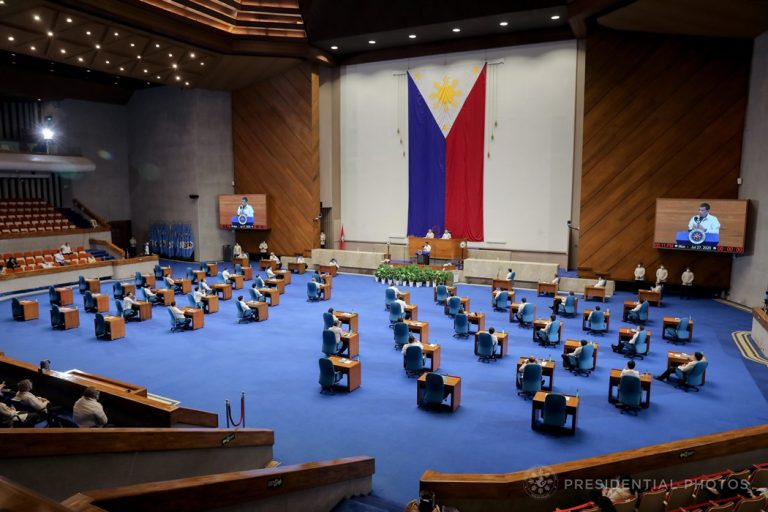
Social distancing measures employed at President Rodrigo Duterte's 2020 State of the Nation Address during the COVID-19 pandemic in the Philippines

The COVID-19 pandemic has influenced politics around the world; it affected the governing and political systems of multiple countries, reflected in states of emergency, suspensions of legislative activities, isolation or deaths of multiple politicians and reschedulings of elections due to fears of spreading the virus. The pandemic has triggered broader debates about political issues such as the relative advantages of democracy and autocracy, how states respond to crises, politicization of beliefs about the virus, and the adequacy of existing frameworks of international cooperation. Additionally, the pandemic has, in some cases, posed several challenges to democracy, leading to it being undermined and damaged.

== General impacts ==
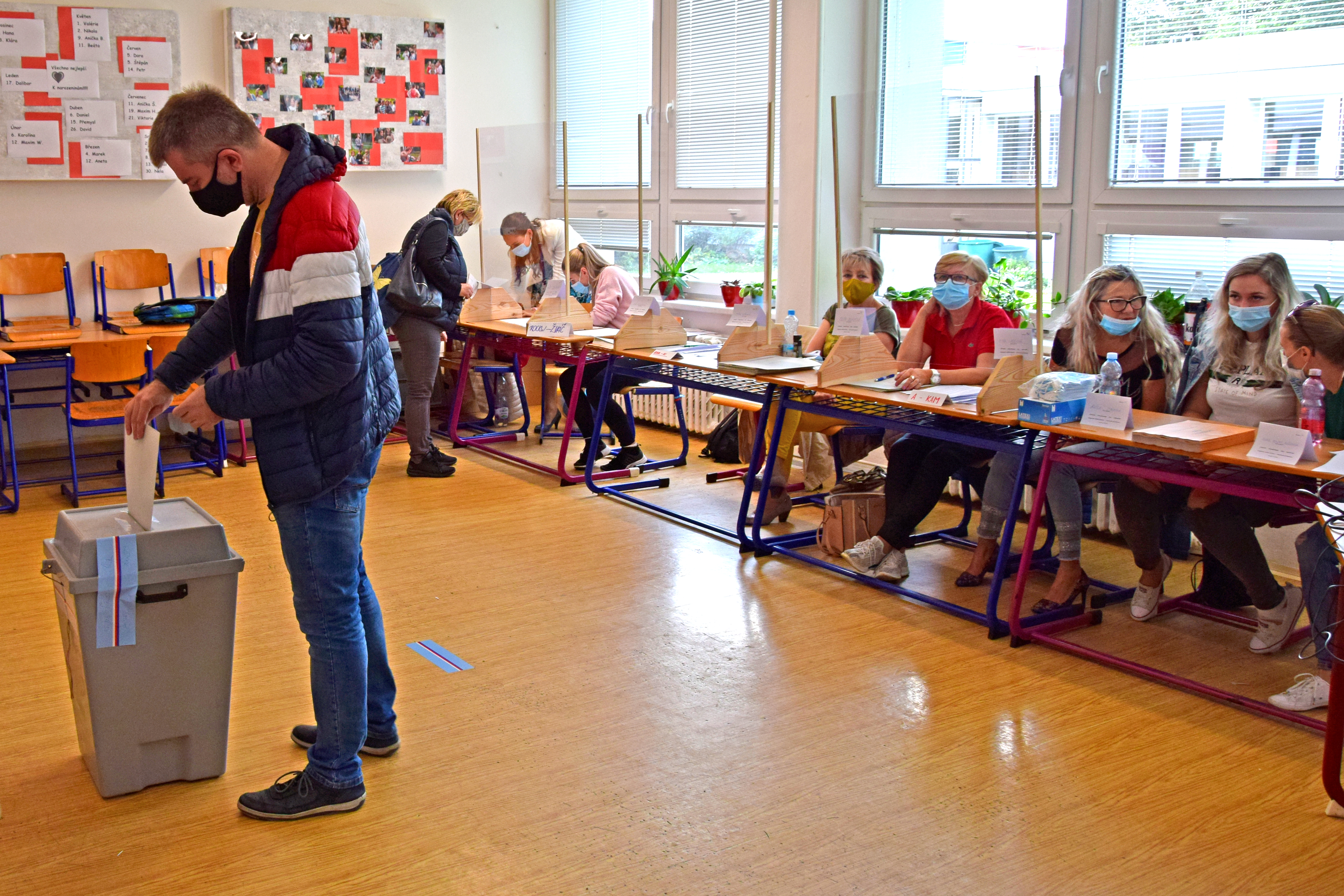
Anti-pandemic precautions during the 2020 Czech regional elections

=== Leader popularity ===
There is evidence that the pandemic had initially caused a rally 'round the flag effect in many countries, with government approval ratings rising in Italy (+27 percentage points), Germany (+11), France (+11), and the United Kingdom between April and July 2020. This short-term increase has become less pronounced over time, with approval ratings changing often due to how each country has handled the pandemic; the United Kingdom, for example, saw a drop from an approval rating of 51% in March 2020 to 41% in July 2021, while France saw an increase from 27% to 35% in the same time-frame.

In the United States, President Donald Trump saw a 6-point drop in approval, while state governors have seen increases as high as 55 points for New York Governor Andrew Cuomo, 31 points for North Carolina Governor Roy Cooper, and 30 points for Michigan Governor Gretchen Whitmer. A review of polling before and one month into the pandemic suggests that incumbent governments around the world gained on average 4.7% on polls of voting-intention as the rally-round-the-flag effect kicked in, with governments who went to re-election during the pandemic mostly maintaining said improvement up until their election.

In Israel, the virus begun to rapidly spread after the March 2020 election. The incumbent PM Benjamin Netanyahu did not win enough seats to form a coalition, and the presidential mandate to form a coalition was given to his contender, Benny Gantz. However, Netanyahu's pandemic politics brought his party the Likud to reach peak public support (41-43 seats during the first wave of April–May 2020), pushing Gantz to ask Israel's president to transfer the mandate to Netanyahu so that the latter could form, and head, a new government.

=== States of emergency ===
At least 84 countries declared a state of emergency in response to the pandemic, which led to fears about misuse of power. Reporters Without Borders has claimed that 38 countries have restricted freedom of the press as a result. Other examples include banning mass protests, postponing elections or holding them while the opposition cannot effectively campaign, selectively enforcing lockdown rules on political opponents, handing out relief payments to political supporters, or scapegoating minorities. Many countries have also unveiled large-scale surveillance programs for contact tracing, leading to worries about effects on privacy.

=== Human rights and freedoms ===
Whilst the emergency powers enacted by governments in order to stem the spread of the pandemic were made in the interests of protecting public health and minimizing risk to countries' economies and crucial services such as health care, they have inadvertently led to concerns over human rights and civil liberties. The government response seen in the Philippines led to accusations of government forces violently detaining, attacking, and even killing citizens who flouted public health restriction laws. Violent clashes between citizens and armed government authorities have also been seen in countries including Greece, the United States, and Germany.

Human rights and civil liberties have also been threatened through digital surveillance technology by multiple governments, leading to concerns over human rights to privacy, freedom, expression and association. The Ecuadorean government introduced a new GPS tracking system without associated data handling legislation, leaving users' details exposed and insecure. In South Korea, health authorities launched a track and trace app which asked users to disclose personal information, leading to concerns over both privacy and the potential for discrimination. Furthermore, the right to freedom of movement has been curtailed by many national governments during the pandemic, with 186 countries enacting border restrictions in response to the pandemic.

In relation, the ongoing discrimination faced by minorities, in particular, has also been a root cause in the socio-economic factors which has affected the freedoms and rights of the most vulnerable populations.

=== Democracy ===
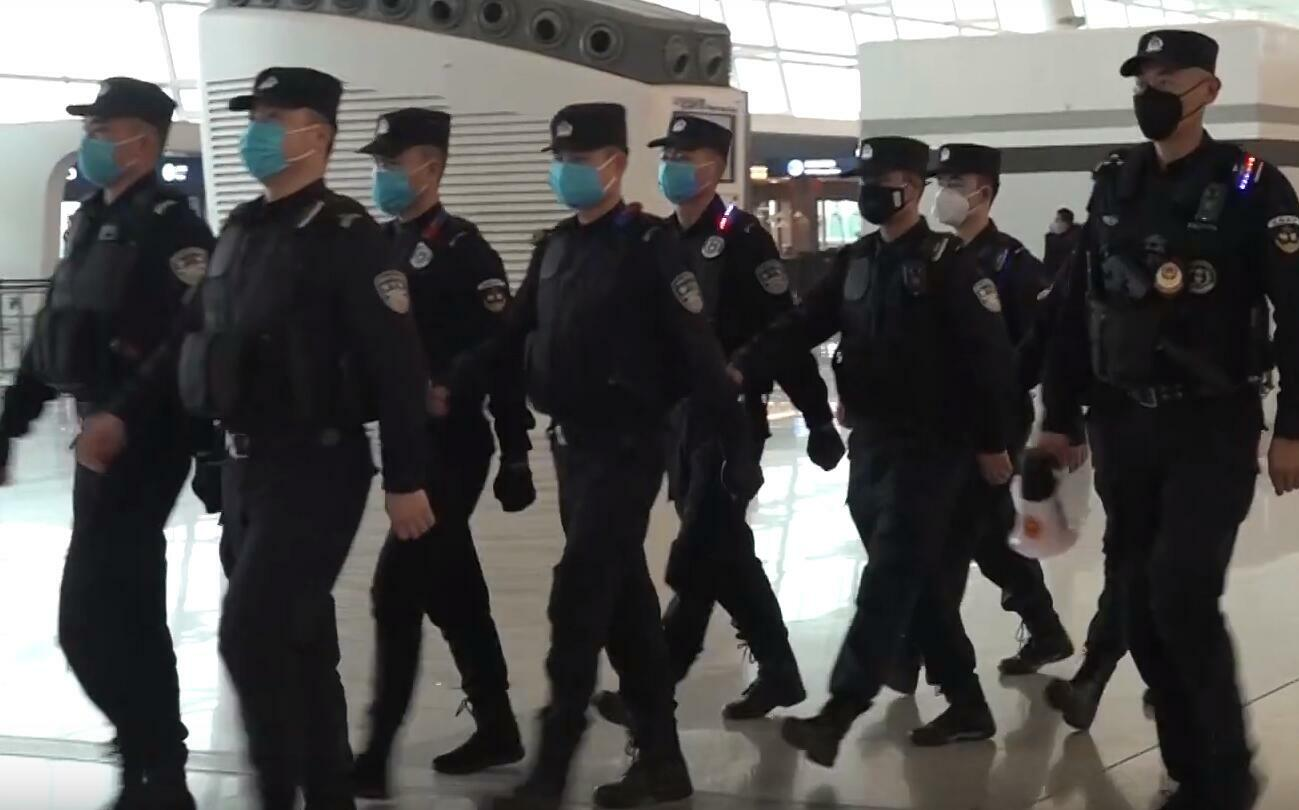
Police wearing masks in the Wuhan Tianhe International Airport during the initial COVID-19 outbreak, January 2020

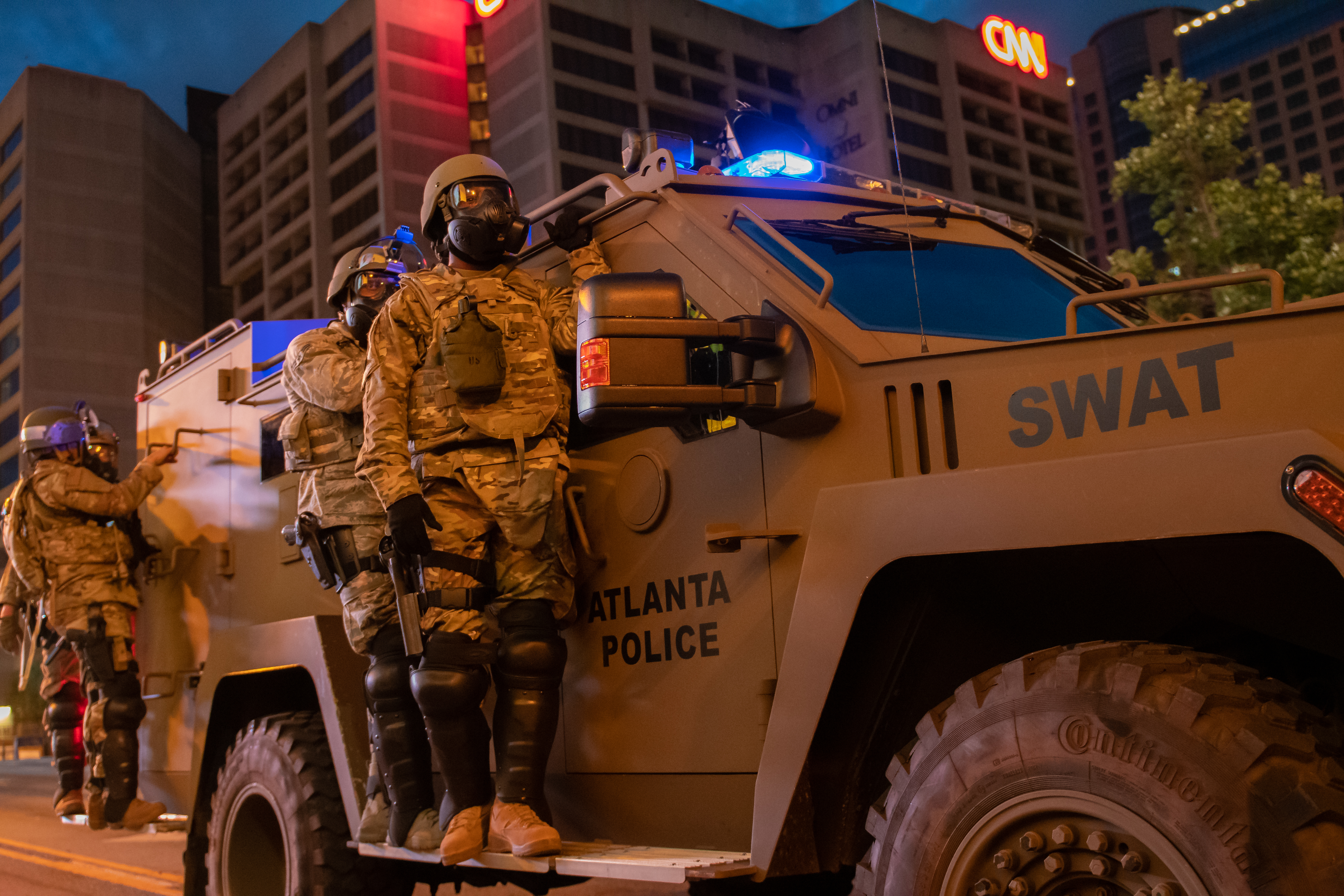
U.S. National Guard soldiers assist SWAT team members enforcing a lockdown curfew during the George Floyd protests in Atlanta, June 2020

The COVID-19 pandemic was used as a pretext for autocratization, largely due to the heavy practical and logistical disruption the virus and subsequent lockdown restrictions have caused. Across the world, national governments found themselves with no other choice but to suspend, cancel, or postpone numerous democratic elections at both national and subnational governmental levels.

The 2020 Freedom House report also highlighted a variety of responses relating to government mishandling of the pandemic against the best interests of its citizens, such as denial of the existence of COVID-19 in Turkmenistan and Nicaragua, and the promotion of unsafe or unproven treatments in Brazil and Tanzania. The Freedom in the World score dropped by 45 points in 2020, marking the most significant decline in the prior fifteen years. According to Ingo Keilitz, both authoritarian leaders and surveillance capitalists used the pandemic to "make massive shifts and reprogramming of our sensibilities about privacy and civil liberties that may not be reversible." Keilitz saw this as a threat to judicial independence. The Pandemic Backsliding Index created by V-Dem measured authoritarian and illiberal practices between March and December 2020 for 144 countries, and found 80% of all countries engaged in authoritarian practices such as emergency measures without time limit, disproportionate limitations on the role of legislatures, and government disinformation campaigns. Dr. Abouzzohour at Harvard University said that from 2020 to 2022, COVID-19 "undoubtedly contributed to the deterioration of political freedom" globally. She claimed "heightened repression, militarization, and restrictions" following from the pandemic contributed.

This is due to factors that have been weakened such as "checks against abuses of power, protection of vulnerable groups, transparency and anti-corruption, free media and expression, and credible elections." As governments were entrusted with unprecedented powers to protect public health, even the strongest democracies "failed to guard themselves against abuse of power," said an op-ed on Newsweek. This is because emergency powers grant governments the ability to '"make regulations without an act of parliament" These powers are typically intended to take "rapid action" and combat instability. Emergency powers have been used by some governments to extend state power. This arguably occurred in Moscow, where tens of thousands of cameras with facial-recognition features were supposedly installed to track contagion, however, these systems risk remaining in place after the pandemic. According to a 2020 Brookings Institution report, "the challenges posed by the need for mass surveillance suggest that the resilience of democratic regimes cannot be taken for granted." The same study highlighted foreign disinformation surrounding COVID-19 as a threat to democracy, stating that the pandemic presented an opportunity for malign actors to "multiply the production of fake news, conspiracy theories, and manipulated information", it further stated that "Russia and China exploited the chaos induced by COVID-19 to promote their geopolitical interests and continue to destabilise western democracies."

An article on the journal Democratic Theory comments that a side effect of COVID-19 will be a "long-term effect on established democracies around the world." Part of this long-term effect includes the increasing prevalence of democratic backsliding; while proportional responses to a global pandemic are necessary, excessive measures under abusive enforcement have raised concerns that democracy, in nations where it is already unstable, is declining worldwide.

After the National Assembly of Hungary passed legislation allowing Viktor Orbán to rule by decree, the Washington Post declared the pandemic had "killed its first democracy." During the Hong Kong protests in 2020, police used newly-passed pandemic laws banning groups of more than four to disperse protesters.

=== Media freedom ===
Media freedom, in its many forms, has also been greatly impacted during the COVID-19 pandemic. Multiple governments introduced restrictions on websites to prevent reportage on the spread of misinformation and hide poor representations of themselves.

The Chinese government attempted to control the global narrative on their initial unwillingness and inability to contain the initial outbreak by censoring millions of pieces of content containing over 2,000 keywords related to the pandemic on the leading communication platform WeChat and the live-streaming platform YY. In addition, nations such as Bangladesh and Egypt have blocked international news outlets from their respective Internet systems under the guise of spreading false information. This removal of the ability of media outlets to criticise governments represented a breach of freedom of expression under Article 19 of the UDHR. These restrictions allowed media outlets and journalists to be prosecuted and imprisoned more easily, often unfairly and arbitrarily.

=== Political discourse ===
Abulof, Le Penne and Pu analyzed public discourse through the NOW (News on the Web) corpus and Google Trends. Their findings indicate that 2020 saw a dramatic rise in thinking about 'death' and 'mortality,' worldwide. They also found that the words most associated with this morbidity since 2004 are 'Covid' and 'coronavirus,' and that similar trends appear in other languages. They argue that the rise is due to both the pandemic itself and pandemic politics – politicians fostering, using, and abusing, existential anxiety on a mass scale.

In another discourse analysis, speeches about the pandemic delivered by Donald Trump and Jair Bolsonaro show ideological polarization to be the most frequent strategy, suggesting that political discourse can be a potential source of societal manipulation. A study on speeches made by 20 heads of government around the world during the pandemic shows that women spoke more frequently about the pandemic's impact on the individual, while men underscored war metaphors to describe COVID-19 and their response.

== Impact on international relations ==
=== European Union ===
The Spanish Prime Minister Pedro Sánchez stated that "If we don't propose now a unified, powerful and effective response to this economic crisis, not only the impact will be tougher, but its effects will last longer and we will be putting at risk the entire European project", while the Italian Prime Minister Giuseppe Conte commented that "the whole European project risks losing its raison d'être in the eyes of our own citizens". From 4 to 19 March, Germany banned the export of personal protective equipment, and France also restricted exports of medical equipment, drawing criticism from EU officials who called for solidarity. Many Schengen Area countries closed their borders to stem the spread of the virus.

==== Jointly issued debt ====
Debates over how to respond to the epidemic and its economic fallout have opened up a rift between Northern and Southern European member states, reminiscent of debates over the 2010s European debt crisis. Nine EU countries—Italy, France, Belgium, Greece, Portugal, Spain, Ireland, Slovenia and Luxembourg—called for "corona bonds" (a type of eurobond) in order to help their countries to recover from the epidemic, on 25 March. Their letter stated, "The case for such a common instrument is strong, since we are all facing a symmetric external shock." Northern European countries such as Germany, Austria, Finland, and the Netherlands oppose the issuing of joint debt, fearing that they would have to pay it back in the event of a default. Instead, they propose that countries should apply for loans from the European Stability Mechanism. Corona bonds were discussed on 26 March 2020 in a European Council meeting, which dragged out for three hours longer than expected due to the "emotional" reactions of the prime ministers of Spain and Italy. European Council President Charles Michel and European Central Bank head Christine Lagarde have urged the EU to consider issuing joint debt. Unlike the European debt crisis—partly caused by the affected countries—southern European countries did not cause the coronavirus pandemic, therefore eliminating the appeal to national responsibility.

==== Civil liberties ====
Many countries resorted to states of emergency, curtailing civil liberties and awarding executives wider powers. Sixteen member nations of the European Union issued a statement warning that certain emergency measures issued by countries during the coronavirus pandemic could undermine the principles of rule of law and democracy on 1 April. They announced that they "support the European Commission initiative to monitor the emergency measures and their application to ensure the fundamental values of the Union are upheld." The statement does not mention Hungary, but observers believe that it implicitly refers to a Hungarian law granting plenary power to the Hungarian Government during the coronavirus pandemic. The following day, the Hungarian Government joined the statement.

The Hungarian parliament passed the law granting plenary power to the Government by qualified majority, 137 to 53 votes in favor, on 30 March 2020. After promulgating the law, the President of Hungary, János Áder, announced that he had concluded that the time frame of the Government's authorization would be definite and its scope would be limited. Ursula von der Leyen, the President of the European Commission, stated that she was concerned about the Hungarian emergency measures and that it should be limited to what is necessary and Minister of State Michael Roth suggested that economic sanctions should be used against Hungary.

The heads of thirteen member parties of the European People's Party (EPP) made a proposal to expunge the Hungarian Fidesz for the new legislation on 2 April. In response, Viktor Orbán expressed his willingness to discuss any issues relating to Fidesz's membership "once the pandemic is over" in a letter addressed to the Secretary General of EPP Antonio López-Istúriz White. Referring to the thirteen leading politicians' proposal, Orbán also stated that "I can hardly imagine that any of us having time for fantasies about the intentions of other countries. This seems to be a costly luxury these days." During a video conference of the foreign ministers of the European Union member states on 3 April 2020, Hungarian Minister of Foreign Affairs, Péter Szijjártó, asked for the other ministers to read the legislation itself not its politically motivated presentations in newspapers before commenting on it.

==== Brexit ====
The pandemic had an impact on the United Kingdom's departure from the European Union, with border checks on EU imports initially delayed until July 2021 and then delayed again to 2022 in an attempt to mitigate supply issues caused by the pandemic. The European Commission–AstraZeneca COVID-19 vaccine dispute also led to a dispute over the Northern Ireland Protocol. Some analysts have suggested that the economic impact of the COVID-19 pandemic in the United Kingdom has masked the impacts of Brexit on the UK.

==== Moldova-Romania collaboration ====
During the COVID-19 pandemic, Romania has supported Moldova on several occasions, supplying it with medical equipment and supplies, volunteer Romanian experts and doctors and even a series of COVID-19 vaccine units that arrived on 27 February 2021, which allowed Moldova to start its vaccination program.

=== Japan–South Korea relations ===
Japan–South Korea relations worsened as a result of the pandemic. After Japan declared it would start quarantining all arrivals from South Korea, the South Korean government described the move as "unreasonable, excessive and extremely regrettable", and that it couldn't "help but question whether Japan has other motives than containing the outbreak". Some South Korean media have offered opinions to improve relations with Japan through mask assistance to Japan. In addition, some local governments in Japan who did not disclose their names have also announced their intention to purchase masks in Korea. When this fact became known, some online commentators in Japan expressed that they were against receiving mask donations from Korea, worrying that it would not be a purely goodwill donation but tied to Japanese government concessions on controversial topics such as the contested Liancourt Rocks and World War II comfort women sexual slavery. Although local Korean media suggested that masks could be donated via Japan's sizable Korean-Japanese population, the Korean government noted, in the spring of 2020, that it was not considering support toward Japan at that time. On the contrary, inside Japan, an editorial was published stating that the Korean government should donate medical supplies, such as face masks, covertly and that the Japanese government should accept such donations.

=== China ===
The United States has criticised the Chinese government for its handling of the pandemic, which began in the Chinese province of Hubei. In Brazil, the Congressman Eduardo Bolsonaro, son of President Jair Bolsonaro, caused a diplomatic dispute with China when he retweeted a message saying: "The blame for the global coronavirus pandemic has a name and surname: the Chinese Communist party." Yang Wanming, China's top diplomat in Brazil, retweeted a message that said: "The Bolsonaro family is the great poison of this country."

Some commentators believe the state propaganda in China is promoting a narrative that China's authoritarian system is uniquely capable of curbing the coronavirus and contrasts that with the chaotic response of the Western democracies. European Union foreign policy chief Josep Borrell said that "China is aggressively pushing the message that, unlike the US, it is a responsible and reliable partner."

The Chinese Ministry of Foreign Affairs has claimed that the United States military is behind the virus. When Australia suggested an inquiry to better understand the origin of the pandemic and to undermine the World Health Organization, the Chinese ambassador threatened with economic retaliation. The Chinese embassy to France has in turn claimed that French nursing homes were "abandoning their posts overnight ... and leaving their residents to die of hunger and disease". The Chinese government has also tried to directly influence statements of other governments in order to show the country in a more positive light, including in Germany, and Wisconsin.

China has sent aid to 82 countries, the World Health Organization, and the African Union, which is considered by some western media as to "counter its negative image in the early stage of the pandemic". According to Yangyang Cheng, a postdoctoral research associate at Cornell University, "The Chinese government has been trying to project Chinese state power beyond its borders and establish China as a global leader, not dissimilar to what the U.S. government has been doing for the better part of a century, and the distribution of medical aid is part of this mission." Borrell warned that there is "a geo-political component including a struggle for influence through spinning and the 'politics of generosity'."

Trade in medical supplies between the United States and China has also become politically complicated. Exports of face masks and other medical equipment to China from the United States (and many other countries) spiked in February, according to statistics from Trade Data Monitor, prompting criticism from the Washington Post that the United States government failed to anticipate the domestic needs for that equipment. Similarly, The Wall Street Journal, citing Trade Data Monitor to show that China is the leading source of many key medical supplies, raised concerns that US tariffs on imports from China threaten imports of medical supplies into the United States.

=== United States in 2020 ===
In early March, European Union leaders condemned the United States' decision to restrict travel from Europe to the United States.

The U.S. came under scrutiny by officials from other countries for allegedly hijacking shipments of crucial supplies meant for other countries.

Jean Rottner, the President of France's Regional council of Grand Est, accused the United States of disrupting face mask deliveries by buying at the last minute. French officials stated that Americans came to the airport tarmac and offered several times the French payment as the shipment was prepared for departure to France. Justin Trudeau, the Prime Minister of Canada, asked Bill Blair, the Public Safety Minister, and Marc Garneau, the Transportation Minister, to investigate allegations that medical supplies originally intended for Canada were diverted to the United States. German politician Andreas Geisel accused the United States of committing "modern piracy" after reports that 200,000 N95 masks meant for German police were diverted during an en-route transfer between airplanes in Thailand to the United States, but later changed his statement after he clarified that the mask orders were made through a German firm, not a U.S. firm as earlier stated, and the supply chain issues were under review.

Due to shortages in coronavirus tests, Maryland Governor Larry Hogan had his wife Yumi Hogan, who was born in South Korea, speak with the South Korean ambassador and afterwards multiple South Korean companies stated that they would send tests to Maryland.

On 2 April 2020, President Trump invoked the Defense Production Act of 1950 to halt exports of masks produced by 3M to Canada and Latin America. Canadian Prime Minister Justin Trudeau said that it would be a mistake for both their countries to limit trade of essential goods or services, including medical supplies and professionals, and remarked that this moves in both directions. The Canadian government turned to China and other places for crucial medical supplies, while they sought a constructive discussion about the issue with the Trump administration.

As of 30 December 2020, two federal politicians, eight state politicians, and five local politicians have died from COVID-19.

The pandemic has been cited as one of the primary reasons for Trump's defeat in the 2020 U.S. Presidential Election. This is due to the political turmoil in the United States caused by pitting Republicans against Democrats over policy and procedure. The difference in views on the pandemic ultimately led to dissatisfaction with federal response.

Trump's successor, Joe Biden, claimed that his Administration's "number one priority" is to mitigate the effects of the pandemic, which led to the passing of the American Rescue Plan stimulus package.

According to a report by Reuters, the United States ran a propaganda campaign to spread disinformation about the Sinovac Chinese COVID-19 vaccine, including using fake social media accounts saying that the Sinovac vaccine contained pork-derived ingredients and was therefore haram under Islamic law. The campaign primarily targeted people in the Philippines and used a social media hashtag for "China is the virus" in Tagalog. The campaign, which ran from 2020 to 2021, was overseen by Special Operations Command Pacific General Jonathan P. Braga. According to Reuters, Braga and other military officials who favored the campaign justified the program as a response to China's vaccine diplomacy and COVID-19 disinformation by China directed against the U.S. Reuters wrote that United States was concerned that "China's offers of assistance were tilting the geopolitical playing field across the developing world, including in the Philippines." However some American public health experts, after being briefed by Reuters on the Pentagon's covert anti-vax campaign, had condemned it as unjustifiable, and that it had unethically endangered innocent lives for potential geopolitical gain.

=== World Health Organization ===
The head of the World Health Organization, Tedros Adhanom, claimed that he had been "severely discriminated against", and had received death threats and racist insults, claiming that "This attack came from Taiwan". The foreign ministry of Taiwan protested this accusation, indicating "strong dissatisfaction and a high degree of regret" and that the Taiwanese people "condemn all forms of discrimination and injustice".

On 7 April 2020, United States President Donald Trump threatened to cut funding to the WHO. On 7 July 2020, the Trump administration announced that the United States would formally withdraw from the WHO. On 22 January 2021, president Joe Biden re-admitted the United States to the World Health Organization.

=== Organisation for Economic Co-operation and Development ===
The OECD Secretary-General Angel Gurría wrote that "This is the third and greatest economic, financial and social shock of the 21st century, and it demands a modern, global effort akin to the last century's Marshall Plan and New Deal – combined." COVID-19 has a strong regional and global impact, calling for differentiated governance and policy responses from local to international levels. A coordinated response by all levels of government can minimize crisis-management failures.

=== International Court of Justice ===
The International Court of Justice (ICJ) planned to discuss the Guyana–Venezuela territorial dispute in March 2020. The ICJ also delayed public hearings over maritime border disputes between Somalia and Kenya until March 2021. Both hearings were postponed due to the pandemic.

=== Global ceasefire ===
The coronavirus pandemic appears to have worsened conflict dynamics; it has also led to a United Nations Security Council resolution demanding a global ceasefire. On 23 March 2020, United Nations Secretary-General António Guterres issued an appeal for a global ceasefire as part of the United Nations' response to the COVID-19 pandemic. On 24 June 2020, 170 UN Member States and Observers signed a non-binding statement in support of the appeal, rising to 172 on 25 June 2020. On 1 July 2020, the UN Security Council passed resolution S/RES/2532 (2020), demanding a "general and immediate cessation of hostilities in all situations on its agenda," expressing support for "the efforts undertaken by the Secretary-General and his Special Representatives and Special Envoys in that respect," calling for "all parties to armed conflicts to engage immediately in a durable humanitarian pause" of at least 90 consecutive days, and calling for greater international cooperation to address the pandemic.

=== NATO ===
The planned NATO "Defender 2020" military exercises in Germany, Poland and the Baltic states was held on a reduced scale. The Morning Star reported that Campaign for Nuclear Disarmament's general secretary Kate Hudson criticised the holding of the exercise during the pandemic, saying "it jeopardises the lives not only of the troops from the U.S. and the many European countries participating but the inhabitants of the countries in which they are operating."

Defender-Europe 21, one of the largest U.S. Army, NATO-led military exercises in Europe in decades, began in mid-March 2021 and lasted until June 2021. It included "nearly simultaneous operations across more than 30 training areas" in Estonia, Bulgaria, Romania, Kosovo and other countries.

=== Vaccine diplomacy ===
After deployment of COVID-19 vaccines began in December 2020, vaccine diplomacy was adopted by many nations that manufactured vaccines or possessed vaccine supplies, notably India and China.

== Impact on national politics ==
=== Argentina ===
The protests in Argentina in 2020 and 2021 are a series of demonstrations that take place from May 2020 in different parts of the country. The reasons are diverse, with the common denominator being discontent over the successive extensions of the isolation measures adopted to contain the spread of the coronavirus disease. For this reason, some media describe the protests as "antiquarantine." 4 5 6 Other slogans expressed opposition to the government, denial of the existence of the pandemic and demands for more freedom, among others.7 8

The demonstrations were held in different parts of the country, with the epicenter in the city of Buenos Aires. In general, the participants did so from their vehicles in order to keep their distance from other people, although in some cases the attendees did not comply with the prevention measures established by the authorities.

On 12 August 2021, a photo was leaked of a birthday party hosted by First Lady Fabiola Yáñez where President Alberto Fernández was present among many others during strict quarantine in July 2020. On 13 August 2021, the opposition presented a formal impeachment against Fernández asking for his removal for violating restrictions.

=== Belgium ===
On 17 March 2020, Sophie Wilmès was sworn in as Prime Minister of Belgium. Seven opposition parties pledged to support the minority Wilmès II Government, in its previous composition, with plenary power to handle the coronavirus pandemic in Belgium.

=== Brazil ===
President Jair Bolsonaro has been criticized for his handling of the crisis. He has referred to the pandemic as a "fantasy". According to one poll, 64% of Brazilians reject the way Bolsonaro has handled the pandemic, while 44.8% support his impeachment, an all-time high. During a speech by the president about the pandemic, many Brazilians participated in a panelaço protesting the president by banging pots and pans on balconies.

=== Cambodia ===
Cambodian Prime Minister Hun Sen was granted new powers in a draft state of emergency law amid the COVID-19 pandemic in Cambodia in March 2020. Several human rights organisations criticised the draft law as an opportunistic move to further centralise power and restrict civil rights.

=== Canada ===
On 13 March 2020, the Parliament of Canada voted to suspend activity in both houses until 20 April for the House of Commons and 21 April for the Senate. The House of Commons' Health and Finance committees were granted the ability to hold weekly virtual meetings during the pandemic.

The leadership contests of the Conservative Party of Canada, Green Party of British Columbia, Quebec Liberal Party and Parti Québécois were postponed.

On 1 December 2020, the Canadian federal government announced plans for a $100 billion to kick-start the countries post-pandemic economy. This is its biggest relief package since the Second World War and it will account for about to 3-4% of Canada's GDP and will bring the countries deficit to $381.6 billion.

On 7 January the Canadian government made it compulsory that travellers to Canada must have returned a negative COVID-19 test prior to travel. It was introduced to try to prevent new strains of COVID-19 from entering the country. This was to extends the restrictions on entry further from 26 March 2020 which saw a requirement that made it mandatory to isolate after entering Canada except if you were from the USA.

=== China ===
Multiple provincial-level administrators of the Chinese Communist Party (CCP) were dismissed over their handling of the quarantine efforts in central China. Some experts believe this is likely in a move to protect Communist Party general secretary Xi Jinping from people's anger over the coronavirus outbreak. A few countries have been using the epidemic to build political bridges with Beijing, raising accusations that these countries, which include Cambodia among others, were putting politics before health. Existing tensions between the United States and China may have delayed a coordinated effort to combat the outbreak in Wuhan.

Political scientist Victor Shih noted that certain features of COVID-19 made a strong response from Xi Jinping early in the pandemic more likely: First, COVID-19 mostly affected urban residents in dense major cities where the majority of mid-level Communist party officials lived. Second, COVID-19 spread so rapidly and easily that the authorities were compelled to act, or else risk losing control of it entirely.

Outlets such as Politico, Foreign Policy, and Bloomberg have reported that efforts from China to send aid to other countries and claim without evidence that the virus originated in the United States are a propaganda push for global influence while deflecting blame for its handling of the outbreak.

==== Hong Kong ====
Protests in Hong Kong strengthened due to fears of immigration from mainland China.

A 2022 political scandal occurred when reports emerged politician Witman Hung had held a birthday party in contravention with public health regulations.

=== France ===
A criminal negligence probe was launched by the Cour de Justice de la République into senior government officials' actions during the COVID-19 pandemic. In October 2020, police raided the homes of several senior officials, including former prime minister Édouard Philippe, as part of the probe. In September 2021, former Health Minister Agnès Buzyn was charged with "endangering the lives of others" for her actions during the pandemic.

=== Hungary ===
The Hungarian Parliament gave the government plenary power which authorizes it to override acts and to rule by decree to the extent that is "necessary and proportional" in order to "prevent, manage, and eradicate the epidemic and to avoid and mitigate its effects". The law prescribes that the government is to report back to the parliament, or if it's unable to convene, to its speaker and the leaders of the parliamentary groups, regularly about the measures it has taken. The law also suspends by-elections and referendums for the duration of the emergency. The Constitutional Court of Hungary is authorized to hold sessions via electronic communications networks. The act also criminalizes "statements known to be false or statements distorting true facts" with 1 to 5 years imprisonment "if done in a manner capable of hindering or derailing the effectiveness of the response effort". The opposition had demanded a 90-day sunset clause to the emergency powers in return for its support, but had its amendments voted down and therefore opposed the act.

Human Rights Watch described the legislation as an authoritarian takeover, due to the rule of decree supposedly without parliamentary or judicial scrutiny and for criminal penalties for the publishing of "false" or "distorted" facts, and gave support to the European Commission using Article 7 against Hungary. Criticism and concern regarding the decree stemmed from existing backsliding of Hungarian democracy under the premiership of Viktor Orbán and his majority-ruling Fidesz party since Orbán began his second tenure as Prime Minister in 2010. Orbán has been accused by opposition leaders and other critics of his premiership of shifting Hungary towards authoritarianism by centralizing legislative and executive power through Constitutional reforms passed in 2011 and 2013, curbing civil liberties, restricting freedom of speech to the extent that some independent media outlets once critical of his rule have since been acquired by allies of Orbán, and weakening other institutional checks on Orbán's power including the Constitutional Court and judiciary. Critics of the Orbán/Fidesz government expressed concern that the emergency plenary powers may not be rescinded once the pandemic subsides, and could be abused to dubiously prosecute independent journalists critical of his coronavirus response or his governance more broadly, and curtail other freedoms of speech and expression. Some observers suggest that any significant misuse of or, once the crisis subsides, failure to rescind the plenary powers by Orbán government could place Hungary at great risk of becoming the European Union's first dictatorship, in violation of E.U. regulations. A petition against the legislation was signed by over 100,000 people. Péter Jakab, the president of the opposition party Jobbik, said that the bill put Hungarian democracy in quarantine. Nézőpont, a pro-government polling agency, conducted a poll that showed that 90% of Hungarians supported extending emergency measures and 72% supported strengthening the criminal code.

In response to news reports about the state of emergency being a danger to democracy, Foreign Minister Péter Szijjártó called them "fake news and lies" and stated that the measures that Hungary had adopted were not unprecedented in Europe. He specifically stated that there were unfounded reports in mainstream media about the government's unlimited authorization and the closing down of the Parliament.

European Commission vice-president Věra Jourová after a thorough examination confirmed that Hungary's recently adopted emergency measures do not break any EU rules.

=== Iran ===
The Government of the Islamic Republic of Iran has been heavily affected by the virus. The spread of the virus has raised questions about the future survival of the regime. Iran's President Hassan Rouhani wrote a public letter to world leaders asking for help, saying that his country doesn't have access to international markets due to the United States sanctions against Iran. On 3 March 2020, Iranian Parliament was shut down after having 23 of the 290 members of parliament reported to have had tested positive for the virus.

=== Ireland ===
The COVID-19 pandemic in the Republic of Ireland has had a considerable impact on domestic politics. Gatherings attended by political figures while public health restrictions were in place became the subject of controversy. The Oireachtas Golf Society scandal resulted from a gathering attended by numerous members of Oireachtas, Ireland's parliament. The Katherine Zappone controversy involved a gathering attended by politician Katherine Zappone and others.

=== Israel ===
Pandemic and politics interlaced in Israel soon after the onset of the COVID-19 global spread and interacted with the country's March 2020 election. Facing criminal charges and unable to form a coalition, PM Netanyahu urged the establishment of a National Emergency Government (NEG). Abulof and Le Penne argue that Netanyahu succeeded partly through fearmongering. Suggesting that "If I fall, Israel falls", Netanyahu compared the COVID-19 crisis to the Holocaust, qualifying "unlike the holocaust, this time – this time, we identified the danger in time," saying that NEG headed by him is needed "like before the Six-Day War," to "save the country."

Pandemic politics also affected Israel's foreign relations. On 28 March 2020, the United Nations Special Coordinator for the Middle East Peace Process, Nickolay Mladenov praised the Israel and Palestinian authorities for their coordination in tackling the COVID-19 pandemic. Mladenov appreciated the response strategy, especially for focusing on Gaza, as the region faces a relatively substantial risk of the disease spreading. Since the start of the novel coronavirus crisis, Israel permitted the entry of significant medical and aid supplies inside Gaza.

=== Kosovo ===
On 18 March, Interior Minister Agim Veliu was sacked due to his support for declaring a state of emergency to handle the coronavirus pandemic which would have given power to the Kosovo Security Council chaired by Hashim Thaçi. The Democratic League of Kosovo, the junior partner leader of the coalition, filed a no-confidence vote motion in retaliation for the sacking and on 25 March eighty two members of the Kosovo Assembly voted in favor of the motion.

=== Malaysia ===
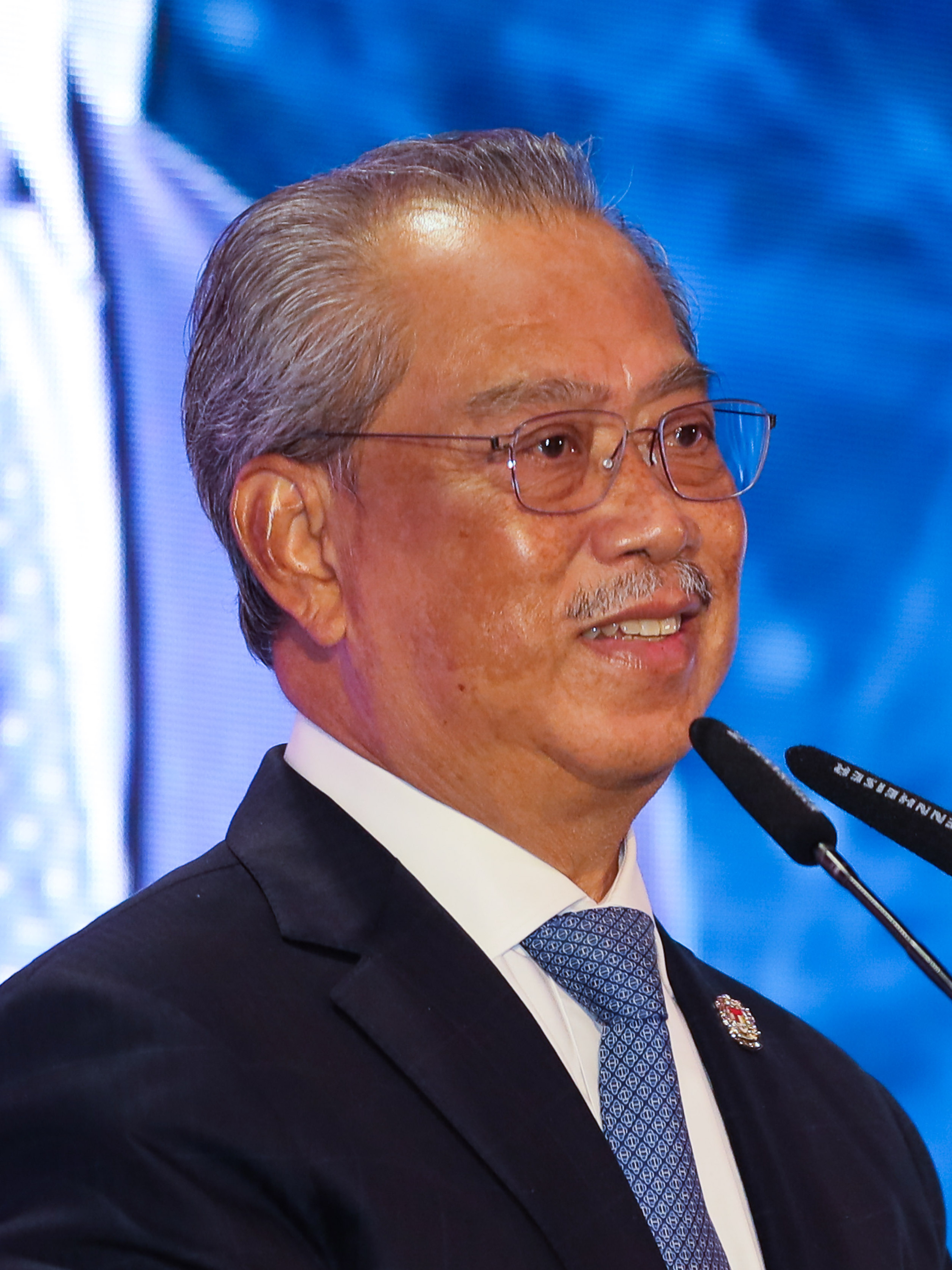
Malaysian Prime Minister Muhyiddin Yassin resigned after 17 months in power, as his government's response to the COVID-19 pandemic led to a loss of political support.

A political crisis in Malaysia coincided with the onset of the COVID-19 pandemic in the country. The Pakatan Harapan coalition government collapsed when party Malaysian United Indigenous Party withdrew, leading to the resignation of Prime Minister Mahathir Mohamad and eventual replacement with Muhyiddin Yassin and a new Perikatan Nasional coalition. A large outbreak at a Tablighi Jamaat religious event and spread of the virus across the country thought to have been exacerbated by the political instability, which newly appointed Health Minister Adham Baba used to criticize his predecessor Dzulkefly Ahmad, despite the absence of a clear government responsible at the time of the event.

Amid ongoing political instability, Yang di-Pertuan Agong warned politicians in May 2020 that he "would like to advise against dragging the country once again into a political mess that brings uncertainties" given the ongoing health crisis. Prime Minister Muhyiddin blamed the 2020 Sabah state election for a substantial increase in COVID-19 cases across the state and country.

In January 2021, a State of Emergency was declared, suspending all elections and parliament, and the government were empowered to pass laws without oversight in response to the pandemic and ongoing political instability. The declaration attracted political controversy. Some MPs resigned from the coalition in response, leading the loss of the government's required majority in the Dewan Rakyat. Opposition leader Anwar Ibrahim criticised the declaration, saying this was an effort for the government to maintain power and that 115 other MPs were against it. Malaysia's king allowed parliament to reconvene to debate the measures, but the government blocked parliament from doing so, attracting rare criticism from the monarch. Continued debate was later cut short by COVID-19 cases in parliament, causing it to be suspended again.

In July 2021, the largest political party UMNO withdrew support for Prime Minister Muhyiddin and called for his resignation, citing dissatisfaction with his handling of the pandemic. They cited an extension of the nationwide "total lockdown", a record surge in COVID-19 infections, as well as dissatisfaction with the economic response. The government eventually collapsed in August 2021 after MPs withdrew their support over its COVID-19 response, leading to the resignation of Prime Minister Muhyiddin Yassin and dissolution of his government. This made Muhyiddin the country's shortest serving premier, in office for only 17 months.

=== Myanmar ===
During the 2021 Myanmar coup d'état, State Counsellor Aung San Suu Kyi and President Win Myint were detained and charged by the Tatmadaw over allegations of breaching COVID-19 restriction laws.

Healthcare workers working on the COVID-19 pandemic response in the country protested against the coup by refusing to work, which sparked a widespread protest and civil disobedience movement across the country against the military.

=== Slovenia ===
On its 1st Session on 13 March 2020, immediately following its confirmation, the 13th Government set up an informal Crisis Management Staff (CMS) of the Republic of Slovenia in order to contain and manage the COVID-19 epidemic. Head of the Staff was Prime Minister Janez Janša and its secretary was former SOVA director Andrej Rupnik. CMS was composed of all government members (prime minister and ministers) and other experts and civil servants in an advisory capacity. Head of the Health Group was Bojana Beovič. Jelko Kacin, former minister and ambassador to NATO, was the official spokesman of the Staff, he had a similar role during the 1991 Slovenian war of independence.

Crisis Management Staff was abolished on 24 March 2020 after the political transition was completed, its functions were transferred on the responsible ministries. Health Experts Group was transferred under the Ministry of Health. Kacin became the official government spokesperson on the topic.

Government never proposed the declaration of emergency to the National Assembly, which would suspend the Assembly's powers and transfer them to the President of the Republic Borut Pahor to rule by decrees with the force of law, which are still subject to the National Assembly's approval once it gains its powers back. The provision is only applicable if the National Assembly is unable to meet in the session. Assembly however passed a Rules of Procedure Amendment to enable itself a "long-distance" session using technology.

=== South Korea ===
Diplomatic relations between Japan and South Korea worsened, as South Korea criticized Japan's "ambiguous and passive quarantine efforts", after Japan announced anybody coming from South Korea will be placed in two weeks' quarantine at government-designated sites.

Following the outbreak of the virus in South Korea over 1,450,000 people signed a petition supporting the impeachment of President Moon Jae-in due to him sending masks and medical supplies to China to aid them in their response to the virus outbreak. Moon administration's continuing handling of the crisis has however been noted in other sectors of the Korean society and internationally. An opinion poll by Gallup Korea in March 2020 showed Moon's approval rating rising by 5% to 49%. In April 2020, Moon's Democratic Party won a record landslide in the country's legislative election for 21st session until 2024.

Maintaining the quality of universal healthcare is paramount to South Korea, because the country's population is aging rapidly, and the government's health policy reaction to the long COVID-19 pandemic will remain a crucial issue in future elections.

=== Spain ===
On 12 March 2020, the Congress of Deputies voted to suspend activity for a week after multiple members had tested positive for the virus. When the Congress of Deputies approved the extension of the State of Alarm on 18 March, it was the first time that opposition parties Popular Party and Vox had supported the government in a vote while separatist parties, such as Catalan Republican Left, abstained from the vote.

The response to the coronavirus has been complicated by the fact that Pedro Sánchez is leading PSOE (in coalition with Unidas Podemos) minority government which is counting on support from opposition parties to enact coronavirus measures, especially with regards to economic stimulus. So far, the cabinet is discussing proposals to offer zero-interest loans to tenants to pay rent so that smaller landlords who depend on rent income can stay afloat. PP leader Pablo Casado complained that the government was not keeping him informed of developments on the coronavirus. Ciudadanos leader Inés Arrimadas said that she supports the government's actions. The decentralized nature of Spanish politics led to a situation in the first phase of the pandemic in which Spain had the fastest increase of COVID-19 cases of any country in Europe due to poor intergovernmental coordination. The recentralization of health policy in the fall of 2020 should have a positive impact on Spain's ability to weather future crises.

=== Sweden ===
In mid-March, the parliamentary leaders from the parties in the Riksdag agreed on using pairing for the upcoming weeks, to make it possible to decrease the number of members of parliament present during voting sessions, from the usual 349 to 55. This decision was taken both as a measure to lower the risk of spread of the infection (social distancing), and to make sure the daily work in the parliament could proceed even if a big number of MPs would become sick. Similar decisions were taken in many of Swedish municipal councils. Several regional assemblies also decreased the number of politicians present each session, including Västerbotten County who did it as a measure to decrease long-distance travelling, and Scania County.

On 25 March, The Swedish Social Democratic Party together with the Swedish Trade Union Confederation decided to cancel their traditional May Day demonstrations. They will instead hold an event on a digital platform, which will include speeches by the Swedish prime minister and leader of the Social Democrats, Stefan Löfven, as well as union confederation leader Karl-Petter Thorwaldsson. The Left Party also cancelled their nationwide demonstrations, and announced that there would instead be a digital celebration, including a speech by party leader Jonas Sjöstedt. The Almedalen Week, considered to be the biggest and most important forum in Sweden for seminars, debates and political speeches on current social issues, held in Visby every summer, was cancelled as a result of the ban on large gatherings. The decision was taken on 1 April by the organiser after consultation with the major political parties. Prime Minister Stefan Löfvén had already announced that he had cancelled his planned participation in the upcoming event. A similar event in Stockholm, 'Järvaveckan', was also cancelled, and will not be held until 2021. The annual LGBT festival West Pride in Gothenburg was also cancelled as a result of the pandemic. Instead, the organisers proclaimed 25 May to 7 June a 'flag period', encouraging organisations and individuals to hoist the rainbow flag.

=== Tunisia ===
A 2021 political crisis occurred in Tunisia when President Kais Saied dismissed the government amid a surge in COVID-19 cases and protests over the economic fallout.

=== United Kingdom ===
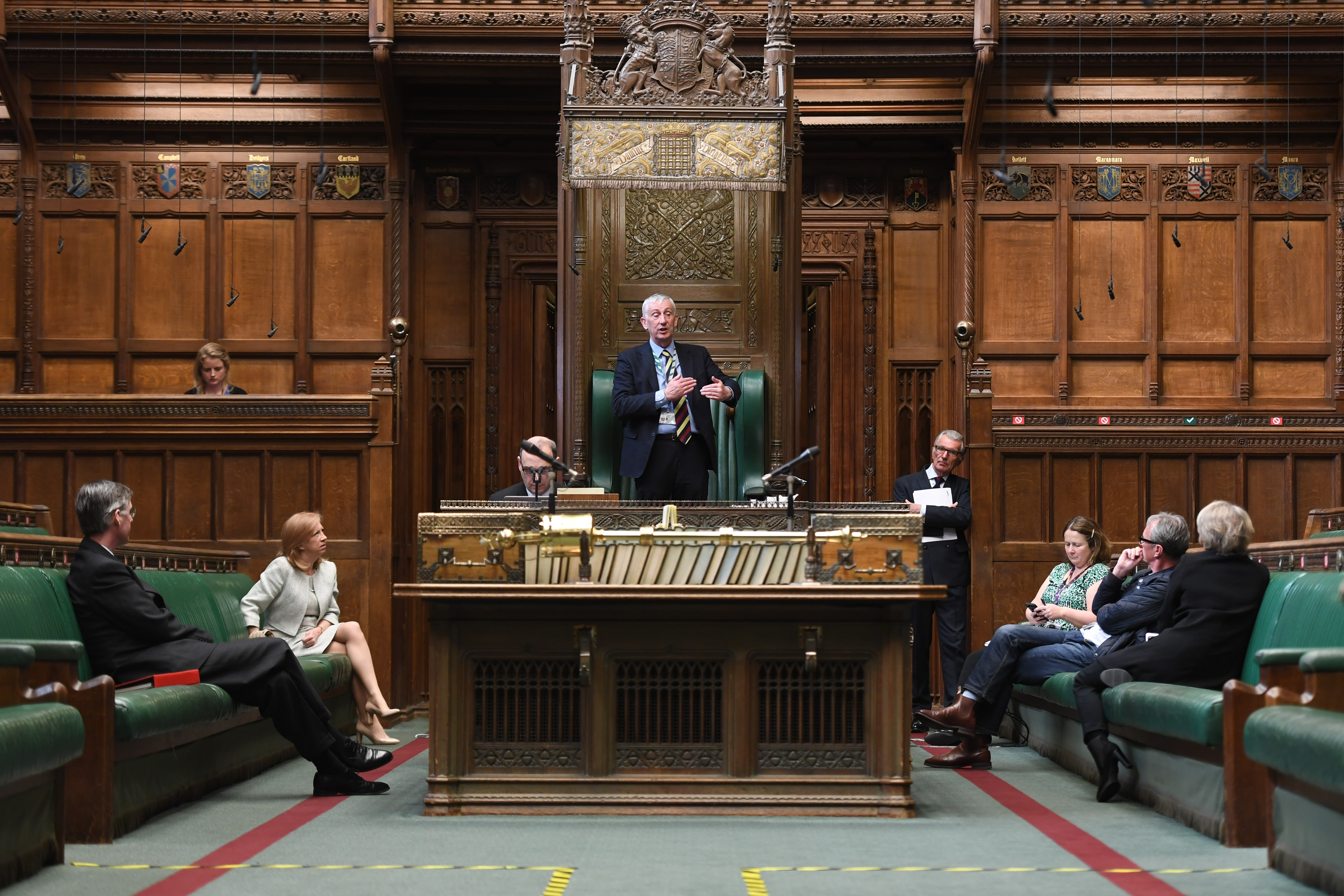
A rehearsal for hybrid remote and in-person procedures in the UK's House of Commons to reduce the spread of COVID-19 among parliamentarians in April 2020

The British government response to the COVID-19 pandemic has been politically controversial, in particular the level of preparedness and the early response to the outbreak and timing of subsequent lockdowns in autumn and winter 2020 that whether they influenced country's high death toll. Shortages of personal protective equipment (PPE) for health workers, as well as some supplies of PPE later procured proving to be inadequate, attracted controversy during the early months of the pandemic. A public inquiry into the government's handling was announced in May 2021 to take place in 2023 after demands from pressure group Covid-19 Bereaved Families for Justice.

In May 2020, the actions of Boris Johnson's senior aide, Dominic Cummings, were the subject of a political scandal as he was accused of breaking lockdown rules while experiencing symptoms of COVID-19. Johnson's defence of him, and Cummings' public press conference to defend his innocence both attracted criticism, as was the eventual rejection of widespread calls for Cummings to resign over the breach. Cummings left the government in late 2020, and subsequently criticised the government's response to the pandemic, including in a seven-hour testimony to the Commons Heath, and Science and Technology committees in May 2021.

In August 2020, school exam grades standardisation algorithm attracted controversy. Whilst the algorithm was designed to combat grade inflation nearly 36% of students were one grade lower than teachers' predictions and 3% were down two grades. This resulted in public outcry. In response to the outcry, on 15 August, Gavin Williamson said that the grading system is here to stay, and there will be "no U-turn, no change". Two days later on 17 August, Ofqual and Gavin Williamson agreed to a u-turn and grades would now be reissued using unmoderated teacher predictions.

Government contracts related to the pandemic response have also attracted political controversy, with several senior politicians including Matt Hancock accused of cronyism by providing lucrative contracts to private companies connected to the Conservative Party. Hancock was found to have acted unlawfully by the High Court by not publishing details of a contract within 30 days. The Greensill scandal, which implicated former Prime Minister David Cameron, involved Cameron lobbying the UK government to receive an emergency loan for supply chain financing firm Greensill Capital as part of the government's economic response to COVID-19, and highlighted links between civil servants and private companies. COVID-19 related contracts culminated in a lobbying scandal involving Conservative MP Owen Paterson, leading to his resignation despite initial attempts by the government to avoid Paterson's suspension from parliament.

It has also been suggested that the pandemic has highlighted regional inequalities in the UK including the purported North–South divide. Leaders in Northern England such as Mayor of Greater Manchester Andy Burnham and several Conservative MPs, including those in the Northern Research Group, criticised the government when their regions were placed under local lockdown regulations and later tier regulations in England, citing the economic impact and accused the central government of providing inadequate fiscal support.

Controversies have arisen from government officials allegedly breaching public health advice or restrictions. Catherine Calderwood and Neil Ferguson resigned from their respective positions for travelling during the March 2020 lockdown. Health Secretary Matt Hancock became embroiled in a scandal in 2021 when photographs emerged of him breaching social distancing measures by kissing aide Gina Coladangelo in his workplace, which led to his resignation in June 2021. Following the July 2021 lifting of the legal requirement to wear face coverings indoors, parliament became divided along ideological lines, with those who viewed them "as an unreasonable imposition on personal freedoms", mainly Conservative MPs, no longer wearing them whilst others continued to wear them. Starting in December 2021, "Partygate" became a major political scandal, revolving around government and Conservative Party staff holding social gatherings during COVID-19 lockdowns in the UK, when these were prohibited. Boris Johnson and Rishi Sunak both received fixed penalty notices. The controversy eventually played a role in a later government crisis and Johnson's resignation.

Some political parties and politicians have opposed government pandemic restrictions. The COVID Recovery Group within the Conservative Party pushed to lift lockdown restrictions while they were in place.{] Nigel Farage's Brexit Party rebranded as Reform UK in late 2020, with its primary focus being opposing COVID-19 lockdowns.

The government implemented a Virtual House of Commons to minimise the spread of the virus among parliamentarians.

The leader of the opposition, Keir Starmer, his deputy Angela Rayner, and other members of the Labour Party were investigated by the police for alleged breaches of COVID-19 regulations in the 'Beergate' affair. They were eventually cleared of any wrongdoing.

=== United States ===
Owing to the stock market crash, high unemployment claims, and reduced economic activity caused by the coronavirus pandemic the United States Congress convened to create legislation to address the economic effects of the pandemic and passed the Coronavirus Aid, Relief, and Economic Security Act (CARES Act). Representative Thomas Massie attempted to maneuver for a roll-call vote, but there was insufficient demand among the quorum present and the House passed the bill by voice vote on 27 March.

The outbreak prompted calls for the United States to adopt social policies common in other wealthy countries, including universal health care, universal child care, paid sick leave, and higher levels of funding for public health. Trump was also criticized for embracing medical populism, giving medical advice on Twitter and at press conferences. Political analysts anticipated it may negatively affect Donald Trump's chances of re-election in the 2020 presidential election. Some state emergency orders have waived open meeting laws that require the public have physical access to the meeting location, allowing meetings to be held by public teleconference.

In February 2020, Senator Richard Burr sold over $1.6 million worth of stock before the stock market crash using insider knowledge from a closed Senate meeting where Senators were briefed on how coronavirus could affect the United States. Burr, after dumping the stock, called his brother-in-law who immediately called his own stockbroker. (The Securities and Exchange Commission (SEC) was still investigating the apparent case of insider trading as of October 2021.) Stock transactions made by Senators Dianne Feinstein, Kelly Loeffler, and Jim Inhofe were also placed under scrutiny for possible insider trading in early 2020. On 30 March 2020, the Department of Justice initiated a probe into the stock transactions with the SEC.

Captain Brett Crozier wrote a four-page memo requesting help for his crew, as a viral outbreak had occurred on board his ship, the USS Theodore Roosevelt. However, he was soon relieved of his command over the ship, because the memo was leaked to the public. The Acting Navy Secretary Thomas Modly initially justified his actions to fire Crozier, saying that the captain was "too naïve or too stupid" to be a commanding officer if he did not think that the information would get out to the public in this information age, but later issued an apology in which he acknowledged that Crozier intended to draw public attention to the circumstances on his ship. Several members of Congress called for Modly's resignation for his handling of the situation, which he did on 7 April.

Although New York Governor Andrew Cuomo was initially praised for his leadership during the COVID-19 pandemic in New York when the state was the epicenter of the pandemic in April 2020, his administration became embroiled in a 2021 scandal over allegations of a cover-up of the number of deaths in nursing homes into which the FBI began several investigations. Cuomo resigned 23 August 2021 after increasing numbers of sexual harassment allegations were made public.

In 2022, U.S. Senator Jim Inhofe of Oklahoma announced he had COVID and said he would not serve out the remainder of his term. A year later, he told reporters: "Five or six others [serving in Congress] have [long COVID], but I'm the only one who admits it."

==== State politics ====
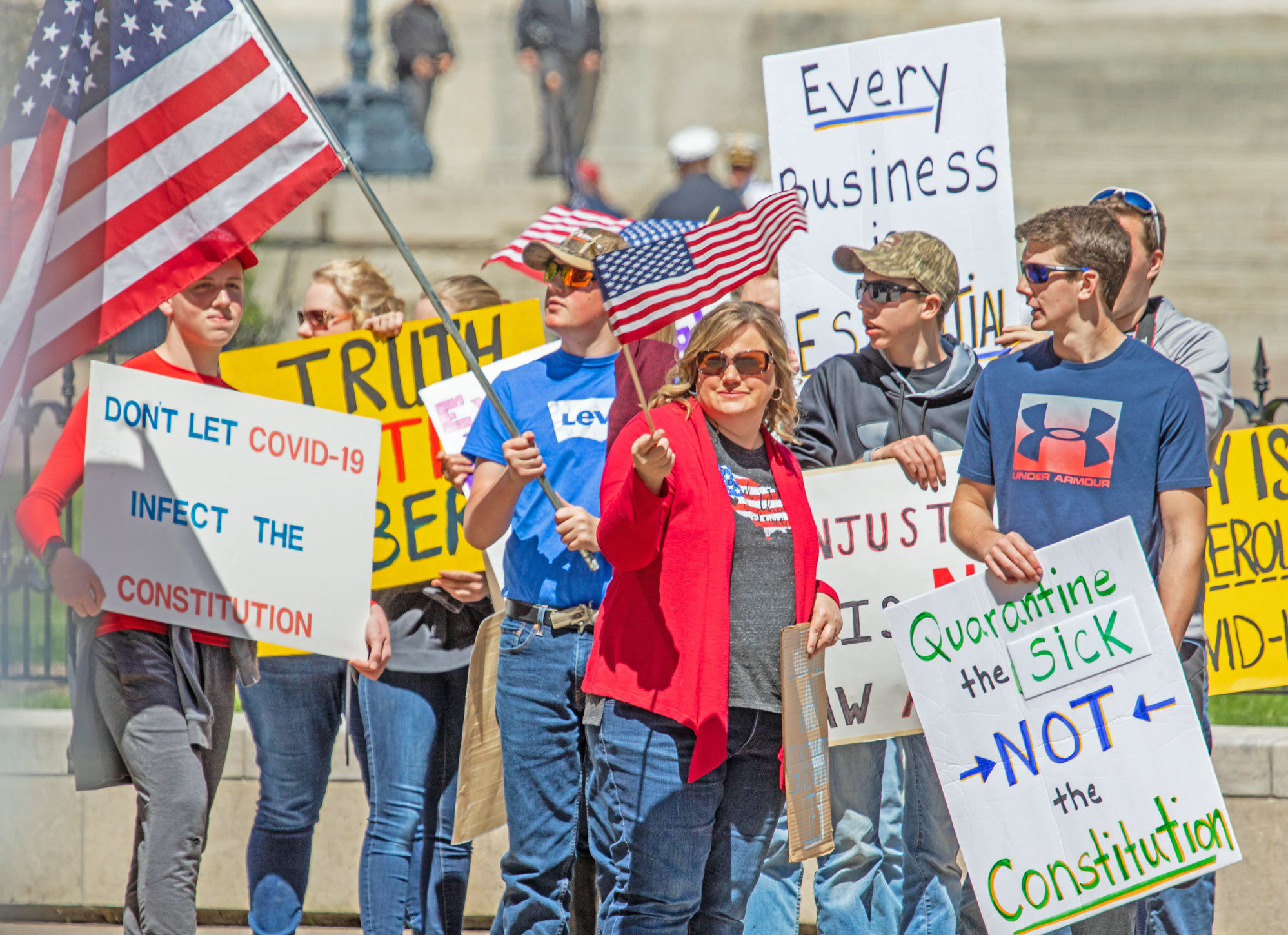
Several hundred anti-lockdown protesters rallied at the Ohio Statehouse 20 April 2020.

Multiple U.S. states suspended legislative activity including Colorado, Kentucky, Delaware, Georgia, Illinois, New Hampshire, and Vermont.

On 11 March 2020, New Mexico Governor Michelle Lujan Grisham vetoed $150 million worth on infrastructure projects due to the state losing $22 million in its general fund for every $1 decrease in the price of a barrel of oil as a result of the Russia–Saudi Arabia oil price war. The Alaska Department of Revenue delayed its release of its budget forecast due to Alaska's dependence on oil prices.

On 10 March, Georgia state senator Brandon Beach started showing symptoms of COVID-19 and was tested on 14 March. However, he attended a special session of the legislature on 16 March before his test results arrived on 18 March showing that he had tested positive. The entire Georgia state senate, their staffs, and Lieutenant Governor Geoff Duncan went into quarantine until 30 March.

Coronavirus restrictions also disrupted thousands of political campaigns across America, limiting the canvassing and in-person fundraising candidates have long-relied on to win office. Political insiders believe that could give incumbents a bigger advantage than normal.

=== Venezuela ===
Reuters reported that during the pandemic, allies of both Nicolás Maduro and Juan Guaidó had secretly begun exploratory talks, according to sources on both sides. Guaidó and U.S. Special Representative for Venezuela Elliott Abrams have denied that negotiations have taken place.

== Impact on elections ==
=== Argentina ===
The 2021 legislative election had previously been scheduled to take place on 24 October 2021, but was postponed due to the COVID-19 pandemic to 14 November 2021.

=== Australia ===
The five state elections held in Australia during the first 14 months of the COVID-19 pandemic have, in each case, returned the incumbent government to power. These results have been viewed as a reward for maintaining a COVID-safe environment in their electorates. Four elections reinstated centre-left governments (Labor) and the final one reinstated a centre-right government (Liberal). The election in Western Australia returned a State government with an unprecedented result winning 90% of seats. In contrast, in the Tasmanian election the status quo was maintained. Four of the elections were held in a timely manner, while the fifth (in Tasmania) was brought forward by one year, apparently to take advantage of the anticipated elector sentiment for rewarding governments that have maintained COVID-safe status.

=== Bolivia ===
On 21 March 2020, President Jeanine Áñez announced the interim government's decision to postpone the snap election. Other presidential candidates had suggested postponing the election to prevent the spread of coronavirus through the congregation of large groups of people.

=== Chile ===
A plebiscite on a new constitution and the convention that would write it was scheduled on 25 April, but on 19 March, political parties reached an agreement on postponing the plebiscite to 25 October. This agreement also postponed municipal and regional elections, from 25 October to 4 April 2021, with the primaries and second rounds of elections being postponed too.

=== Dominican Republic ===
On 13 April 2020, the electoral body of Dominican Republic decided to postpone the presidential and legislative elections which were originally scheduled for 17 May of the same year. The new selected date was 5 July 2020, and, in case none of the presidential candidates reached the absolute majority (50% + 1 vote), the second round will be held on 26 July.

The general election to elect the President and members of the Dominican Republic Congress, which was postponed from the scheduled 17 May 2020 date due to the COVID-19 pandemic, was later held on 5 July 2020.

=== Ethiopia ===
On 31 March, the National Electoral Board of Ethiopia delayed the House of Representatives elections that were originally scheduled for 29 August, due to the outbreak of coronavirus in Ethiopia.

=== France ===
President Emmanuel Macron declared coronavirus as the "biggest health crisis in a century". On 12 March he stated that the first round of local elections would not be rescheduled. The choice to maintain the elections, which took place on 15 March, generated significant controversy. On 16 March, he stated that the second round, originally scheduled for 22 March, would be delayed until 21 June.

=== Hong Kong ===
The 2020 Hong Kong Legislative Council election was originally scheduled on 6 September 2020 until it was postponed by the government for a whole year to 5 September 2021. On 31 July 2020, Chief Executive Carrie Lam announced that she was invoking the Emergency Regulations Ordinance to postpone the election under its emergency powers, citing the recent resurgence of the COVID-19 cases, adding that the move was supported by Beijing.

=== Indonesia ===
The 2020 Indonesian local elections were scheduled to be held on 23 September was postponed, and the Indonesian General Elections Commission proposed postponement to 9 December at the earliest, which was then approved by the People's Representative Council and then signed into law by President Joko Widodo on 5 May. The election's previous budget of around US$550 million was reallocated towards pandemic management and control.

=== Italy ===
A referendum on a constitutional amendment to decrease the number of members of parliament from 630 to 400 in the Chamber and from 315 to 200 in the Senate was initially scheduled to be held on 29 March, but was postponed to 20 and 21 September following the outbreak of the virus in Italy.

=== Kiribati ===
The first round of the parliamentary elections was originally planned to be held on 7 April 2020, but was later moved to 15 April, with the second round planned for the next week due to the coronavirus pandemic although there were no cases in the country at the time.

=== Latvia ===
On 6 April 2020, the Prime Minister – Krišjānis Kariņš – announced the government's decision to postpone the Riga City Council elections. Originally, the elections were scheduled for 25 April; election posters had already appeared. As the pandemic developed, the elections were rescheduled for 6 June but were not held until 29 August 2020.

=== New Zealand ===
On 17 August 2020, Prime Minister Jacinda Ardern announced that the upcoming election would be delayed by almost 4 weeks from 19 September to 17 October. The country's biggest city, Auckland, had seen a recent rise in cases of COVID-19 and was placed on a restrictive 3 week lockdown. Due to safety concerns and an inability for political parties to campaign properly, Ardern agreed to a call from opposition and government parties to delay the election. The New Zealand election returned an increased majority for the incumbent government of Prime Minister Jacinda Ardern. Before the 2020 election, the Labour Party held government in coalition with two other parties (the Greens and NZ First). The election returned the first majority Labour government for NZ since 1946.

=== Malaysia ===
The 2020 Sabah state election went ahead in September 2020 with certain Standard Operating Procedures (SOP) in place, but was later blamed for a surge in COVID-19 cases in Sabah and across the country by Prime Minister Muhyiddin Yassin. In December 2020, a State of Emergency was invoked to postpone by-elections in two constituencies, one of which was thought to be the epicentre of a COVID-19 outbreak. In January 2021, a State of Emergency was declared nationwide, suspending all elections. After the nationwide emergency ended in August 2021, a localised one was almost immediately declared in Sarawak, postponing a state election until 2022 due to the risk of COVID-19.

=== Paraguay ===
In March 2020, the Tribunal Superior de Justicia Electoral (TSJE), the local elections regulatory agency, decided to postpone the municipal elections to elect Mayors and Councilors of municipal boards of the 261 districts of the country that was initially planned for 8 November 2020.

=== Philippines ===
On 10 March 2020, the Commission on Elections (COMELEC) suspended nationwide voter registration until the end of the month due to the COVID-19 pandemic. The registration period began 20 January and is scheduled to run until 30 September 2021. The suspension was later extended to last until the end of April. The issuance of voter's certification is also suspended until further notice. The next nationwide elections scheduled in the Philippines is in May 2022.

The plebiscite to ratify legislation which proposes the division of Palawan into three smaller provinces scheduled for May 2020 was delayed due to the COVID-19 pandemic. Palawan's provincial legislature called for a special session and passed a resolution allowing their governor to ask COMELEC to postpone the plebiscite. The plebiscite was postponed to and successfully held on 13 March 2021, with voters rejecting the division of their province.

=== Poland ===
Initially the Polish government chose to not delay the presidential election, a decision which caused controversy. Polling has shown 78% of the population to prefer postponing the election. The opposition to the ruling party Law and Justice has argued that the pandemic conditions prevent effective campaigning, and hence reduce the competitiveness of the election. On 27 March, some candidates for the presidential election failed to collect 100,000 signatures due to the coronavirus pandemic with only twelve presidential candidates having successfully collected over 100,000 signatures. Seven candidates submitted petitions with less than 100,000 signatures, but plan to appeal the central election commission's refusal to register them in the presidential election citing the coronavirus pandemic hampering the signature collection process.

A change to Poland's election laws was proposed to allow postal voting for those over 60 and those under quarantine but not abroad, which was criticized as favoring the incumbent Law and Justice Party. Laws under discussion by parliament in mid-April define the entire vote to be postal and weaken the role of the electoral commission, despite postal workers unions saying this would be impossible.

On 6 May, the Polish governing coalition announced the presidential election would be postponed due to the pandemic. On 3 June 2020 Marshal of the Sejm Elżbieta Witek announced that first round of the delayed election would occur on 28 June 2020, with 12 July 2020 scheduled for the runoff, if it is necessary.

=== Russia ===
On 25 March, President Vladimir Putin announced the postponement of the constitutional referendum scheduled for 22 April to a later date, which was later chosen to be 1 July.

Also, the Central Election Commission postponed about a hundred local elections scheduled for the period from 29 March to 21 June.

Regional elections in more than 20 regions are due to be held on a "single election day" on 13 September. However, the campaign must start no later than 15 June. According to media reports, depending on the epidemiological situation, the Federal government allows the postponement of a single election day to December 2020 or the holding of these regional elections on a 2021 single election day.

=== Serbia ===
On 16 March 2020, the electoral commission postponed the parliamentary election that was initially planned for 26 April.

=== Singapore ===
The 2020 Singaporean general election was held on 10 July 2020. The Elections Department had rolled out a series of measures in response to the pandemic to ensure that the elections can be held. No rallies and TV screenings pertaining to the election are to be held. Nomination centres will not admit members of the public and walkabouts, though allowed, should have safe distancing and minimal physical contact. Candidates are also not be allowed to make speeches, including during the campaigning, from campaigning vehicles, meaning that there will be no parades by the candidates held post-election.

=== Spain ===
The 2020 Basque regional election, scheduled for 5 April, were delayed, after an agreement between all the political parties represented in the Basque parliament; the Galician elections were also suspended.

=== Sri Lanka ===
On 19 March, Election Commissioner Mahinda Deshapriya announced that the 2020 Sri Lankan parliamentary election will be postponed indefinitely until further notice due to the coronavirus pandemic. Sri Lankan President Gotabaya Rajapaksa initially insisted that scheduled forthcoming the election would proceed as planned on 25 April despite the coronavirus pandemic, and the authorities banned election rallies and meetings.

=== Syria ===
The parliamentary elections originally scheduled for 13 April were delayed to 20 May to protect Syria from coronavirus.

=== Trinidad and Tobago ===
The general election originally scheduled for September might be delayed but "will be held when constitutionally due" despite the coronavirus. Pre-campaigning was partially suspended on 13 March following news of the first reported case of COVID-19 in Trinidad and Tobago.

=== United Kingdom ===
On 13 March 2020, the United Kingdom local elections that were meant to be held on 7 May were rescheduled by Prime Minister Boris Johnson to 6 May 2021 following the advice of the Electoral Commission and in agreement with Labour and the Liberal Democrats.

309 local elections and 40 police and crime commissioner elections were going to be held on 7 May 2020 but all were postponed.

The pivotal mayor of London election was set to be held on 7 May 2020 but it was postponed due to the increasing levels of coronavirus cases.

On 27 March, the Liberal Democrats postponed their leadership election, at first to May 2021, before moving it back to July 2020.

=== United States ===
==== Presidential ====
States with at least one local, state, or federal primary election date or method of voting altered as of 5 August 2020

The 2020 US presidential election continued to go ahead at the correct time without being cancelled or postponed which has never happened in the entire history in Presidential elections. If the elections was postponed or cancelled this would have been the first time in history in the US and may have likely led to political dispute.

===== Campaign =====
Political campaigns switched to online and virtual activities in mid-March to either avoid the spreading of coronavirus or to be in compliance with statewide social distancing rules. Former Vice President Joe Biden and Senator Bernie Sanders started giving online town halls and virtual fundraisers. President Donald Trump's presidential campaign also shifted from in-person to virtual campaigning due to stay-at-home orders and social distancing rules made after his 2 March rally and both his and other Republican leadership offices based in Virginia were closed due to stay-at-home orders issued by Governor Ralph Northam.

On 15 March, the first one-on-one debate of the 2020 Democratic presidential primaries took place between Joe Biden and Bernie Sanders in CNN's Washington, D.C. studios and without an audience, as a result of the ongoing COVID-19 pandemic. The debate was moved from Arizona, which is under a state of emergency and had 12 confirmed cases of COVID-19 on that date.

On 2 April, the Democratic National Convention, which was originally scheduled to be held from 13 to 16 July, was delayed to the week of 17 August after the Democratic National Committee communicated with the presidential campaigns of Joe Biden and Bernie Sanders. On 5 April Biden suggested "a virtual convention" may be necessary; Trump told Fox News' Sean Hannity there was "no way" he would cancel the Republican National convention, scheduled to begin on 24 August in Charlotte, NC.

House Speaker Nancy Pelosi (D-CA) and Senators Amy Klobuchar (D-MN) and Ron Wyden (D-OR) expressed concern in early April that the pandemic might lower voter turnout in November. Closings of churches, universities, and driver's license centers will make it more difficult for voters to register and the Democracy Project at the Brennan Center for Justice expect turnout to be low, as it was during the 17 March Illinois Democratic primary. Georgia state House Speaker David Ralston (R), predicted that mailing absentee ballot request forms to all voters in the state during the coronavirus crisis would be "devastating" for GOP candidates, and President Trump said that some of the election reforms would make it harder for Republicans to win office.

There were calls to postpone the 2020 U.S. presidential election to 2021, but many constitutional scholars and lawmakers said it would be very difficult to do without amending the Constitution.

===== Primaries =====
On 12 March 2020, the North Dakota Democratic-NPL cancelled its state convention that was meant to be held from 19 to 22 March where statewide candidates would have been nominated and delegates to the Democratic National Convention would have been selected. On 13 March, the presidential primary in Louisiana was postponed to 20 June by Secretary of State Kyle Ardoin and Wyoming had its in-person portion of its caucus and all county conventions suspended and replaced with mail-in ballots.

On 14 March, the presidential primary in Georgia was moved from 24 March to 19 May; on 9 April, the entire primary was again moved to 9 June. On 16 March, Secretary of State Michael Adams announced that the Kentucky primaries would be moved from 19 May to 23 June and Governor Mike DeWine postponed the Ohio primaries despite legal challenges. On 19 March, Governor Ned Lamont moved the Connecticut Democratic primary from 28 April to 2 June. On 20 March, Indiana Governor Eric Holcomb, Secretary of State Connie Lawson, Republican state chairman Kyle Hupfer, and Democratic state chairman John Zody announced that Indiana's primaries were rescheduled from 5 May to 2 June.

On 21 March, Governor Wanda Vázquez Garced postponed the Puerto Rico presidential primary from 29 March to 26 April. The Alaska Democratic Party canceled in-person voting for its presidential primary and extended its mail-in voting time to 10 April. Governor John Carney postponed the Delaware presidential primary from 28 April to 2 June. The Democratic Party of Hawaii canceled in-person voting for its presidential primary and delayed it from 4 April to sometime in May. Governor Gina Raimondo postponed the Rhode Island presidential primary at the request of the board of elections from 28 April to 2 June. On 27 March, Governor Tom Wolf signed into law legislation passed by the state legislature to postpone Pennsylvania's primaries from 28 April to 2 June. On 28 March, Governor Andrew Cuomo announced at a news conference that New York's presidential primary would be postponed from 28 April to 23 June. On 8 April, Governor Phil Murphy signed an executive order to reschedule the primary election scheduled to be held on 2 June to 7 July.

On 30 March, the Kansas Democratic Party announced that its presidential primary would be conducted only through mail-in ballots, and Governor Brad Little and Secretary of State Lawerence Denney also announced that Idaho's primary elections would also be conducted entirety through mail-in ballots. On 1 April, Governor Jim Justice signed an executive order to postpone West Virginia's primaries from 12 May to 9 June.

Polling places in Florida, Ohio, Illinois and Arizona that were located in senior living facilities were moved and other health precautions were enacted. Local election directors in Maryland asked for the state's primary to be changed to only use mail-in ballots and former Deputy Secretary of the Treasury Mary J. Miller asked for Governor Larry Hogan to switch to mail-in ballots.

State	Original date	New date
Puerto Rico	29 March 2020	26 April 2020
Georgia	24 March 2020	9 June 2020
Connecticut	28 April 2020	2 June 2020
Delaware	28 April 2020	2 June 2020
Ohio	17 March 2020	2 June 2020
Pennsylvania	28 April 2020	2 June 2020
Rhode Island	28 April 2020	2 June 2020
Indiana	5 May 2020	2 June 2020
West Virginia	12 May 2020	9 June 2020
Louisiana	4 April 2020	20 June 2020
Kentucky	19 May 2020	23 June 2020
New York	28 April 2020	23 June 2020
New Jersey	2 June 2020	7 July 2020

===== General elections =====
In October 2020, the editors of the New England Journal of Medicine unanimously published an unprecedented editorial calling for the current American leadership to be voted out in the November election, writing "countries were forced to make hard choices about how to respond. Here in the United States, our leaders have failed that test. They have taken a crisis and turned it into a tragedy." Science Advances also published a research study that revealed "states with more COVID-19 fatalities were less likely to support Republican candidates."

In November 2020, Donald Trump lost his bid for reelection to former Vice President Joe Biden, in an election dominated by COVID-19's impact on all aspects of American life.

==== State ====
===== Campaign =====
Thirty-four Democratic and Republican candidates in New York signed a petition asking Governor Andrew Cuomo for the primary petition signature amounts to be decreased or eliminated for the primaries to prevent spreading or contracting the virus during signature collection. On 14 March, Cuomo reduced the signature requirement to 30% of the normal limit and moved the deadline from 2 April to 17 March.

On 26 March, the Green Party said the pandemic would prevent third-party candidates from appearing on the ballot unless petitioning requirements were reduced.

===== Elections =====
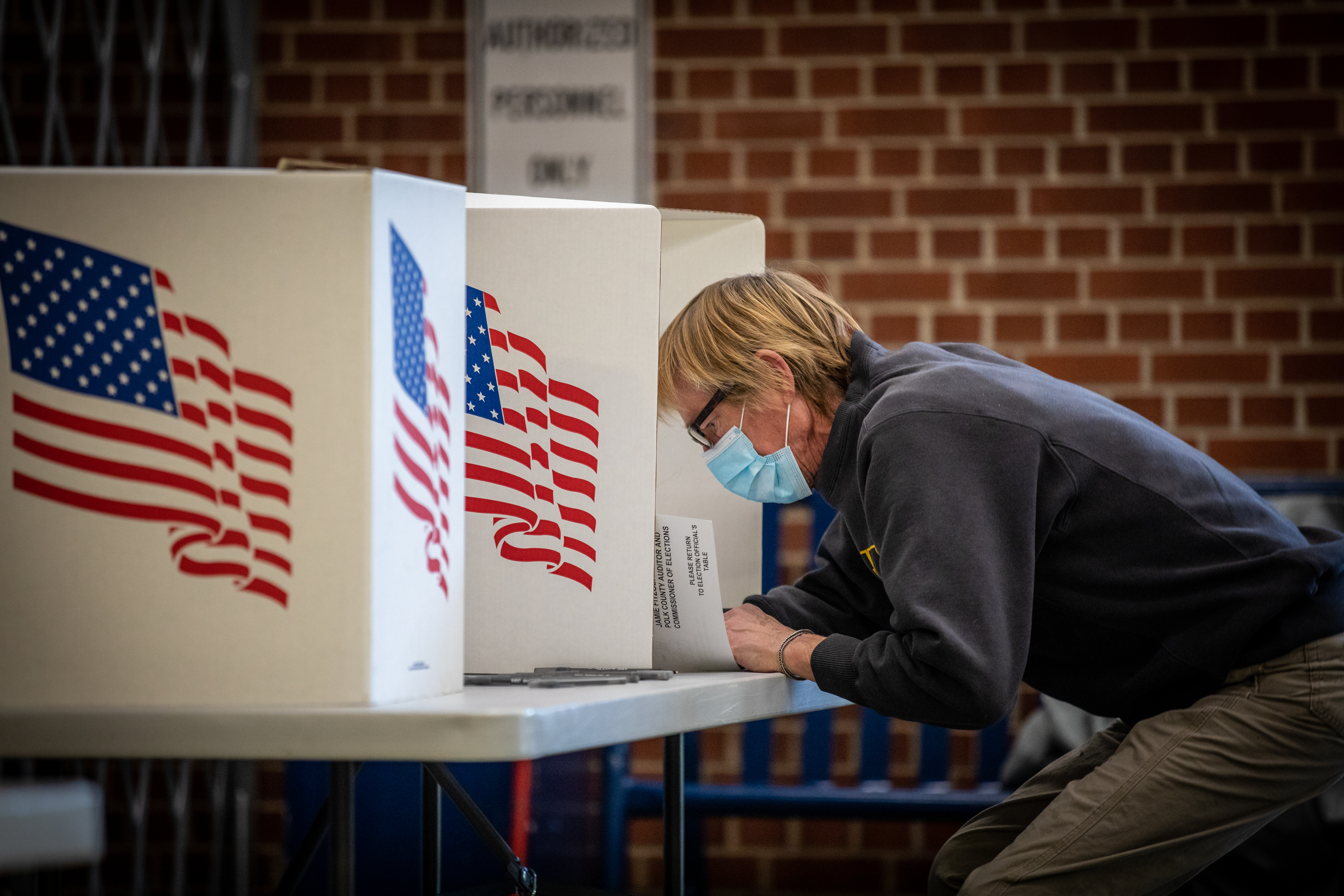
A masked voter casts a ballot at Roosevelt High School in Des Moines, Iowa.

On 11 March 2020, the Michigan Democratic Party cancelled its state convention which was scheduled for 21 March. The Utah Republican and Democratic parties cancelled their in-person state conventions and the United Utah replaced their caucuses and conventions with virtual meetings.

On 16 March, Texas Governor Greg Abbott announced the postponement of the Texas state Senate District 14 special election from 2 May to 14 July. On 20 March, the North Carolina State Board of Elections announced that the Republican primary runoff for North Carolina's 11th Congressional district would be delayed to 23 June and Mississippi Governor Tate Reeves announced that the Republican primary runoff for the 2nd congressional district would be postponed to 23 June. On 23 March, special elections for the Massachusetts House of Representatives and Senate were postponed.

On 15 March, South Carolina Governor Henry McMaster delayed all county and municipal elections in March and April to after 1 May. On 18 March, Alabama Governor Kay Ivey delayed the state's primary runoffs from 31 March to 14 July, Missouri Governor Mike Parson delayed local elections from 7 April to 2 June, and Secretary of State Paul Ziriax announced that municipalities could reschedule elections from 7 April to a late date. On 24 March, Secretary of State Barbara Cegavske and Nevada's seventeen county election officials announced that Nevada's June primaries would be conducted entirely through mail-in ballots. Secretary of State Paul Pate increased the absentee voting period for Iowa's June primaries and also postponed special elections in three counties.

====== Wisconsin ======
In Wisconsin, a swing state with a Democratic governor and a Republican legislature, a 7 April election for a state Supreme Court seat, the federal presidential primaries for both the Democratic and Republican parties, and several other judicial and local elections went ahead as scheduled. Due to the pandemic, at least fifteen other U.S. states cancelled or postponed scheduled elections or primaries at the time of Wisconsin's election. With Wisconsin grappling with their own pandemic, state Democratic lawmakers made several attempts to postpone their election, but were prevented by other Republican legislators. Governor Tony Evers called the Wisconsin legislature into a 4 April special session, but the Republican-controlled Assembly and Senate graveled their sessions in and out within seventeen seconds. In a joint statement afterwards, Wisconsin's state Assembly Speaker Robin Vos and Senate Majority Leader Scott Fitzgerald criticized Evers for attempting to postpone the election, for not calling a special session earlier, and for reversing his previous position on keeping the election date intact.

On 6 April, Evers attempted to move the election by an executive order, but was blocked by the Wisconsin Supreme Court. On the same day, a separate effort to extend the deadline for mailing absentee ballots was blocked by the Supreme Court of the United States. The only major concession achieved was that absentee ballots postmarked by 7 April at 8 p.m. would be accepted until 13 April. However, local media outlets reported that many voters had not received their requested absentee ballots by election day or, due to social distancing, were unable to satisfy a legal requirement that they obtain a witness' signature.

Lawmakers' decision to not delay the election was sharply criticized by the editorial board of the local Milwaukee Journal-Sentinel, which had previously endorsed the Republican former governor Scott Walker. They called the election "the most undemocratic in the state's history." The New York Times characterized the election as "almost certain to be tarred as illegitimate," adding that the inability of the state's lawmakers to come to an agreement on moving the election was "an epic and predictable failure." The newspaper placed the political maneuvering as part of another chapter in "a decade of bitter partisan wrangling that saw [state Republicans] clinically attack and defang the state's Democratic institutions, starting with organized labor and continuing with voting laws making it far harder for poor and black residents of urban areas to vote." Republicans believed that holding the election on 7 April, when Democratic-leaning urban areas were hard-hit by the pandemic, would help secure them political advantages like a continued 5–2 conservative majority on the Wisconsin Supreme Court (through the elected seat of Daniel Kelly).

When the election went ahead on 7 April, access to easy in-person voting heavily depended on where voters were located. In smaller or more rural communities, which tend to be whiter and vote Republican, few issues were reported. In more urbanized areas, the pandemic forced the closure and consolidation of many polling places around the state despite the use of 2,500 National Guard members to combat a severe shortage in poll workers. The effects were felt most heavily in Milwaukee, the state's largest city with the largest minority population and the center of the state's ongoing pandemic. The city's government was only able to open 5 of 180 polling stations after being short by nearly 1,000 poll workers. As a result, lengthy lines were reported, with some voters waiting for up to 2.5 hours and through rain showers. The lines disproportionately affected Milwaukee's large Hispanic and African-American population; the latter had already been disproportionately afflicted with the pandemic, forming nearly half of Wisconsin's documented cases and over half its deaths at the time the vote was conducted. However, by the time the election concluded, Milwaukee Election Commissioner Neil Albrecht said that despite some of the problems, the in-person voting ran smoothly.

Similar problems with poll station closures and long lines were reported in Waukesha, where only one polling station was opened for a city of 70,000, and Green Bay, where only 17 poll workers out of 270 were able to work. Other cities were able to keep lines much shorter, including the state capital of Madison, which opened about two-thirds of its usual polling locations, and Appleton, which opened all of its usual 15.

Voters across the state were advised to maintain social distancing, wear face masks, and bring their own pens. Vos, the state Assembly Speaker, served as an election inspector for in-person voting on 7 April. While wearing medical-like personal protective equipment, he told reporters that it was "incredibly safe to go out" and vote, adding that voters faced "minimal exposure."

=== Venezuela ===
The Committee of Electoral Candidacies, in charge of appointing a new National Electoral Council of Venezuela (CNE), announced that it would suspend its meetings until further notice because of the pandemic.

== See also ==
- List of COVID-19 pandemic legislation
- Impact of the COVID-19 pandemic on religion
- Impact of the COVID-19 pandemic on education
- Impact of the COVID-19 pandemic on science and technology
- Impact of the COVID-19 pandemic on television
- Protests over responses to the COVID-19 pandemic
