= 2020–2021 Argentine protests =

Protests in Argentina

2020 Argentine protests
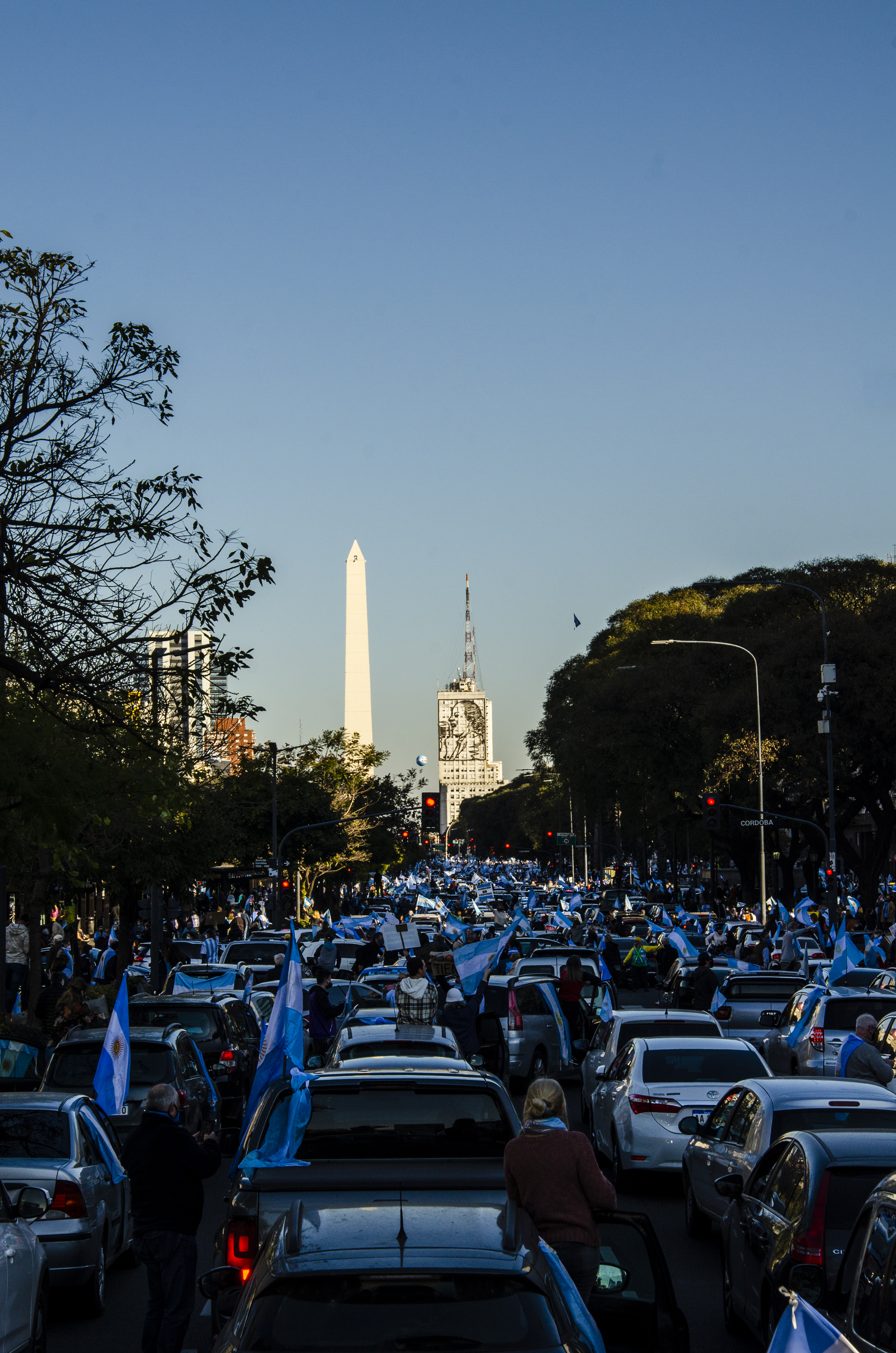
- Date: 2020 – 2021
- Location: Argentina (Buenos Aires, Córdoba, Santa Fe, Mendoza, etc)
- Caused by: Alleged increasing democratic backsliding; Government corruption and impunity; Dissatisfaction with the government's response to the COVID-19 pandemic; Increase in crime, violence and classism; Increase in state pensions and sharp decrease in spending on social services
- Goals: Maintenance of the separation of powers and defense of the institutions; More freedom of movement; Resignation of president Alberto Fernández and Minister of Health Ginés González García
- Methods: demonstrations, civil disobedience, online activism, protest march, car marches
- Result: On 18 September, president Alberto Fernández announced less restrictions; Increased political social division; President’s lowest popularity ever, with 65% of disapproval; Progressive rise of cases
- Concessions: Less restrictive social distancing since September; Government refuses to resign

Parties
Government of Argentina; Pro-government parties; Frente de Todos; Kirchnerist faction of the Justicialist Party; Ministry of Health	(Argentina) Opposition; Protesters; Anti-Kirchnerist parties; Juntos por el Cambio; Menemist faction of the Justicialist Party

Lead figures
Alberto Fernández (President of Argentina); Cristina Kirchner; Ginés González García; José Mayans	Mauricio Macri (Former President of Argentina); Miguel Angel Pichetto; Elisa Carrió; Patricia Bullrich

Number
	Thousands

The 2020 Argentine protests were a series of demonstrations that occurred as of May 2020 in different parts of the country. The reasons were diverse, with the common denominator being dissatisfaction over the successive extensions of the isolation measures adopted to contain the spread of the coronavirus disease. For this reason, some media describe the protests as "antiquarantine." Other slogans expressed opposition to the government, denial of the existence of the pandemic and demands for more freedom, among others. In general, the participants in these protests did so from their vehicles in order to keep their distance from other people, although in some cases the attendees did not comply with the prevention measures established by the authorities.

There were also other marches and mobilizations in various parts of the country in protest for various issues.

== Background ==
The first confirmed case of the COVID-19 pandemic in Argentina was announced on 3 March 2020. On 19 March, President Alberto Fernández ordered the first stage of quarantine, initially until the 31st of the same month. At the time of adopting these measures, the positive image of the president was 72%. A week later, approval was still on the rise and was estimated at 82%. The isolation measures – with differentiation in different parts of the country according to the dynamics of the spread of the virus and the decisions of the local authorities – were extended over the months. The positive image of the president fell to values around 60% in July 2020, and remained practically stable for a time. By mid-October 2020, the approval of the discharge of the health emergency reached only 43%.

== Timeline ==
=== May ===
On 25 May, a small group of people gathered in front of Plaza de Mayo, in the city of Buenos Aires. The call was made through social networks. Those attending the march – some 100 or 200 people according to different sources – expressed their dissatisfaction with the extension of the quarantine, demanded greater freedom, and in some cases adopted denialist positions regarding the existence of the pandemic. The protest included Cacerolazo of a group of people around the Obelisk and in some neighborhoods of the city.

=== June ===
On 6 June, a small group of people gathered in the vicinity of the Obelisk. Most of the attendees demanded the implementation of protocols that would allow the reopening of shops, gyms, and other activities. Other heterogeneous slogans were added to this claim, such as the rejection of a supposed "new world order", and a claim "for freedom", among others. On 20 June there was a demonstration called #BanderazoNacional.Various claims were added to the usual slogans such as "promoting the Republic" or that the country "does not become Argenzuela". It was called through social networks by opposition leaders, and included caravans of vehicles that circulated in the center of the city of Buenos Aires. The march, which gathered a few hundred people, occurred at a peak in the number of infections registered in the metropolitan area.

=== July ===
On 8 July 2020, former President Mauricio Macri gave an interview to journalist Álvaro Vargas Llosa during which he expressed his criticism of the management of his successor Alberto Fernández and declared himself firmly in favor of "freedoms" that in his opinion were in risk in Argentina. The following day, coinciding with the celebration of Independence Day, a protest march was organized with an epicenter in the city of Buenos Aires and replicas in some parts of the country. The slogans were similar to those of previous protests, with the addition of demands for "freedom of expression" and "defense of private property". The demonstration was generally peaceful, but a group of people attacked CNN journalists who were covering it and damaged the vehicle that was transporting them, without the security forces intervening to preserve order. The march received criticism from various sectors, basically due to the fact that in general the distance between the attendees was not respected and many of them did not wear masks or chinstraps. About two weeks later, spikes of confirmed infections were registered in the country, which was interpreted as the consequence of the 9 July demonstrations.

=== August ===
On 1 August, a group of about 300 protesters gathered in the center of the city of Buenos Aires. The call was made through social networks under the hashtag "1AYoVoy", with the aim of expressing the rejection of a reform project — presented by the national executive and not yet discussed in the National Congress — centered on federal justice.

On 17 August, the demonstration called 17A took place, in protest against the extension of the self-isolation measures, the judicial reform project, and in general against the national government. Some representatives of the opposition Juntos por el Cambio, as the president of PRO Patricia Bullrich, the actor and former radical deputy Luis Brandoni and the former minister Hernán Lombardi. Other politicians from the same alliance such as the head and deputy head of the Government of the City of Buenos Aires, Horacio Rodríguez Larreta and Diego Santilli respectively, and the Minister of Health of the same district Fernán Quirós did not attend and expressed their disagreement with the meeting. The mobilisation was generally peaceful, except for some attendees who broke the mobile of the CNN channel, in a similar way to what happened in the mobilization on 9 July 2020.

On the afternoon of 26 August, a group of people gathered in front of the Palace of Congress in rejection of the judicial reform whose treatment was scheduled for 27 August. The convocation proposed holding a kind of vigil and then a symbolic hug to the Parliament. About 500 people attended the march. Days later, while the work of the parliamentary committees continued prior to the treatment of the project, a small group of people tried to force entry into Congress, and a protester armed was arrested.

=== September ===
Between the night of 1 and 2 September, protesters turned up late at night in discontent over the virtual session where deputies from Juntos por el Cambio who attended the Congress in person were "absent". It lasted until after 4 in the morning on 2 September with hundreds of protesters outside Congress; It was also attended by the actor and musician Alfredo Casero. On 13 September, protests were held in various parts of the country. With its epicenter in the center of the city of Buenos Aires, the convocation achieved little support.

On 19 September, new demonstrations were held in various parts of the country, such as La Plata, Córdoba, and San Miguel de Tucumán, among others. On this date, demonstrations were also held abroad, such as at the Argentine embassy in France. On 28 September, some 15,000 people demonstrated near the town of Palpalá, Jujuy province, demanding justice for the femicides committed in the province in the previous weeks.

=== October ===
On 12 October, a new mobilization took place that had the participation of opposition leaders, and was replicated in several cities such as Mendoza, Córdoba and Tucumán. The handling of the pandemic, the supposed official interference in Justice and the direction of the economy inspired the main slogans. It generated controversy due to several attacks on the press and violence against different journalists who covered the news, including death threats against journalists and beatings.

=== November ===
On 8 November, a new demonstration took place in different parts of the country and, unlike the previous ones, a holiday was not chosen. The slogans were, among others, the independence of powers, respect for the Constitution, security and the economic situation.

== See also ==
- December 2001 riots in Argentina
- Protests over responses to the COVID-19 pandemic
