= Menemism =

Political policies of Carlos Menem

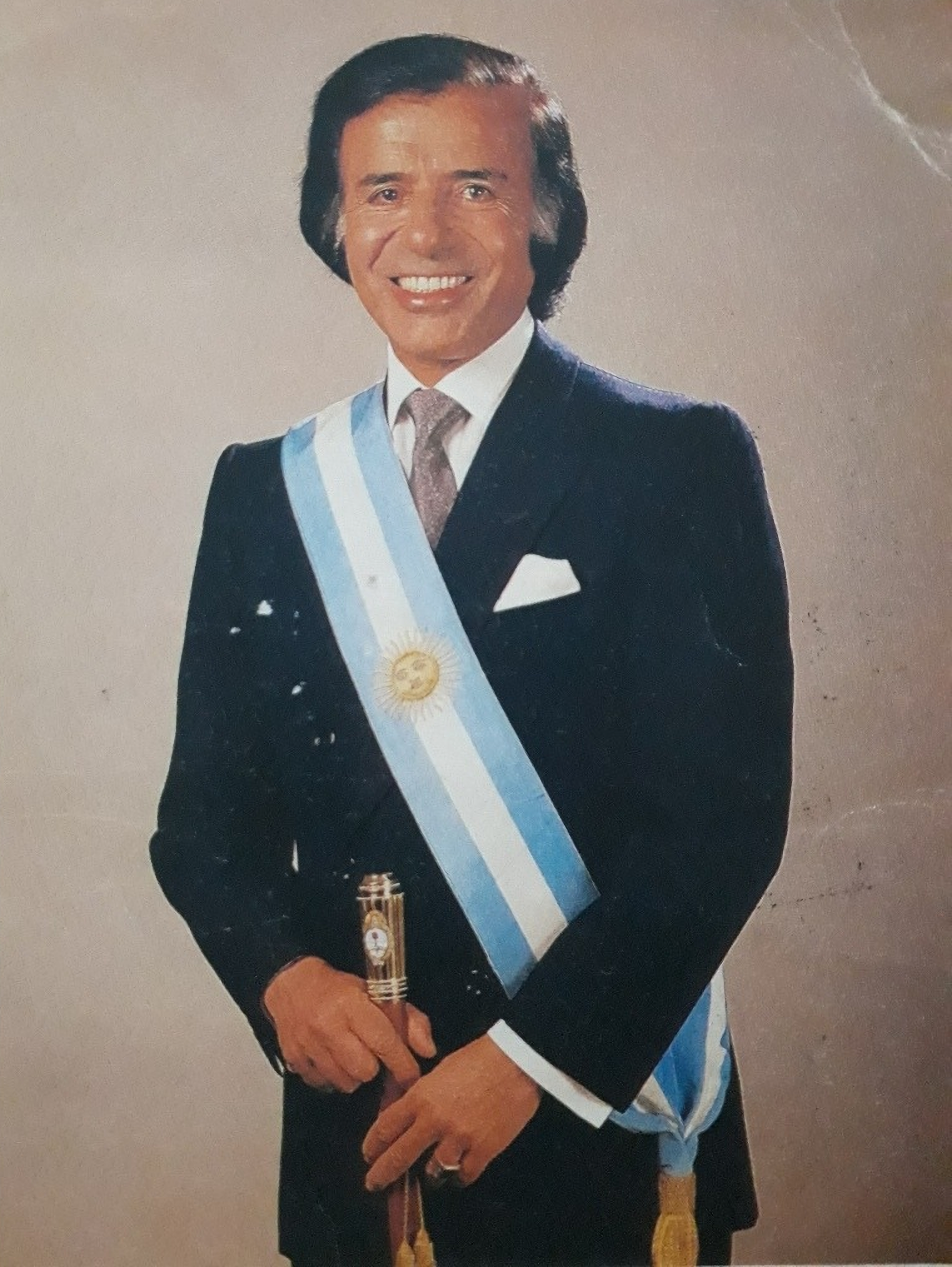
Official portrait of President Carlos Menem

Menemism is a term that refers to the policies implemented in Argentina by Carlos Menem, president of the country from 1989 to 1999. Like Peronism (the movement Menem belonged to), Menemism is complex, being most usually defined as populist in rhetoric and neoliberal in policy. Other sources describe it as a mix of various more ideologies.

Menem came to power with the Popular Unity Justicialista Front. He is remembered for the electoral platform with which he won the elections; his measures included a "salariazo" and "productive revolution." He won the elections with other sectors of Peronism or center-left radicalism.

Menemism remained in power with a resoundingly high vote rate, having modified the national constitution, so that the government mandates would last four years, making it possible for Menem to be re-elected. The recurring problems of this economic model caused an economic recession from 1998, which would end up exploding in the 2001 crisis.

== Ideology ==
Menemism constituted a political-cultural period of consensus around neoliberalism, with policies such as convertibility, the privatization of companies, economic liberalism, where the economy was deregulated, reducing quotas, tariffs and import prohibitions. Menemism was opposed mainly by the national-popular sectors of Peronism that branded Menem a "traitor". To relate to these sectors, Menem attempted to show continuity between Menemism and Peronism, tracing Peronist policies to open up to foreign capital in 1952 with the liberal policies that the Menemist government was carrying out.

Menemism was qualified in various ways around its position in the political spectrum, the most common is the center-right or the right-wing. Menemism is considered conservative by most sectors, although in their governments there were not too many cultural or social policies where it was clearly represented.

== Political program ==
=== Economic model ===
Menem adhered to the policies of economist John Williamson, who proposed a set of ten specific formulas for developing countries affected by macroeconomic crises, such as tax packages, trade and labor reforms to stabilize prices, attracting foreign investment; reducing the size of the state, and encouraging the expansion of internal market forces. Greater opening of the economy implied the entry of financial and productive capital and the entry of goods that compete with national products. This measure once again caused the closure of factories and workshops.

=== Convertibility plan ===
By law, the national currency was set at parity with the US dollar. As a consequence, the cost of national production increased and businessmen could not compete with imports. Therefore, production fell and unemployment rose.

=== Privatizations ===
Through Law No. 23,696, better known as the State Reform Law, Menem implemented a series of massive privatizations of state-owned companies to generate a more liberal economy. Menem put the following state companies up for sale: YPF, YCF, Gas del Estado, the National Telecommunications Company, Aerolíneas Argentinas, the Port, the national retirement and pension system, among others. This translated into strategic relations with the United States and Great Britain, which were applauded by conservative leaders of the moment such as Ronald Reagan and Margaret Thatcher.

=== Decrease in public spending ===
The decrease in public spending under Menemism was one of the conditions imposed by the International Monetary Fund (IMF) to grant credit to the country and sustain the convertibility regime. Public spending went from representing 35.6% of GDP in 1989 to only 18.3% in 1992. This reduction was achieved mainly through the privatization or concession of public companies and services. The decrease in public spending also affected areas sensitive areas such as education, health, defense and security. The budget allocated to these areas was reduced or transferred to the provinces, which had to take charge of financing them with their own resources or with debt. The consequence was a deterioration in the quality and coverage of these services, as well as a loss of public jobs and social rights. Its objective was to achieve a fiscal balance and avoid the monetary issue that generated inflation. However, it also had negative effects on the productive development, employment, income distribution and well-being of the population.

=== International alignment ===
Menem's economy ministers were prominent academics and privileged relations with the United States. However, there were differences between the management of Domingo Cavallo and that of Guido di Tella. While Cavallo tried to maintain differences without diplomatic pressure from the United States, Di Tella did not hesitate to adopt a policy of exclusive attention to that country, called "carnal relations." In 1996 changes were observed in this strategy that could mean the abandonment of this policy.

== Legacy ==
Currently there are various politicians who are usually considered by the political scene as menemistas or vindicators of it. These include Mauricio Macri, Javier Milei, Miguel Ángel Pichetto or Patricia Bullrich.

Some parties that are considered menemists are, for example, Encuentro Republicano Federal.
