= Virtual House of Commons =

Series of measures to mitigate coronavirus in the UK Parliament

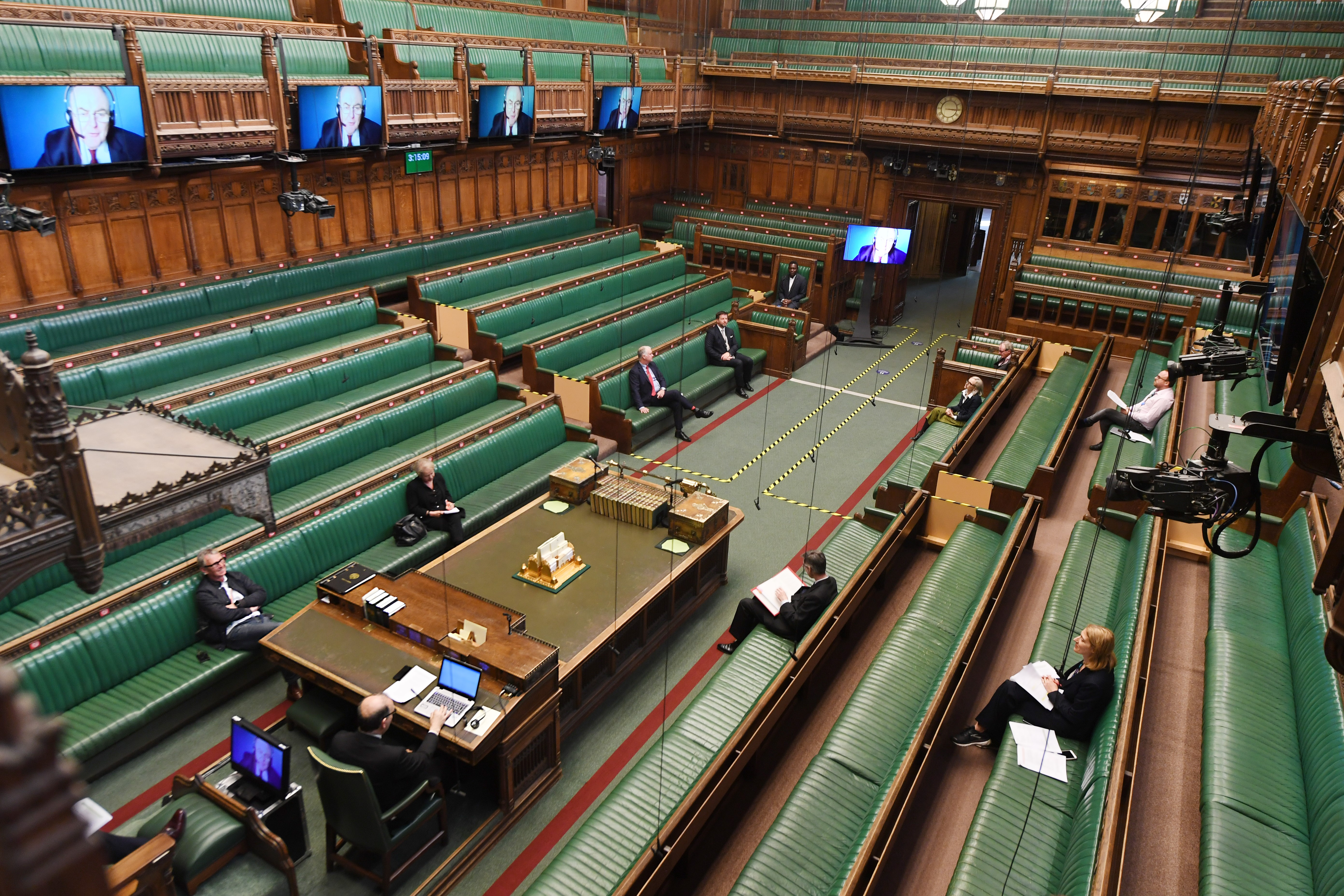
House leaders rehearse hybrid procedures, 20 April

The Virtual House of Commons is a name given to a series of measures involving the United Kingdom's House of Commons, including the use of video-conferencing and the practising of social distancing. The measures were announced in April 2020 to help stop the spread of coronavirus during the ongoing pandemic.

== Background ==
There were worries that the spread of COVID-19 would be accelerated by the number of people working in the Parliamentary Estate, including 650 Members of Parliament, around 800 peers and over 3,000 members of staff. In addition, some of these members and staff have underlying health conditions, and many (especially peers) are over 70 years of age, putting them at higher risk according to the government's advice. This posed a challenge, as – by law – votes, debates and meetings in Parliament must take place in person.

Coronavirus had already interrupted the work of Parliament, after some MPs and staff caught the virus and were forced to self isolate. Because of this, the Houses of Parliament were closed to visitors on 17 March. Some select committees had started to hold meetings behind closed doors, and limits on questions and the number of members allowed in the House of Commons chamber began to be introduced.

After COVID-19 lockdowns were announced by UK Prime Minister Boris Johnson on 23 March, the House of Commons passed through emergency legislation designed to combat COVID-19, including measures such as the power to close non-essential businesses, restrict public events, and detain anyone judged to pose a risk of spreading the virus. The bill passed through the Commons on 23 March, before being sent to the House of Lords on 24 March and gaining royal assent on 25 March.

After the emergency measures bill was passed, the Leader of the House of Commons, Jacob Rees-Mogg presented a motion stating that Parliament would break early for Easter recess on 25 March, and not reopen until 21 April.

== Preparation ==
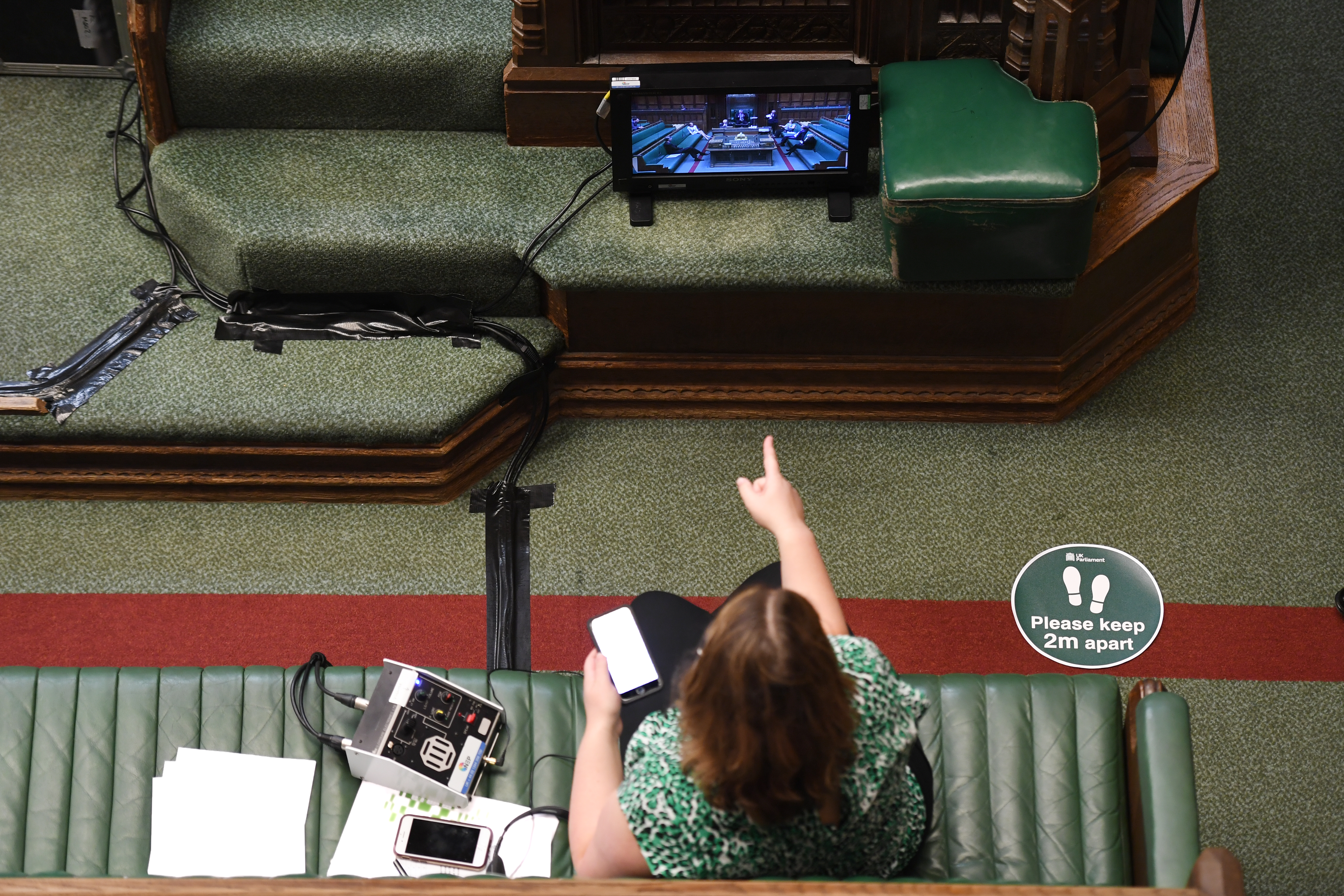
A video screen in the House of Commons

Many possibilities of what could be changed after recess were discussed. Options included:

- Postponing non-essential business
- Taking more votes orally, without the need to call a division
- Letting MPs ask questions via a proxy
- Reducing the number of MPs legally required to be present in order for votes to take place.

There was even speculation that Parliament would be shut down for longer than the agreed Easter recess.

Some Members of Parliament, including the Liberal Democrats' acting leader Ed Davey, were unhappy that they did not have a mechanism to scrutinise the government's response to the pandemic during recess. One hundred opposition MPs later wrote a letter to the Clerk of the House of Commons John Benger to seek support in establishing a virtual parliament.

The Speaker of the House of Commons, Lindsay Hoyle, had suggested extending divisions to 40 minutes to allow MPs to vote in smaller groups, and the parties had already agreed to limit the number of divisions that were called on legislation. The chair of the House of Commons Procedure Committee, Karen Bradley, wrote a letter to Hoyle stating that delaying or reducing divisions was unsustainable, and that the members of her committee were worried that MPs would be less able to express their opinions.

During the recess, the House of Commons digital services team had been working to implement technology to enable sittings to take place virtually, and on 16 April the House of Commons Commission announced that the House of Commons would move to 'hybrid proceedings', with provision for up to 50 MPs in the House of Commons chamber and a further 120 contributing remotely via Zoom, a video-conferencing facility.

== Implementation ==
Procedure Committee Report for the remote participation

Parliament resumed on 21 April, with a limited number of MPs attending in person to pass the legislation to implement the new system.

The Commons chamber was fitted with TV screens to enable sitting members to view those attending virtually, and party whips discouraged MPs from attending in person. The hybrid set-up only includes statements, urgent questions and Prime Minister's Questions, but the House of Commons Commission said that the system would be extended to debates should the system "be judged satisfactory and sustainable". In May 2020, this was extended to include remote voting.

Lindsay Hoyle has said that the measures would only be temporary, despite some pressure to reform the House of Commons' procedures. He also stated that members should dress appropriately and be aware of their surroundings when participating online.

On Wednesday 22 April 2020, the House of Commons sat virtually for the first time in its 700-year history. Leader of the Opposition Keir Starmer made his debut at Prime Minister's Questions, against Dominic Raab, who was deputising for the Prime Minister. MPs who were in the chamber had to conform to strict social distancing measures, including sitting at least 2 metres apart. Other MPs were able to phone in from home, despite some technical issues. The former Scottish Secretary David Mundell was "unable to connect", and Conservative backbencher Peter Bone was muted when he lost connection.

Some security concerns were raised about the use of Zoom, but the House of Commons Commission said that they had been advised by the National Cyber Security Centre that Zoom would be appropriate “if the installation and the use of the service is carefully managed”.

MPs later voted to implement remote voting technology, despite issues relating to verification and security. Speaker Lindsay Hoyle stressed that the measures would be temporary, but the SNP's Tommy Sheppard suggested that it should be used as part of a move to fully-virtual sittings. MPs trialled the technology by participating in mock votes, including questions such as "That this house prefers Spring to Autumn". After the proposals were endorsed by the Procedure Committee, the first virtual vote took place on 11 May 2020, to pass a motion to renew the hybrid proceeding measures.

This was followed the next day by a vote on an amendment to the Agriculture Bill, where a number of MPs voted against the bill by mistake, including the Chancellor of the Exchequer Rishi Sunak. This led Labour's Shadow Environment Secretary Luke Pollard to ask the government's deputy chief whip Stuart Andrew "How many members of the Cabinet voted the wrong way?", to which Andrew replied: "Just the one. He's a very busy man".

== Suspension and return to physical proceedings ==
On 12 May, Leader of the House of Commons Jacob Rees-Mogg announced that the House of Commons would move back to meeting in person "as quickly as possible" after the Whitsun recess on 2 June. He stated that MPs should "set an example" and return to working in Westminster, as the government had recently announced that certain groups of people may restart work from 13 May. This was met with widespread anger from opposition parties, with a Labour spokesperson stating that it contravened the government's own public health advice, as the message was still to work from home if possible. In addition, it was pointed out that MPs from Scotland, Wales and Northern Ireland would be contravening rules set out by their respective devolved governments, which require the public to stay at home; and even if the law changed, it would be very difficult to get to London due to the geographical distance and lack of transport services. Despite this, Scottish Secretary Alister Jack said that he would travel down from his Dumfries and Galloway constituency to take departmental questions, stating that his position as a key worker allowed him to do so, and that the Palace of Westminster was being made "Covid-safe". The government later defended its decision, stating that the measures were only ever intended to be temporary; and the current arrangements did not allow for sufficient scrutiny, nor did they allow for the government to progress its legislative programme.

The next day, Speaker Lindsay Hoyle put the government's hopes of reintroducing physical sittings into doubt, when he told MPs that he would suspend sittings if social distancing were not adhered to. He also said that voting would take longer if it had to take place in person, in some cases up to an hour. This was welcomed by some opposition MPs, who pointed out that the government was only intending to reopen parliament in order for backbench MPs to support Johnson at Prime Minister's Questions, as he was seen by many to be struggling without a supportive crowd.

=== Return to Westminster ===
Despite Hoyle's warning, the government pressed ahead with its plans to reinstate fully-physical proceedings. On 2 June 2020, MPs returned to the Commons to vote on the suspension of hybrid proceedings. Due to Public Health England's advice that the division lobbies normally used for voting were unsafe, MPs had to form a kilometre-long queue (dubbed the 'Mogg Conga' by Labour whip Nick Brown) around the Parliamentary Estate to maintain social distancing, before casting their vote in the Commons chamber. The first vote, on an amendment tabled by Procedure Committee chair Karen Bradley took 44 minutes to complete (around three times longer than normal), and ended in victory for the government. Despite widespread opposition from MPs, the government won the vote. Prime Minister Boris Johnson defended the strategy, stating that the public were doing the same when they went shopping.

Critics of this plan, including the Equality and Human Rights Commission, said that it would risk disenfranchising MPs who were shielding from Coronavirus due to health or old age, as they could not travel to London to attend in person. The next day Johnson confirmed that MPs unable to attend for 'medical reasons' could elect a proxy to vote on their behalf, but would not be allowed to vote virtually. Concerns were also raised about the safety of Black, Asian and Minority Ethnic MPs, who are twice as likely to die from COVID-19 than white people. MPs representing constituencies in the Scottish Highlands and Northern Ireland also complained of the travel times of up to 18 hours required to reach London due to flight restrictions.

The Public and Commercial Services Union, who represent many parliamentary staff, later stated that they were considering balloting members for industrial action, due to numerous complaints about unsafe working conditions.

Calls were renewed for the virtual proceedings to be re-instated when Business Secretary Alok Sharma fell ill with suspected COVID-19 after giving a statement to the Commons on 3 June 2020. Sharma had earlier that day been in close contact with Johnson, as well as Chancellor Rishi Sunak and Shadow Business Secretary Ed Miliband, the latter having passed a glass of water to Sharma during the statement. He later tested negative for the virus.

== Elsewhere ==
=== Within the United Kingdom ===
==== Select committees ====
Parliamentary select committees used video-conferencing as well, with most members phoning-in from home.

==== House of Lords ====
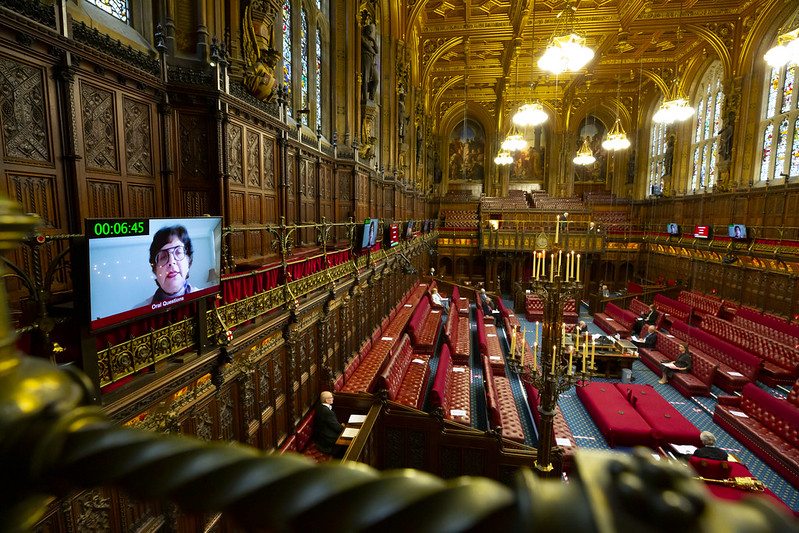
The Lords Chamber with hybrid measures in place

The House of Lords also made a move to semi-virtual proceedings, starting with oral questions and statements. Peers used Microsoft Teams to participate (as opposed to Zoom, which was used by the Commons), although the first two sessions were held in private. There was also discussion about whether peers would receive their normal expenses for working from home, one option being that they are paid half-rate, which is what they currently receive for work away from the Palace of Westminster.

==== Devolved parliaments ====
The National Assembly for Wales was the first legislature to introduce virtual sessions, with the first meeting taking place on 1 April, including statements from ministers and questioning from senior opposition figures. The following week a representative sample of 28 AMs, around half of the total number of members, were able to take part and (for the first time) vote, thanks to the implementation of an electronic voting system. Welsh health minister Vaughan Gething faced criticism and calls to resign after he swore at colleague Jenny Rathbone while taking part in a virtual meeting.

The Scottish Parliament conducted First Minister's Questions online, with questions being asked by the leaders of the four opposition parties. After this was deemed successful by Presiding Officer Ken Macintosh, the sessions were expanded to include the quizzing of other ministers, with questions being asked by a selection of 19 MSPs, to provide a party balance similar to the full parliament. The reforms have been popular with several rural representatives, with Caithness, Sutherland and Ross MSP Gail Ross saying that she might reconsider her decision to leave the house at the next election if the virtual proceedings were continued.

=== In foreign legislatures ===
Many parliaments across the world closed to outsiders and asked non-essential staff to work from home where possible, including in France and the Netherlands, while others used thermal imaging to detect infected individuals on entry to parliamentary buildings. Committees of members were suspended or moved online, although some (such as the United States Congress) lacked the technology for electronic voting.

Some parliaments closed completely for a time, such as in Canada, while others reduced the number of representatives present (examples include Ireland, Germany and New Zealand). Meanwhile, Hungary took extreme measures, allowing Prime Minister Viktor Orbán to rule the country without consulting MPs.

== See also ==
- COVID-19 pandemic in the United Kingdom
- 2020 in United Kingdom politics and government
- Coronavirus Act 2020
- House of Commons of the United Kingdom
