= Argentina Independence Day =

Public holiday in Argentina

Independence Day of the Argentine Republic Día de la Independencia de la República Argentina
- Date: July 9th
- Begins: 9 July 1816
- Country: Argentina

The Independence Day of the Argentine Republic (Spanish: Día de la Independencia de la República Argentina) is celebrated every year on July 9. This date originates in commemoration of the signing of the Argentine Declaration of Independence, on Tuesday, July 9, 1816, in the house of Francisca Bazán de Laguna. In 1941, the building was declared a National heritage site. The decision to become independent was taken by the Congress of Tucumán, which chose the city of San Miguel de Tucumán from the United Provinces of the Río de la Plata, which proclaimed the political independence of the country from the Spanish Monarchy and also renounced all foreign domination.

== First Historic Celebrations ==
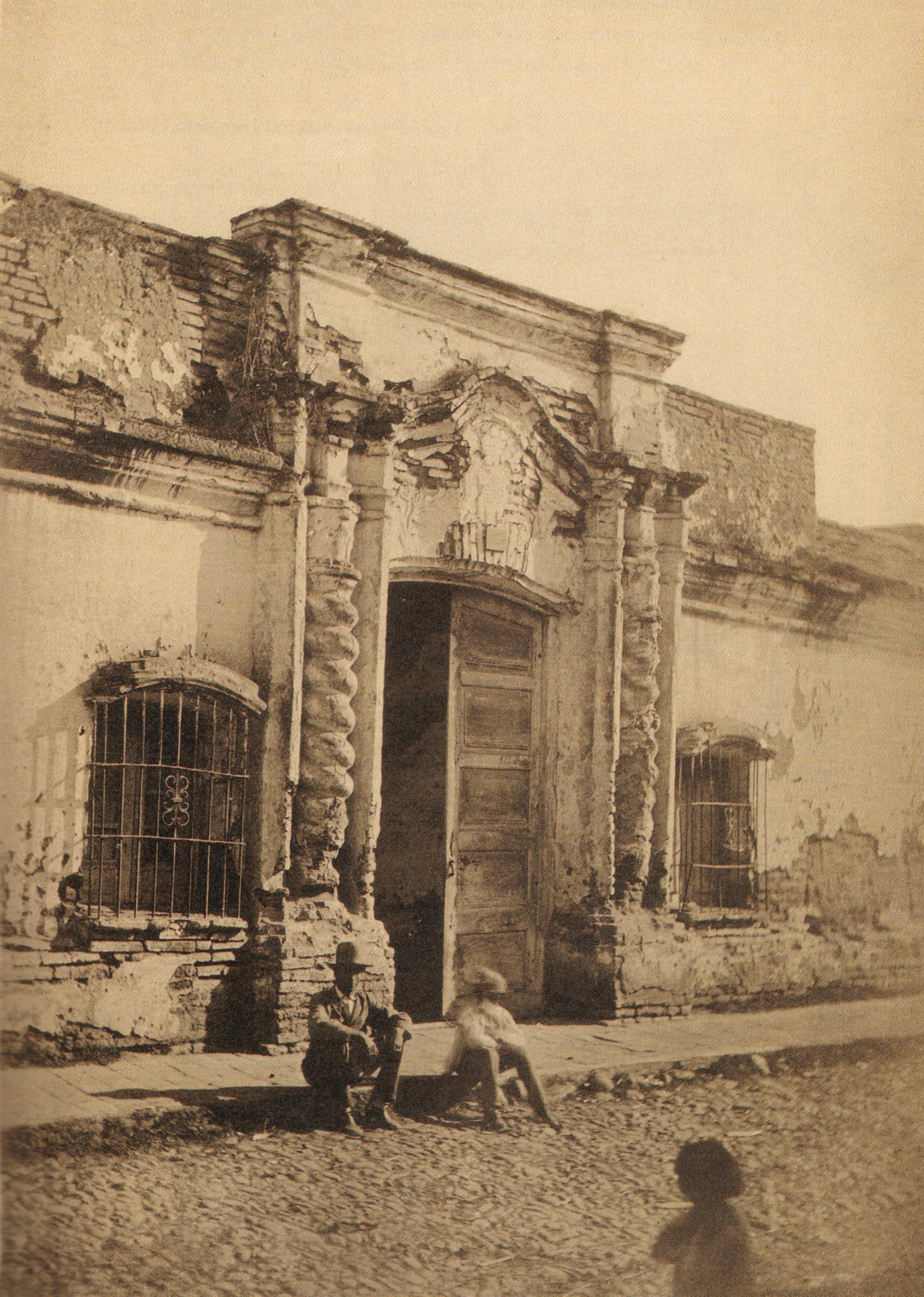
La Casa de Tucumán, owned by Doña Francisca Bazán de Laguna, where independence was declared and where the first celebration of that day took place.

After the signing of the Declaration of Independence, and according to General Lamadrid, it was proposed to hold a party to celebrate the event; this would take place on the evening of the following day, 10 July, in the courtyard of the same house of the hostess, Doña Francisca Bazán de Laguna.

Nevertheless, it was on 9 July 1816 that the people of San Miguel de Tucumán celebrated the event with great fanfare on the outskirts of the city, where more than five thousand people attended.

== First Centenary ==
At the beginning of the 20th century, the centenary of independence was celebrated in almost all Latin American countries, in Argentina in 1916. However, the crisis of 1890, which had slowed national growth, created political and economic tensions within a country struggling with the crisis of the early 20th century while receiving a flood of immigrants from Europe.

The national state programmed the celebrations as a great spectacle in a country where cattle and crops were the source of its wealth but, as historian Luis Alberto Romero says: "Beyond the pomp of the celebration, a deep concern for the direction of the nation invaded the reflective spirits, won over by a growing pessimism". In this way the centenary celebration made the conflicts visible by placing them in the public space, where they could no longer be masked.

In this way, the nation prepares the celebrations from the point of view of a class that is established in the territory, which contrasts with the migratory and indigenous reality, thus revealing the confrontation of the nation as a political project with its limits: Indians and immigrants within a nation conceived by whites.

== Second Centenary ==
In 2016, the bicentenary of Argentina's independence was celebrated, for which various preparations were made throughout the country. One of these was the refurbishment and enhancement of the Casa de Tucumán.

It was also for this reason that the Episcopal Conference of Argentina (EAC) chose San Miguel de Tucumán that year as the venue for the International Eucharistic Congress, at which it was requested that Pope Francis would preside if he were to visit the country. In the end, this did not happen.

== Onomastic ==
Throughout time, several places, streets, ships, bonds and companies took the name of "9 de Julio" in honour of the national date, such is the case of the July 9 Avenue in the city of Buenos Aires, July 9 in the city of Resistencia and July 9 in the city of Formosa, two cruisers of the Argentine Navy, the football team Club Atlético 9 de Julio in the city of Rafaela or the town of Nueve de Julio in the province of Buenos Aires, town of July 9 Corrientes, among others.

== See also ==
- Argentine War of Independence
