= 2016–2017 Brazilian protests =

Brazilian demonstrations in 2016 and 2017

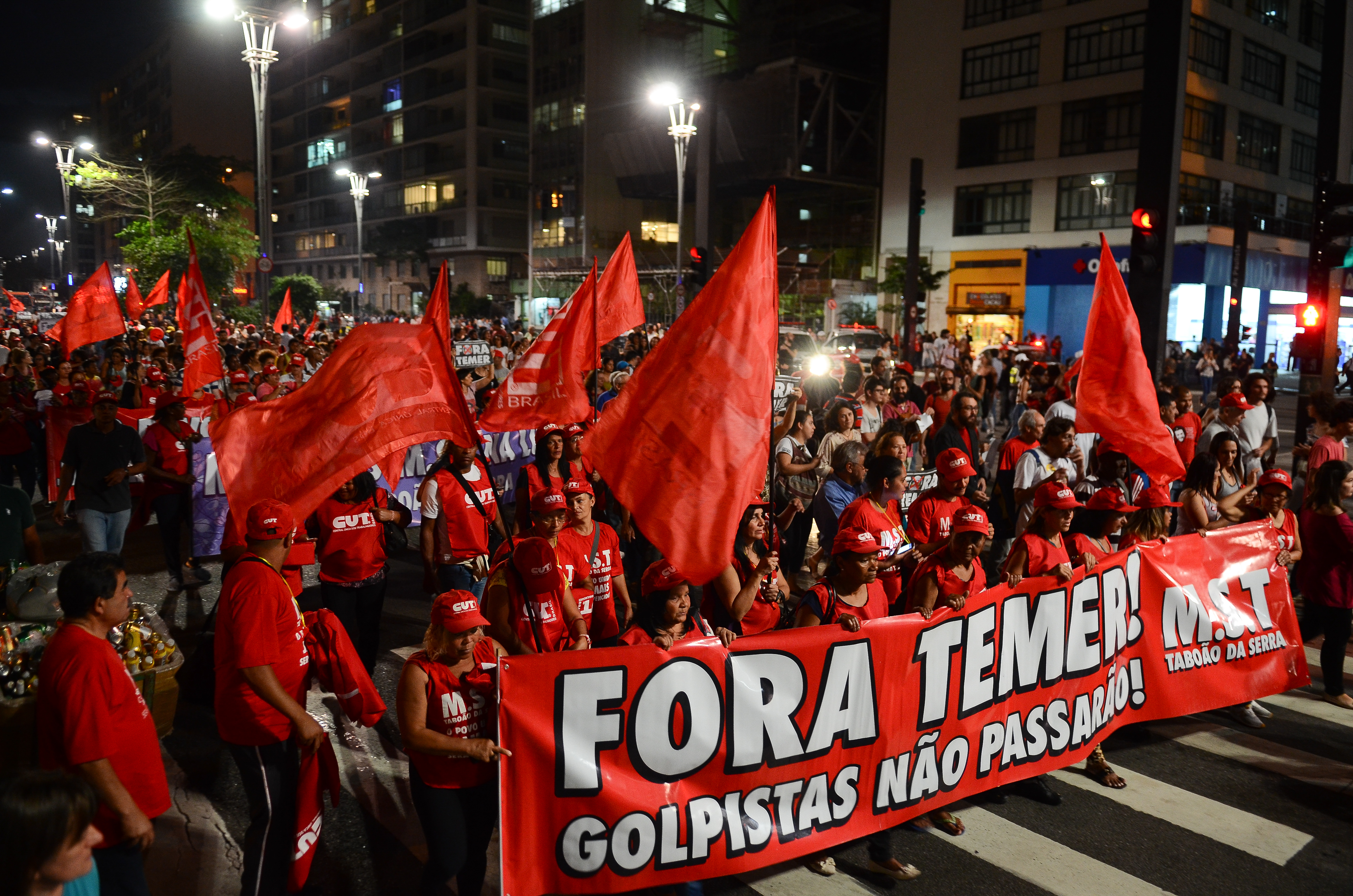
- Demonstration against Michel Temer on Paulista Avenue.
- Date: 2016-2017
- Location: Brazil
- Goals: Michel Temer's departure; Dilma Rousseff's impeachment annulled; Early and direct presidential election
- Methods: Protest: picketing, demonstrations, strike action, civil resistance, civil disobedience, direct action and internet activism; Civil disorder: street blockades, barricades, riots, vandalism and arson

Parties
Opposition: Indigenous, LGBT, black/antiracist and antifascist activists; Student, police and worker's unions; National Union of Students; Unified Workers' Central; Left-wing movements; Homeless Workers' Movement; Landless Workers' Movement; Centre of People's Movements; Brazil's Popular Front; People Without Fear Front; Popular Youth Uprising; Socialist Youth Union; Brazilian Women's Union; Supported by: Workers' Party; Brazilian Communist Party; United Socialist Workers' Party; Socialism and Liberty Party; Communist Party of Brazil; Democratic Labour Party; Workers' Cause Party; Green Party; Brazilian Socialist Party	(Brazil) Government: Military Police; Riot police; Pro-government counter-protesters

Casualties
- Injuries: 49
- Arrested: 7

The 2016–2017 Brazilian protests were popular demonstrations that took place in different regions of Brazil after Dilma Rousseff's impeachment. The marches were marked by the slogan "Fora Temer" (English: "Temer Out").

== Background ==
After Dilma Rousseff's impeachment, part of the population was dissatisfied with the Temer government, especially due to allegations of corruption among several members of the cabinet. Protesters also claimed that there was insufficient justification to constitute a crime of liability in the impeachment process, since "fiscal pedaling" was common practice in state governments.

Measures by the Temer government, such as planned reductions in public education and health funding, the possibility of charging for public higher education and the reform of labor laws, also motivated the demonstrations. In addition, important ministries such as Culture, Racial Equality, Human Rights and Women's Affairs were abolished and the Amnesty Commission was reduced.

== Demonstrations ==
=== 2016 ===
Since the beginning, the Temer government faced protests. His first interview for Fantástico was greeted by the population with "panelaços" and "apitaços", as well as slogans such as "golpista" ("scammer"), in different parts of Brazil. On 17 May 2016, associations such as the National Union of Students (Portuguese: União Nacional dos Estudantes - UNE), the Popular Youth Uprising (Levante Popular da Juventude), the Socialist Youth Union (União da Juventude Socialista) and the Brazilian Women's Union (União Brasileira de Mulheres) led around 8,000 people to Paulista Avenue in São Paulo to call for Temer's resignation.

In May 2016, as a reaction to the closure of the Ministry of Culture, activists from the sector occupied the agency's headquarters in several states and chanted "Temer Out" along with the Carmina Burana cantata. The Gustavo Capanema Palace in Rio de Janeiro and the Funarte buildings in Belo Horizonte, Brasília and São Paulo were occupied. The movement was supported by artists such as Otto and Arnaldo Antunes, who played concerts at the Capanema Palace. In the same month, Temer reactivated the Ministry of Culture.

On 17 May, during the Cannes Film Festival in France, members of the Aquarius crew, including director Kleber Mendonça Filho and actress Sônia Braga, held signs protesting against Dilma Rousseff's impeachment. On her official Twitter account, Rousseff thanked people for their support.

On 21 May, a group of around sixty protesters occupied the area outside Temer's residence in São Paulo. The following day, the São Paulo Military Police banned access to the site claiming that it was a "presidential security area". On the same day, there was a protest in Rio de Janeiro, where Michel Temer had planned to attend the inauguration of the LRT, but the ceremony was canceled. The 2016 edition of Virada Cultural was characterized by protests against Temer, with screens on the stages displaying the phrases "Temer Out" and "Temer jamais" ("Temer Never").

On 10 June, demonstrations were held across Brazil; in São Paulo, thousands of people gathered in front of the São Paulo Museum of Art (MASP). It was called by the Brazil's Popular Front (Frente Brasil Popular) and the People Without Fear Front (Frente Povo sem Medo) and included movements and trade union centers such as the Unified Workers' Central (Central Única dos Trabalhadores - CUT), the National Union of Students, Brazilian Workers' Central (Central dos Trabalhadores e Trabalhadoras do Brasil - CTB, the Landless Workers' Movement (Movimento dos Trabalhadores Rurais Sem Terra - MST) and the Homeless Workers' Movement (Movimento dos Trabalhadores Sem Teto - MTST). A sound truck was placed for politicians and social leaders to speak, including former president Lula. Besides protesting against the impeachment of Dilma Rousseff, the groups campaigned against the social setbacks of the Temer government, for workers' rights, for democracy and against the pension reform. There was no consensus on the plebiscite for new elections.

In August 2016, Temer was booed at the opening and end of the Olympic Games in Rio de Janeiro. On 7 September, protests occurred in 25 states and the Federal District; the largest demonstration happened in Salvador. On the same day, he was booed at the opening of the Paralympic Games and at the civic parade celebrating Brazil's independence in Brasilia. On 22 September, trade union centrals promoted the National Day of Paralysis and Mobilization of Categories against the proposed reforms in labor and social security legislation in several states. 32 cities registered demonstrations and the actions were supported by the Brazil’s Popular Front and People Without Fear Front movements.

Demonstrations against the PEC on the Public Expenditure Cap were held in several states and in the Federal District on 24 October, 11 November and 25 November 2016, on Paulista Avenue on 27 November 2016, and on the Esplanade of Ministries on 29 November, when the Federal Senate was scheduled to vote on the amendment.

=== 2017 ===
In 2016, Constitutional Amendment no. 287, which requires workers to have at least 25 years of social security contributions and a minimum retirement age of 65, was approved. The reform was implemented by Henrique Meirelles, then Minister of Finance, due to a R$316.5 billion deficit in the social security system.

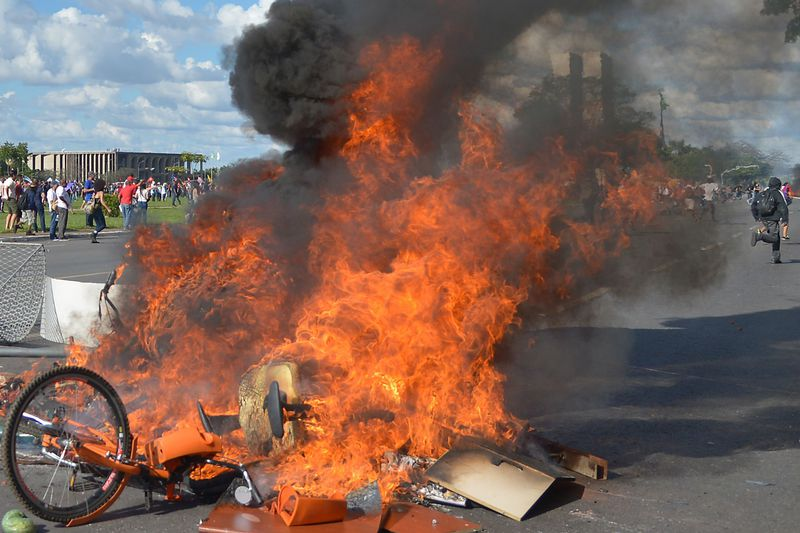
Protesters clashed with the police in Brasilia.

On 15 March 2017, protests occurred in nineteen states and the Federal District against the proposed pension reform sent by the Temer government to the National Congress. They were organized by trade unions and movements such as Unified Workers' Central, National Confederation of Education Workers (Confederação Nacional dos Trabalhadores em Educação - CNTE), Brazil's Popular Front and the People Without Fear Front. The stoppage of public transport and the occupation of public roads caused disruption, especially in São Paulo, Curitiba and Salvador. In a speech, Michel Temer supported the reform as the only way to guarantee pensioners' benefits in the future.

On 28 April, trade union federations and left-wing movements called a general strike against the government's proposed pension and labor reforms. There were demonstrations in 25 states and the Federal District, with public services being paralyzed, violent actions by activists, clashes with the military police and an attack on Michel Temer's house. The public transport sector was affected in all the capitals, which made the streets practically empty. In the ABC region of São Paulo, Brazil's main automotive hub, around 60,000 workers from automakers and other companies in the sector joined the strike and paralyzed vehicle production. In a statement, President Michel Temer criticized the protests. According to him, "small groups blocked highways and avenues to prevent the right of citizens to come and go, preventing them from reaching their place of work or moving freely". On Twitter, Dilma Rousseff commented that "the mobilization in defence of labour and social security rights unites workers and shows the strength of their resistance". Many other politicians and national leaders addressed the crowd and the international media covered the event extensively.

On 17 May, after the allegations of recordings against Temer, a protest took place in front of the São Paulo Museum of Art (MASP), which brought together around a thousand people and blocked part of Paulista Avenue. The group shouted slogans and called for the impeachment of Temer. The demonstration was led by the People Without Fear Front and joined by the Landless Rural Workers Movement. According to the leaders, around 200 demonstrators were expected to head to Brasilia to march outside the Planalto Palace. On 18 and 21 May, other protests were held in different states and in the Federal District.

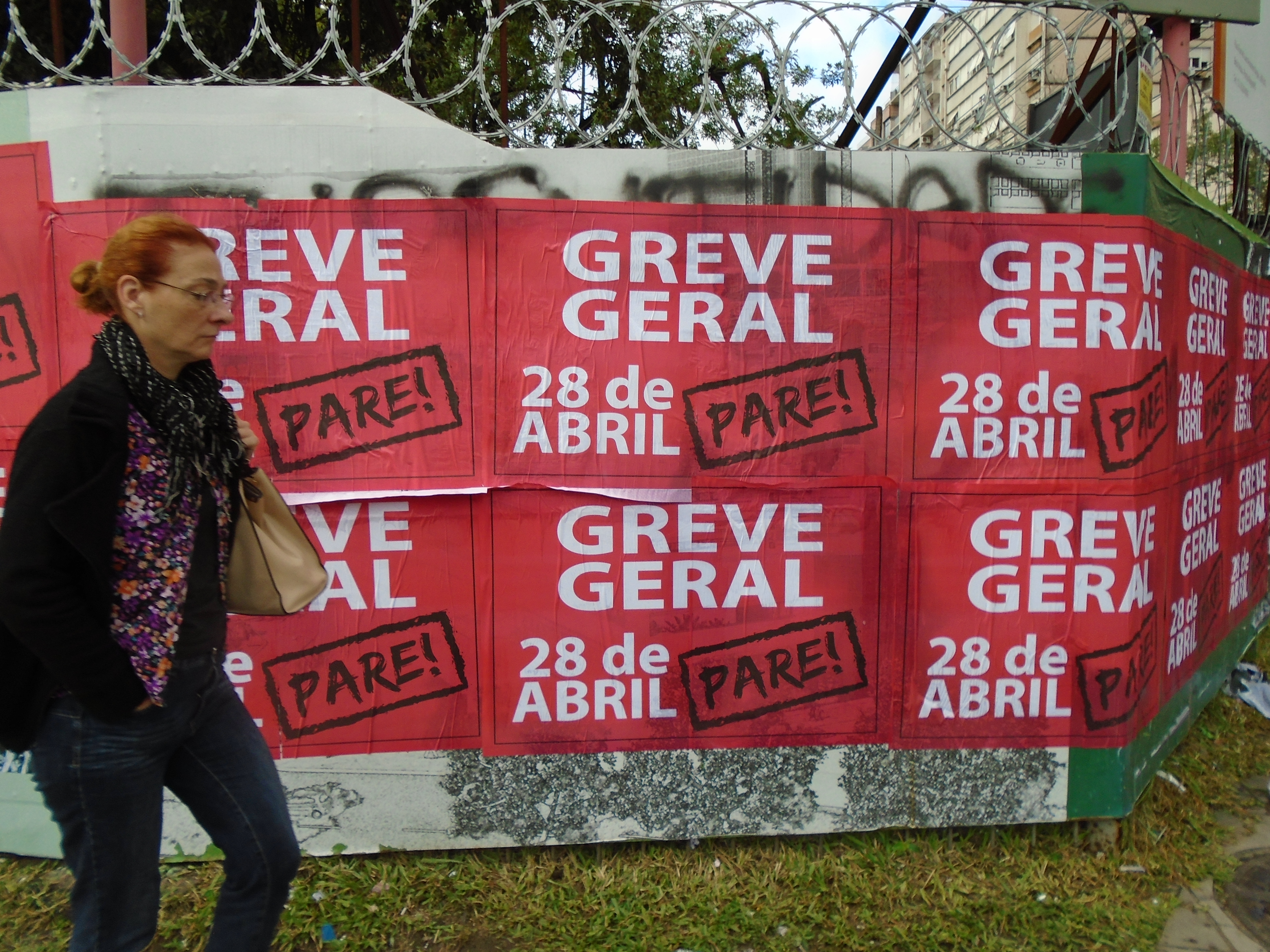
Posters announcing the strike, in Porto Alegre, Rio Grande do Sul.

On 24 May, during a large demonstration, several protesters launched shots at police officers who were patrolling the entrance to the Esplanade of Ministries, which led to a general confrontation and caused the destruction of signposts and ministerial buildings, resulting in small fires inside the Ministries of Agriculture, Planning and Culture. The Unified Workers' Central estimated that the actions brought together two hundred thousand demonstrators throughout the day. According to the Federal District's Public Security Secretariat, seven people were arrested under suspicion of damaging public property, contempt and illegally carrying a weapon. By 7.30pm, 49 people had been injured, including protesters and military police. To contain the situation, the government mobilized 1,500 army troops, which was severely contested.

On 28 May, a demonstration in support of direct elections occurred on Copacabana Beach with the participation of Cordão do Bola Preta and singers such as Mano Brown, Otto, Maria Gadú, Pretinho da Serrinha, Milton Nascimento and Caetano Veloso, as well as left-wing politicians and actors including Daniel de Oliveira and Sophie Charlotte. According to the movement's organizers, there were between fifteen and fifty thousand people.

On 4 June, another demonstration in favor of direct elections took place at Largo do Batata in São Paulo with the participation of singers such as Chico César, Maria Gadú, Criolo, Emicida, Pitty, Tulipa Ruiz, Mano Brown, Otto and Simoninha. The demonstration was organized by social organizations including Brazil’s Popular Front, People Without Fear Front, Unified Workers' Central, Centre of People's Movements (Central de Movimentos Populares - CMP), National Union of Students and Popular Youth Uprising. The leaders addressed the crowd to criticize the Temer government and demand direct elections before 2018. The event was called “SP pelas Diretas Já" ("SP for Direct Elections Now") and, according to the organizers, was attended by around 100,000 people.

On 30 June, new protests against the labor and pension reforms were held across Brazil. The central unions wanted a general strike, but only a few categories joined in and the mobilization weakened. In São Paulo, Paulista Avenue was blocked by representatives of political parties and workers' centers. Many slogans were heard against Temer, mainly demanding that he leave office.

== Government reactions ==
Initially, Temer and his team belittled the protests, describing them as insignificant and conducted by small groups. Later, they embraced the idea of respecting the right to demonstrate.

== See also ==
- 2021 Brazilian protests
- 2020 Brazilian protests
- 2015-2016 Brazilian protests
- 2013 Brazilian protests
- Impeachment proposals against Michel Temer
- Diretas Já
- 2014 Brazilian economic crisis
