= Banda Mole =

Carnival block from Belo Horizonte, Brazil

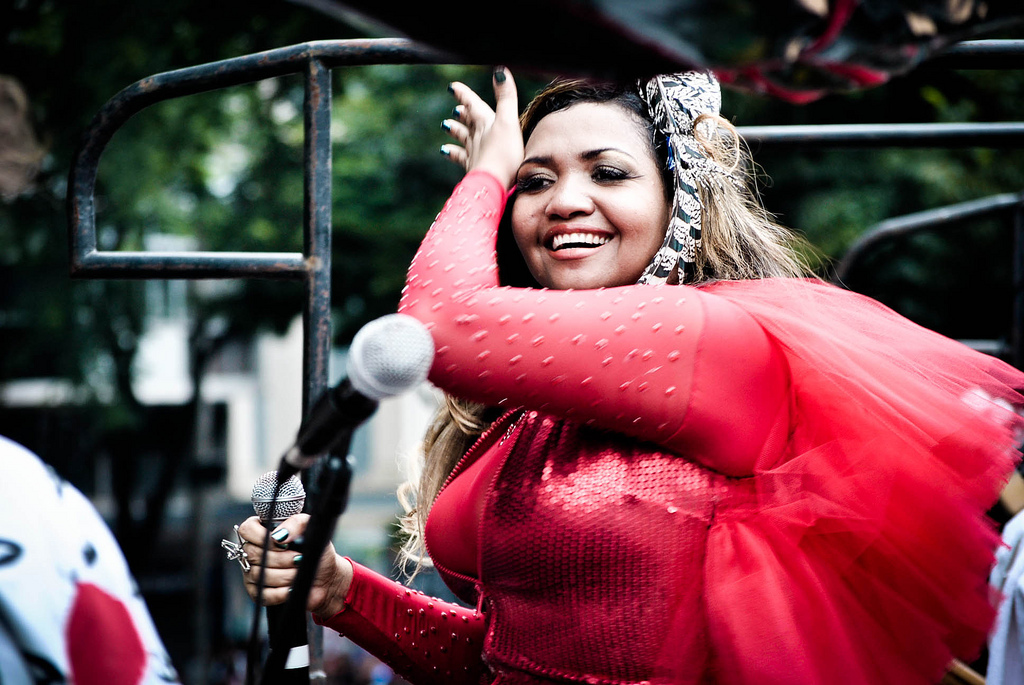
- Gaby Amarantos performs at Banda Mole's parade
- Full name: República Independente da Banda Mole
- Foundation: 1975; 50 years ago
- Symbol: silhouette of a female waist in red string bikini ornamented with confetti and serpentine streamer
- Location: Lagoinha
- President: Luiz Mário "Jacaré" Ladeira; Helvécio "Gaiola" Trotta

2020 presentation
- Title: A BH çurpreendente. Tem essa banda imprecionante! Ela sobe, não dá mole, pra aprendiz de meliante. pra aguentar, só mesmo rindo, do ministro ignorante (BH çurprises (sic). It has this imprecive (sic) band! It goes up, and gives no easy time to an apprentice of miscreant. To withstand, only laughing of the ignorant minister)
- Motif: The administrative failures and recurring grammatical mistakes of Abraham Weintraub, the Brazilian Ministry of Education (Brazil)

República Independente da Banda Mole, or simply Banda Mole (Portuguese for 'soft band')), is a pre-carnival block from Belo Horizonte, Brazil. The name is a pun of bunda mole (Portuguese for 'soft ass'). It was created in the Lagoinha neighborhood in 1975. The block's main tradition is the gender swap: men parades dressed with women's clothes, and women the other way round.

The block co-organizes the Mestre Jonas song contest for the year's carnival marchinha.

== History ==
In 1975, a predecessor block named Leões da Lagoinha (Portuguese for 'Lagoinha's Lions') was extinguished. Some of its members, such as Wellington "Lula" Vanucci, Helvécio "Gaiola" Trotta", Paulo Bonome, and others from the neighborhood founded Banda Mole. The goal was to preserve the culture of street blocks in Belo Horizonte. The block's founding principles were: free of charge, freedom to dress freely, and to have political-social satire.

The first parade happened in 1975 with approximately 100 people. The track started at Lagoinha, and headed towards the city center.

The block had its attendance peak in the 90's, when it had up to 400,000 paraders.

== Traditions ==
Banda Mole parades in the afternoon every Saturday previous to the carnival week (11 days before the Ash Wednesday). The block paraders meet at Goiás st., in front to the Estado de Minas's headquarters. Then it parades up Bahia st., heading towards Savassi, in the city southern region. Since 2004 the meeting point was changed to the Afonso Pena av.

Different trio elétricos with music bands play along the afternoon. The rhythms are typically samba, axé and marchinha.
