= 2020 Brazilian protests =

The 2020 Brazilian protests and demonstrations were popular demonstrations that took place in several regions of Brazil, in the context of the COVID-19 pandemic in Brazil. The protests began on 15 March 2020, with demonstrations in support of President Jair Bolsonaro, the target of several investigations, and against the isolation measures imposed by state governments.

== Background ==
Demonstrations in support of the Jair Bolsonaro government had already been scheduled for 15 March 2020, as a way of supporting the President of the Republic, who had already been the target of investigations on several cases. The president, members of his government and supporters are the target of several investigations and processes in several institutions, including the main ones: the Queiroz Case, which directly involves Senator Flávio Bolsonaro, the president's son; the so-called "Fake News Inquiry", opened by the Supreme Federal Court itself to investigate threats and attacks on members of the Supreme Court; the Moro Case, an investigation initiated after the resignation of former minister Sérgio Moro, who accused Bolsonaro of political interference in the Federal Police with a view to accessing classified information; the Fake News CPMI that runs in the National Congress and the Bolsonaro-Mourão ticket forfeiture proceedings at the Superior Electoral Court (TSE).

However, the demonstrations came under criticism for containing anti-democratic guidelines and also for occurring amid the pandemic of COVID-19 that was in its initial phase in Brazil after the confirmation of the first case on 26 February 2020. Despite the accusations, the Secretariat of Communication said that the protests are "in favor of Brazil" and that it does not intend to attack the congress or the judiciary, in reference to two of the three powers.

== Pro-Bolsonaro Protests ==
=== 15 March ===
On 15 March 2020, the first demonstration in defense of President Jair Bolsonaro takes place in at least 224 Brazilian cities and the Federal District. Despite requests for postponement by the president due to the COVID-19 pandemic, the protests usually took place with the defense of the president and harsh criticisms of the STF and the National Congress for the accusations involving the President of the Republic, in addition to requests for the departure of Rodrigo Maia (DEM-RJ) of the presidency of the Chamber of Deputies and criticism against the left. The event in Brasília was attended by 3,000 people.

=== Anti-isolation riders ===
During the months of March and April, protesters held caravans in some Brazilian cities and the Federal District against local isolation policies, which involved the temporary closure of trade. The action was attended by businessmen who carried Brazilian flags, in addition to the participation of a sound car. In São Paulo, in addition to requests to reopen trade, there were also requests for "Military Intervention" and harsh criticisms of Governor João Doria. The acts also earned the nickname "pro-corona protests".

=== 19 April ===
On 19 April 2020, another wave of demonstrations favorable to President Jair Bolsonaro takes place. In Brasília, there was communication with protesters again in tones of threat, however, Bolsonaro had a coughing crisis in the middle of his speech. The scene reverberated on social networks.

=== 3 May ===
In this act, the protesters again issued slogans against the STF and Rodrigo Maia in Brasília, and there was also a motorcade against the Horizontal Isolation, in addition to requests for Military Intervention. There were also attacks on journalists from the newspaper O Estado de S. Paulo.

=== 17 May ===
Keeping the same agendas of previous demonstrations, with the main one being the reopening of trade during the COVID-19 Pandemic, the protesters occupy two lanes of the Monumental Axis between the Plano Piloto Highway and the Cathedral of Brasília. There were also gatherings at the National Stadium of Brasília Mané Garrincha and in front of the TV Globo Brasília headquarters.

=== 24 May ===
After the video of the Ministerial Meeting on 22 April on 22 May was released, the president walked on the track between Praça dos Três Poderes and Palácio do Planalto, where he waved and interacted with supporters. Protesters with Brazilian flags passed by car and on foot in front of the Esplanada dos Ministérios, guided by a sound car. On the same day, journalists from Rede Globo, Folha de S. Paulo newspaper and a journalist from BandNews TV suffered attacks from protesters, causing the vehicles to no longer cover the protests.

=== 31 May ===
Amid the tightening of relations between the government and the STF (Supreme Federal Court), some protesters carried banners with the words "below the dictatorship of the STF" and "military intervention". There was also a banner asking for "intervention in the STF".

In a live broadcast on his social networks, the president flew over the place by helicopter and waved to the protesters. After the aircraft landed, Bolsonaro, without wearing a mask, walked through the enclosure where the protesters were gathering, contrary to the guidelines of health authorities to maintain social distance due to COVID-19. The agent also picked up a child on his lap.

Images transmitted by CNN Brasil showed that the president still rode a horse during the demonstration. Bolsonaro stayed for about 25 minutes at the site and headed to the Planalto Palace, before returning to the Palácio da Alvorada. The demonstration was called by social networks and the concentration started around 10 am. The president arrived on the scene at about 12 noon.

The day before, a movement called "300 do Brasil", led by ex-feminist and activist Sara Winter with the presence of at least 30 people, marched towards the STF carrying torches and fireworks with threats. The images resonated on social networks with various associations to neo-Nazi movements and the KKK, in addition to comparisons with the 2017 neo-Nazi march in Charlottesville, USA and 2020 in Kyiv, Ukraine.

=== 7 June ===
After requests from the president not to have a demonstration for fear of confrontation between the participants of the demonstrations in opposition to the government, there were some acts, but attracting fewer people than the previous ones. In Brasilia, supporters extended banners with requests for "military intervention" and the creation of a new constitution, in addition to the presence of flags of Imperial Brazil. The participants in the two movements were separated by barriers from the Military Police of the Federal District near Praça dos Três Poderes. He also had acts in Rio de Janeiro on the Copacabana Shore, ending in the detention of four people for carrying knives, wooden sticks and fireworks.

=== 14 June ===
In São Paulo, after an agreement with the Public Ministry on the use of Avenida Paulista for demonstrations, protests in defense of the government began to take place at Viaduto do Chá. In Brasilia, after a pro-Bolsonaro group tried to invade the National Congress on June 13, the governor of the Federal District Ibaneis Rocha banned the circulation of cars and pedestrians at the Esplanada dos Ministérios, the following day. Bolsonarist demonstrations took place in fewer numbers.

=== 21 June ===
The acts took place in some Brazilian cities, in addition to Brasília and São Paulo, but again with a smaller number of protesters, in addition to having a low disclosure by the supporters of the president. The protests brought the same guidelines as the previous ones, but now with answers to the Queiroz case, after Fabrício's arrest. The day before, the situation and opposition fronts, through a virtual meeting, signed an alternation agreement for the use of Avenida Paulista in São Paulo. The demonstrators' concentration took place at two points, including the front of the Fiesp headquarters and the headquarters of the Casper Líbero Foundation.

=== June 28 ===
In Brasilia, protesters again used military intervention banners, requests for impeachment against STF ministers and the reaction of senators and with the flags of Brazil gathering at the Army HQ and at Praça dos Três Poderes. However, the number of participants remained much lower than previous protests, showing a loss of strength in the movement. Participants also accused reporters of weakening the movement.

=== July 19 ===
In a small number, protesters gathered in front of the Esplanada dos Ministérios. Unlike previous movements, there were no attacks on the STF, the chamber and the senate. There were also few tracks with anti-democratic claims. This time, the claims came to be for the legal use of hydroxychloroquine to treat the COVID-19, as well as prayers for the improvement of the president, who is with the virus and the return of attacks on mayors and governors against social isolation and the slow resumption. activities. Jair Bolsonaro did not participate in the event to avoid "bad example", as there was before, in addition to the participants not wearing masks.

== Anti-Bolsonaro Protests ==
=== 31 May ===
Members of organized supporters, including Sport Club Corinthians Paulista, Sociedade Esportiva Palmeiras, Clube de Regatas do Flamengo and other teams held demonstrations in the cities of São Paulo, Rio de Janeiro, Belo Horizonte and Porto Alegre on 31 May 2020 in response to demonstrations favorable to the president. Carrying banners with anti-fascism and "in defense of democracy", participants wore black and white costumes, in addition to organized cheering flags. In São Paulo and Rio, there were clashes against the police, in addition to the meeting with protesters of the situation.

=== 7 June ===
There was an act scheduled for 7 June, bringing together organized supporters, as well as social and union movements. However, by decision of the TJ-SP, in response to a request from the State Government, the demonstrations for and against Bolsonaro that would take place on Avenida Paulista were banned in São Paulo due to the "risk of confrontations and losses". However, on 7 June 2020, acts were recorded in Brasília and Rio de Janeiro, but now bringing agendas against racism in support of the United States' anti-racism movements, defense of the SUS, anti-fascism and Bolsonaro's impeachment. The event also had the participation of organized fans, in addition to the use and distribution of masks and alcohol gel for the participants. In Rio, there were clashes with the Military Police. In São Paulo, despite the ban on demonstrations on Avenida Paulista, the act took place at Largo da Batata. There were also protests from doctors, nurses and medical students in front of the Hospital de Clínicas. In Belo Horizonte, the demonstrations brought together doctors and took place at Praça da Estação. In Belém, protesters gathered in front of the São Brás Market being divided into groups respecting social distance, ending in the arrest of at least 30 people for non-compliance with the state decree on prevention of COVID-19 that prohibits agglomerations that exceed the limit of ten people.

=== 13-14 June ===
On 13 June, there were acts against the government in Brasília, in addition to a motorcade raising banners and stickers against the government. A group of protesters gathered in front of Funarte in the direction of the National Congress and another in the Praça do Museu Nacional. On 14 June, there was the third act against the government in São Paulo on Avenida Paulista, with the participation of the supporters of the teams Palmeiras and Corinthians who hoisted a large banner, in addition to the use of green flags. Also present were members of anti-fascism and anti-racism movements, union fronts and opposition parties.

=== 21 June ===
On the fourth day of protests against the government and with the support of anti-racist, anti-fascist fronts and supporters organized in defense of democracy, in addition to union fronts and opposition parties, the demonstrations took place in different points and cities, with the biggest act expected in Brasília. The concentration takes place in front of the National Library and the walk follows the north direction of the Planalto Palace. An open letter was delivered to the federal deputy and mayor, Rodrigo Maia (DEM-RJ), which was then read out loud by the protesters.

=== 28 June ===
Unlike other Sundays, on this day there was not so much movement on the streets, concentrating mostly on the internet, supporting the Chega! of Portugal and the national movement #StopBolsonaro. In front of the National Congress, a thousand wooden crosses were placed, in addition to a banner criticizing the president about the 50 thousand killed by COVID-19.

=== 15 August 2020 ===
This time, members of the Vem pra Rua Movement held a motorcade with the participation of between 30 and 35 cars in support of Operation Lava Jato and also calling for the Impeachment of Jair Bolsonaro and support for a possible candidacy of Sérgio Moro for the presidency of Brazil in 2022. The protests lasted three hours and passed in strategic points of Brasilia as the Attorney General's Office, Rodoviária, Esplanada dos Ministérios, Federal Police superintendence in Brasilia and the Specialized Police Department of the Civil Police of DF. The demonstration ended at 12:50 pm with the sound of the national anthem in front of the Museum of the Republic.

== See also ==
- 2013 protests in Brazil
- 2014 protests in Brazil
- 2015-2016 protests in Brazil
- 2016–2017 Brazilian protests
