= O Homem da Meia-Noite =

Carnival block in Olinda, Brazil

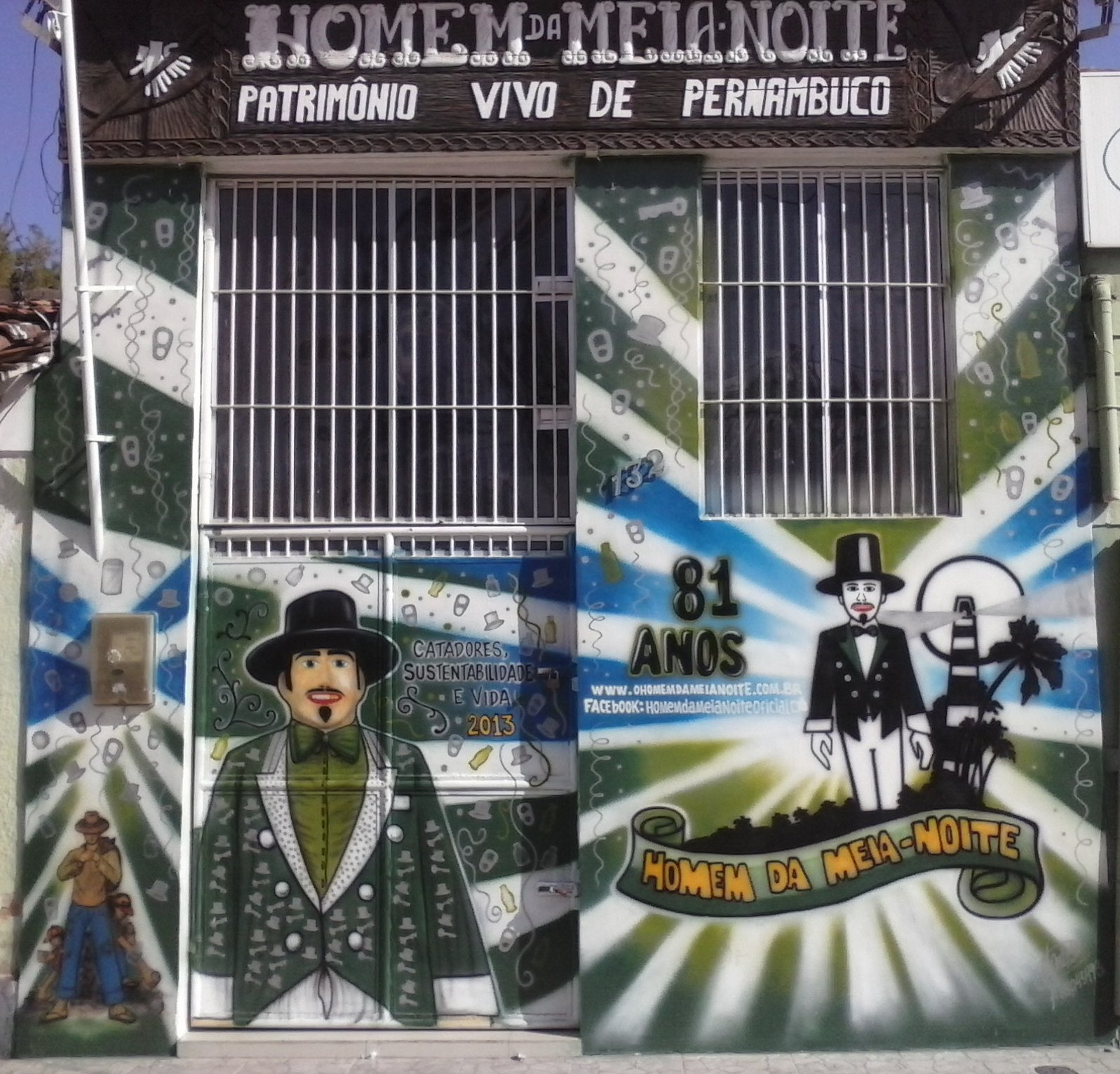
- Headquarter at Olinda's historical center

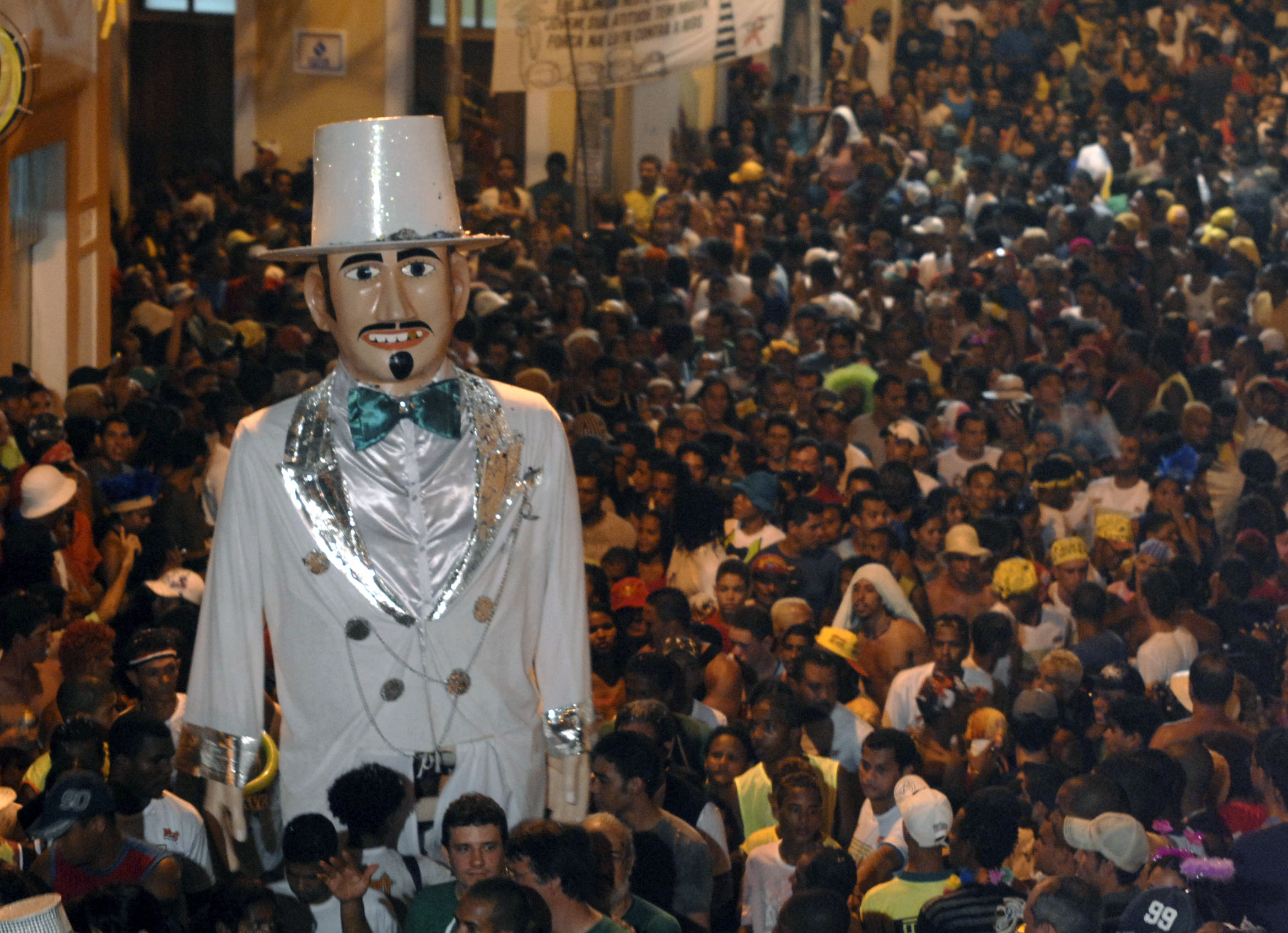
- Midnight Man's doll at 2008 parade
- Full name: Clube Carnavalesco de Alegoria e Crítica O Homem da Meia-Noite
- Foundation: February 2, 1931; 94 years ago
- Symbol: man with a Van Dyke beard and gold tooth dressed in a suit with a Bow tie and top hat
- Location: Olinda

O Homem da Meia-Noite (Portuguese for 'The Midnight Man') is a carnival block in Olinda, Brazil. The block was created in 1931 by Benedito Bernardino da Silva, Luciano Anacleto de Queiroz, Sebastião da Silva, Cosme José dos Santos, Heliodoro Pereira da Silva, and shoemaker Manoel Joaquim dos Santos. It parades on carnival Saturday midnight at Olinda's historical center, being the first block to perform. frevo is the main played rhythm, but others are also played, such as samba and marchinhas.

O Homem da Meia Noite is an intangible cultural heritage of Pernambuco since 2006.

== History ==
Homem da Meia-Noite was founded on February 2, 1931, following an internal dispute at Cariri Olindense. Luciano Anacleto de Queiroz, Sebastião da Silva, Cosme José dos Santos, Heliodoro Pereira da Silva, and shoemaker Manoel Joaquim dos Santos (Neco Monstro) were not accepted at the block's board, and decided to create the new block. Back then, Cariri Olindense was the first block to parade at Olinda's carnival. Thus, to rival with them, the founders decided to parade at the midnight hour between carnival's Saturday and Sunday, becoming the opening act since then. Later, both blocks have reconciled. Now it is a tradition that Homem da Meia-Noite hands in the city key to Cariri right after its parade.

Between 1931 and 1932, Homem da Meia-Noite had only a standard (with a clock showing midnight hour) and the doll. After, it has incorporated other carnival elements. The block did not parade between 1950 and 1953 due to financial issues.

== Family ==
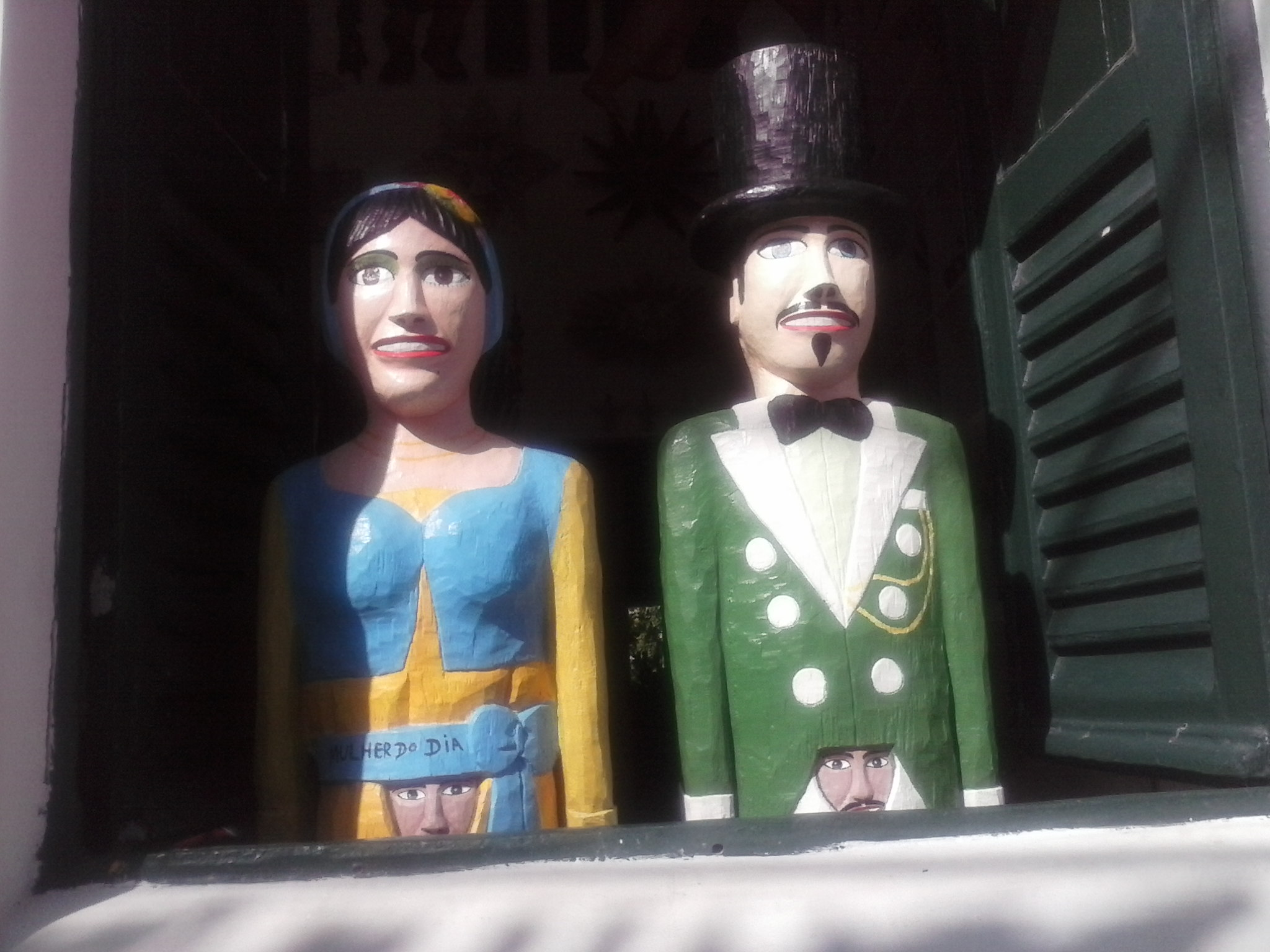
A Mulher do dia e O Homem da Meia-Noite

Other characters have been created in association to Homem da Meia-Noite. A Mulher do Dia (Portuguese for 'The Day Woman') was created in 1967. The doll only parades on Sunday, thus only meets Homem da Meia Noite when all giant dolls parade together. The figure was created by the craftsman Julião das Máscaras, who was inspired by Monalisa. It has long dark hair, a gold tooth smile, and wears yellow and blue in a reference to Yemọja e Oshun. Homem and Mulher were "officially" married in a ceremony in February 1990.

O Menino da Tarde (Portuguese for 'The Afternoon Boy') is the first offspring of the marriage between Homem da Meia-Noite and Mulher do Dia. The figure was created in 1974 also by Julião das Máscaras. He is dressed as an adult.

In 1977 A Menina da Tarde (Portuguese for 'The Afternoon Girl') was created by Sílvio Botelho. The character is a vain girl who wears new clothes every carnival.
