= Hungarian Brazilians =

Hungarian Brazilians Húngaro-brasileiros · Brazíliai magyarok
- (Hungary) (Brazil)
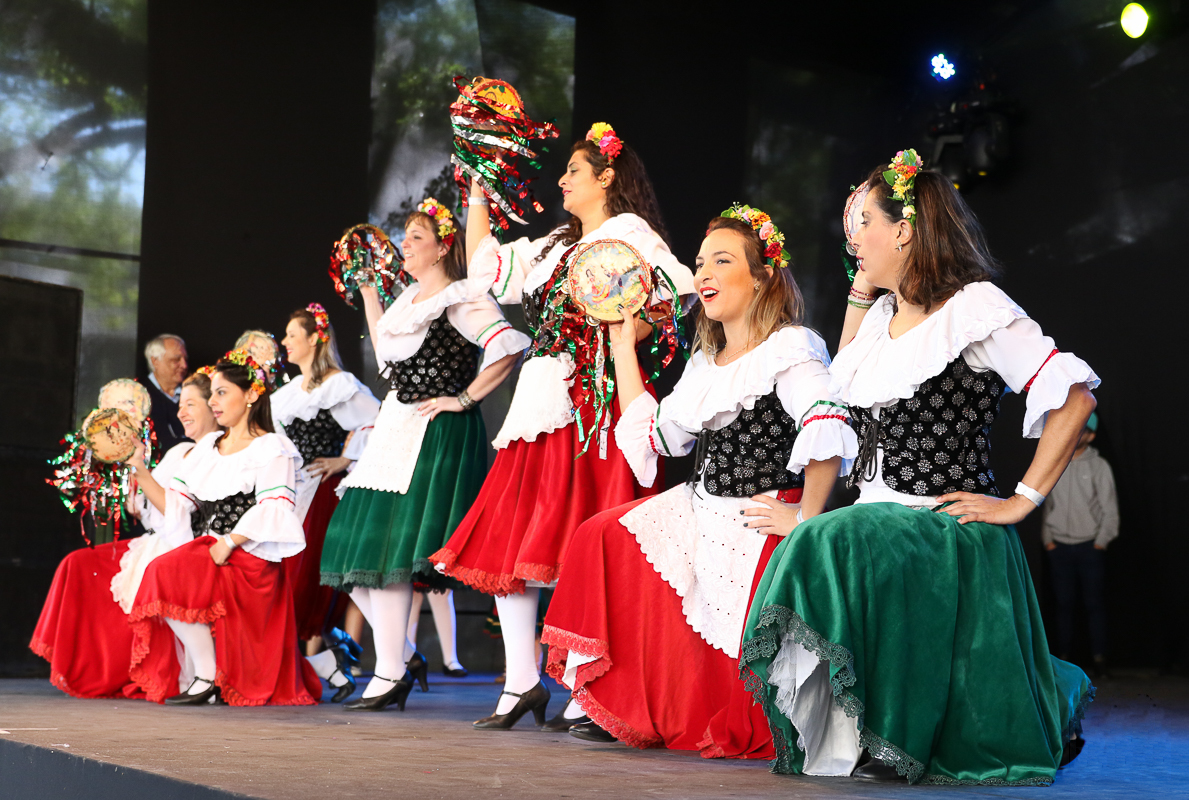
- Hungarian descendants in São Paulo.

Total population
- 80,000-100,000

Regions with significant populations
- Mainly São Paulo and Rio de Janeiro

Languages
- Portuguese, Hungarian

Religion
- Predominantly Catholic, some Jewish

Related ethnic groups
- Other White Brazilians, Hungarians

Hungarian Brazilians (Portuguese: húngaro-brasileiros or magiar-brasileiros, Hungarian: brazíliai magyarok) are Brazilians of full, partial, or predominantly Hungarian ancestry, or Hungarian-born people who emigrated to Brazil.

According to the Embassy of Hungary to Brazil, there are between 80,000 and 100,000 Brazilians of Hungarian descent, most of them living in São Paulo and 8-10% living in Rio de Janeiro.

== History ==
The Hungarian brothers João Carlos and Francisco Hofbauer (Portuguese written) came to Brazil from the city of Győr in 1826, escaping from political persecution. By the time they arrived in Brazil, they changed their surnames from Hofbauer to Hungria (Hungary, in Portuguese), founding the Hungria family in Brazil.

There is also the former Hungarian Baptist Church, that recently changed its name to Igreja Batista Metropolitana, in the Lapa neighborhood of São Paulo, on Pio XI street. A large Hungarian community erected this church in the mid 20th century, and held services in Hungarian until 1998. Today all services are in Portuguese, but a few descendants of the Hungarian community still can be seen in this church.

== Notable Hungarian Brazilians ==
- Adriane Galisteu
- Alexander Lenard
- Cássia Kiss
- Dalton Vigh
- Gastão Rosenfeld
- Ilona Szabó de Carvalho
- Kevin Kurányi
- Paulo Miklos
- Paulo Rónai
- Rafael Lusvarghi
- Roberto Justus
- Lajos Ferenz Kokay
- Erika Kokay
- Alceu de Freitas Wamosy
- Tamás Szmrecsányi

== See also ==
- Brazil–Hungary relations
- Immigration to Brazil
- White Brazilians
- Hungarian diaspora
