= Cordão da Bola Preta =

Carnival block in Rio de Janeiro, Brazil

Galo da Madrugada
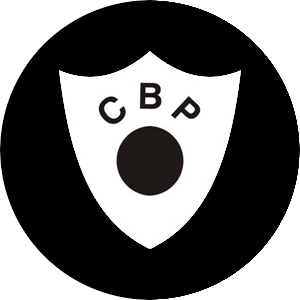

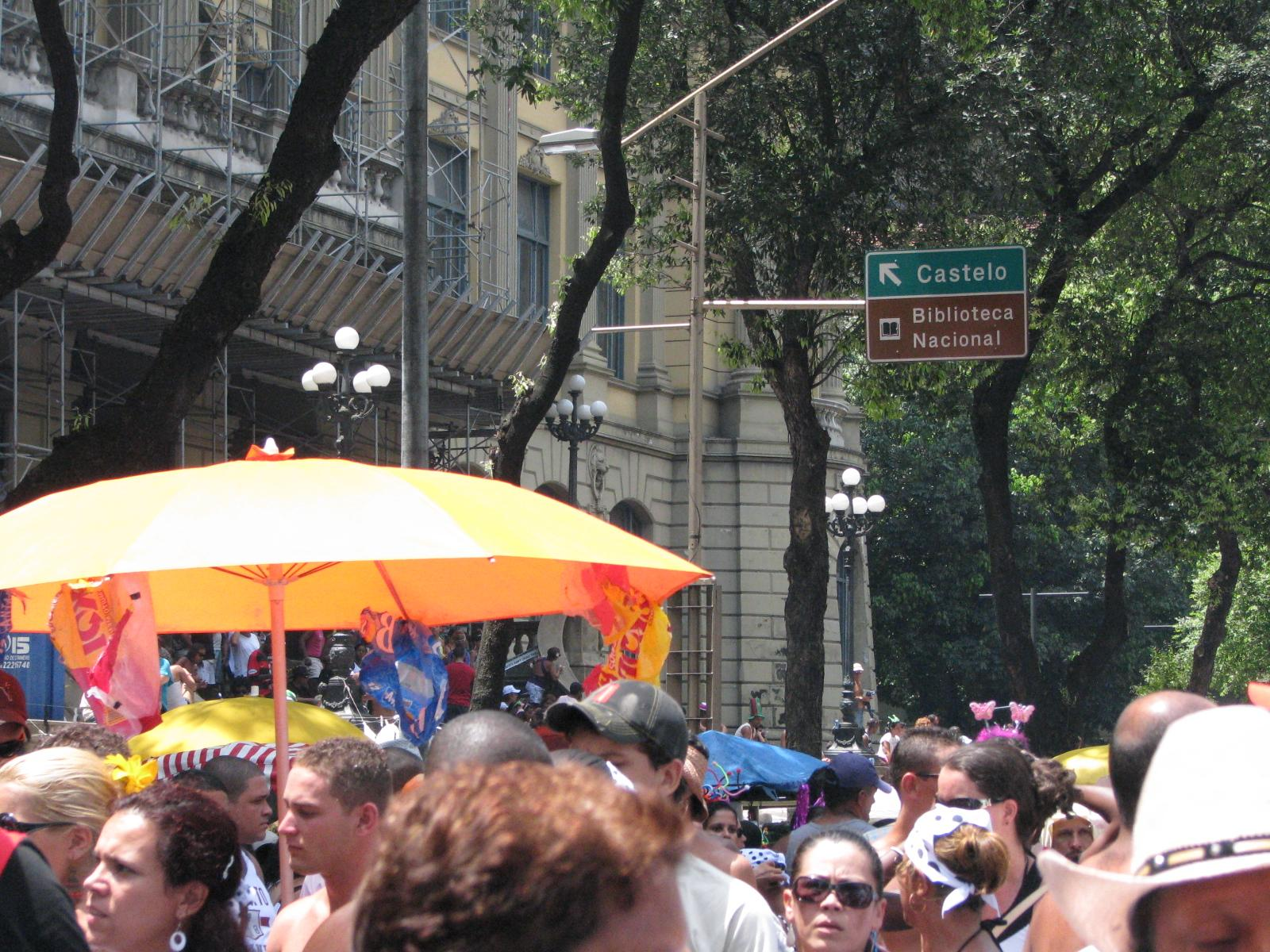
- People parading at Bola Preta
- Foundation: December 13, 1918; 106 years ago
- Colors
- Symbol: a black ball
- Location: Lapa, Rio de Janeiro
- President: Pedro Ernesto Marinho
Carnival staff
- Queen of Battery: Paolla Oliveira
- Godmother of Battery: Maria Rita
- Mestre-sala and Porta-Bandeira: Leandra Leal

Website
- cordaodabolapreta.com

Cordão da Bola Preta (Portuguese for 'string of the black ball'), shortly Bola Preta, is a carnival block that parades every carnival Saturday in Rio de Janeiro, Brazil. Bola Preta was founded in 1918. The main rhythm is marchinha, but several other rhythms are also played.

The block attracts more than a million followers every year. In 2013, that number was more than 2,500,000 people. Its size is only matched by Galo da Madrugada in Recife.
