= Rafael Lusvarghi =

Brazilian soldier, policeman and social activist

Rafael Marques Lusvarghi
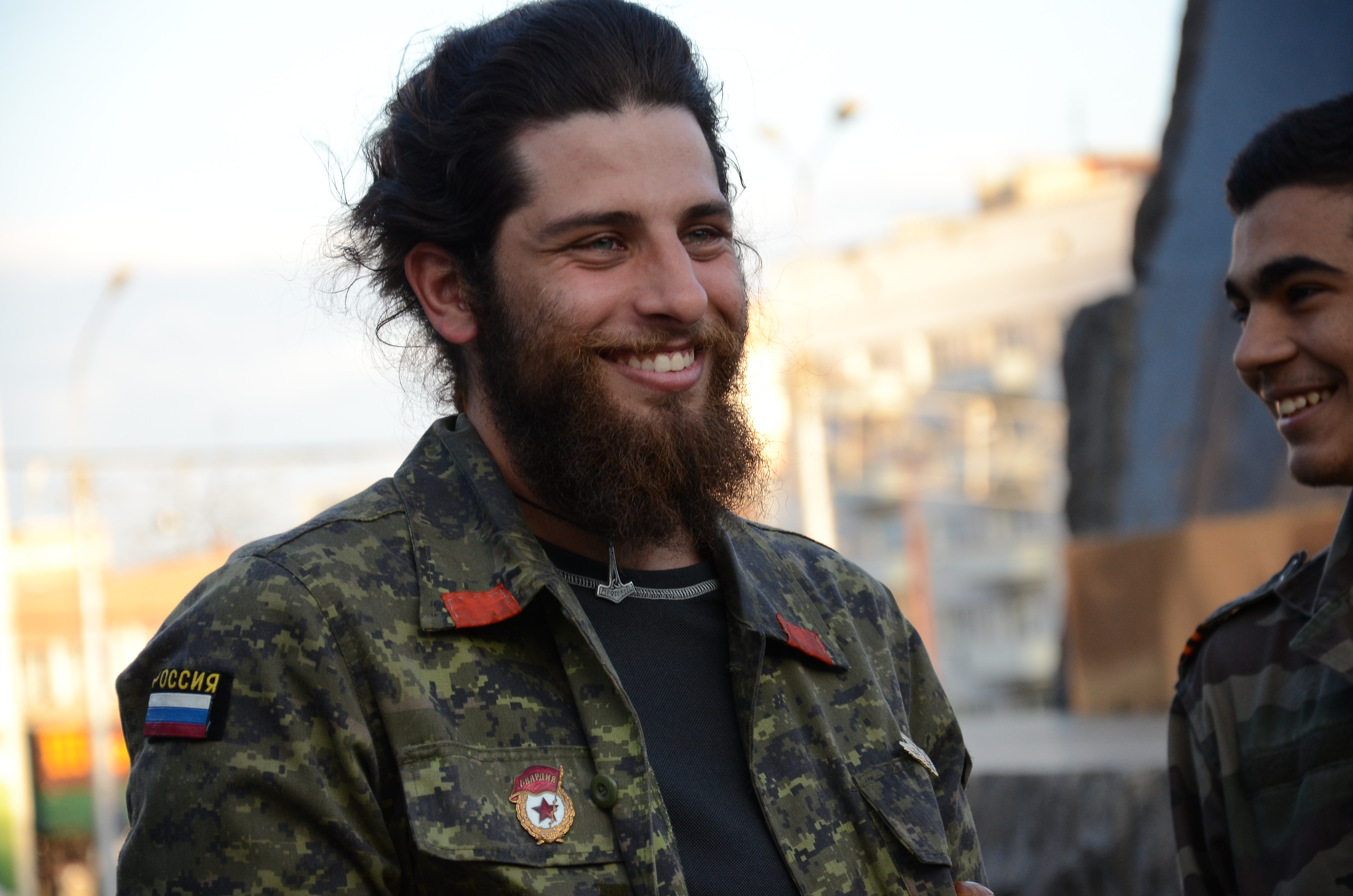
- Lusvarghi in 2015
- Nicknames: Rurik; Cachaça
- Born: November 14, 1984 (age 41); Jundiaí, Brazil
- Allegiance: French Foreign Legion; Military Police of São Paulo State; Military Police of Pará State; Revolutionary Armed Forces of Colombia; Prizrak Brigade
- Service years: 2003–2015
- Rank: Senior lieutenant
- Other work: English teacher; Help desk assistant

Rafael Marques Lusvarghi (born November 14, 1984) is a Hungarian Brazilian former military, activist and policeman. After serving in the French Foreign Legion, the Brazilian Military Police and the Revolutionary Armed Forces of Colombia, he became nationally known in Brazil for his arrest during the 2014 FIFA World Cup protests, afterwards going to the Luhansk People's Republic, where he fought for Russia and became a senior lieutenant for the Prizrak Brigade. After having returned to Brazil, he was arrested during a layover in Ukraine and condemned to thirteen years in prison in counts of terrorism and formation of an illegal paramilitary unit. Having been provisionally released by a court of appeal, he was suddenly captured in 2018 by Azov Battalion and C14 and taken to authorities, which hastened his trial, afterwards provisorily sentencing him on May 11 to sixty days in prison. On May 2, 2019, he was sentenced by a court in Ukraine to 13 years in prison for his willing participation as a terrorist and propagandist in Russia's waging of aggressive war on Ukraine. Lusvarghi was released (during a major prison exchange) and handed over to Donetsk People's Republic and Luhansk People's Republic representatives on 29 December 2019. On 3 November 2021, a Brazilian court sentenced Lusvarghi to eight years in prison for his alleged involvement in the illegal drug trade.

== Military career ==
After finishing an agronomy vocational school, Lusvarghi allegedly went to France and, in November 2002, enlisted in the Foreign Legion, where he served for three years, at first participating in the 4th Foreign Regiment, and then in the 2nd Foreign Parachute Regiment, through which he allegedly participated in missions in Africa before being harmed and returning to Brazil. Back to his native country, he became a soldier in the Military Police of São Paulo State between 2006 and 2007, afterwards serving in Pará as he sought the officer career, leaving the institution as a cadet in 2009 and going to Russia in 2010, where he studied medicine in the Kursk State University, was nicknamed Rurik and became notorious in his home country after witnessing the accidental death of a fellow Brazilian, then also studying medical sciences.

In Russia, Lusvarghi allegedly worked in the children's school Udmurtija and tried to enter the Russian Ground Forces, but, not being able to, he returned to South America, where he claims to have entered the Revolutionary Armed Forces of Colombia, serving in Cartagena and Arauca before feeling frustrated with negotiations with the Colombian state and leaving the forces, returning to his native city Jundiaí and working as an English language teacher and a help desk assistant. He became once again nationally famous after his second imprisonment during the 2014 protests in Brazil, in São Paulo. In this particular occasion, he was photographed being brutalised by police with a plastic bottle and pepper spray, accused of being part of a black bloc group and arrested for 45 days in the 8th Police Station of São Paulo before being released for lack of evidence, after technical reports proved he did not possess any explosive materials on occasion. According to an interview to Portal G1, the proof of his supposed crime was an empty bottle of yogurt he did not even recognise as his own.

=== Luhansk campaign ===
Flag of Prizrak Brigade, for which Lusvarghi fought in Ukraine

On September 20, 2014, having been convoked by the Continental Unity and the Brazilian Front, Lusvarghi, in the context of War in Donbas, costed his own trip to the Russian puppet state of the Luhansk People's Republic, where he was alleged in Sloviansk and entered the artillery of the Prizrak Brigade, associated to the Unity, in a battalion commanded by the Colombian Victor Afonso Lenta, operating a BM-21 Grad vehicle. On occasion, Lusvarghi reported to have been motivated by family links to the Russian people, plus aversion to liberalism and NATO's advances, specially representing the interests of the United States and the European Union. Afterwards, he reported having become a supporter of the Fourth Political Theory.

Initially fighting for the Paltinik unit as a soldier of the infantry duty, he was transferred for the Babay unit in November, where he quickly became an instructor, being promoted in January 2015 to first sergeant and returning to Paltinik, afterwards being promoted to senior lieutenant. Lusvarghi fought aside at least three other Brazilians in this early period, and received, as a tribute to the hard liquor of his native country, the nom de guerre "Cachaça", which he used for the same period in social media.

During the war, Lusvarghi came to head his own unit, with volunteers from many nationalities, including Brazilians, called Vikernes, named after the Norwegian musician Varg Vikernes, who was afterwards informed of the tribute by Lusvarghi himself. In April 2015, he was harmed in action in the Donetsk International Airport and hospitalised. According to a report by the Security Service of Ukraine, he took part in duty in the Donetsk localities of Horlivka, Permovaisk and Verhulivka, plus in the Luhansk Oblast localities of Starobesheve and Debaltseve, receiving a medal from Igor Strelkov. After being allegedly disappointed by the resolutions of Minsk II, the behaviour of the allied group Rusich and the low quality of new soldiers, he returned to Brazil.

==== Imprisonment ====
On October 6, 2016, Lusvarghi was detained by the Security Service of Ukraine in the Boryspil International Airport, having been attracted by supposed job opportunities in the Omega company and intercepted in layover. Investigations by the Brazilian independent magazine Opera claimed the company had among its clients the Maximum Directory of Intelligence of the Ukrainian Ministry of Defense, and that a preventive detention warrant had been emitted in Kyiv two days before he arrived the country.

On January 25, 2017, Lusvarghi was condemned to thirteen years in prison and forfeiture for terrorism and creation of an illegal paramilitary, in a polemical condemnation which represented the first process against a foreigner for such crimes in the country, drawing attention from the Ukrainian lawyer Valentin Rybin, who started to advocate for the ex-military, disclosing that his client had confessed under torture, which Lusvarghi had himself alleged in private letters, and also had been forced to make statements against his own will, as opposed to what the Brazilian Ministry of Foreign Affairs had claimed before. Although Lusvarghi did not manage to take part in the usual prisoners' exchange, his condemnation was revoked on August 17 by the Court of Appeal, which abode the argumentation that the original judgement had based itself solely in the confession of the ex-military, without taking account the allegation of forced guilt plea, which granted him provisional release until next trial, accomplished on December 18 after expiration of the deadline for new pleas.

With his passport retained, Lusvarghi started to work for and live in the Monastery of Holy Intercession, in the Holosiivskyi National Nature Park, converting from Ásatrú to Orthodox Christianity. After being found by Radio Svoboda in late April, however, he took shelter in the Brazilian embassy, in which outskirts he was captured on 4 May by far-right groups Azov Battalion and C14 and taken to authorities, attacking him in action transmitted live on Facebook by Serhi Filimonov and leaving him at the doorstep of the Security Service of Ukraine. On the following day, his court hearing was rescheduled from June 6 to 7 May. According to the Brazilian Ministry of Foreign Affairs, despite the truculence displayed on the video, Lusvarghi, who asked for police protection after the assault, was well and safe. The case's attorney announced he would demand imprisonment.

Lusvarghi was released (during a major prison exchange) and handed over to Donetsk People's Republic and Luhansk People's Republic representatives on 29 December 2019.

== Return to Brazil ==
On 9 May 2021, Lusvarghi was arrested in Brazil for possession of drugs and ammunition. Lusvarghi told the Brazilian police he had arrived in Presidente Prudente, São Paulo in search of work a month earlier and had agreed to keep drugs and ammunition at home at the request of other people, for this he was given 3,000 reais per month. On 3 November 2021, a Brazilian court sentenced Lusvarghi to eight years in prison.

== See also ==
- Aleksey Mozgovoy
- Novorossiya (confederation)
- Aleksandr Dugin
