= Brazil–Hungary relations =

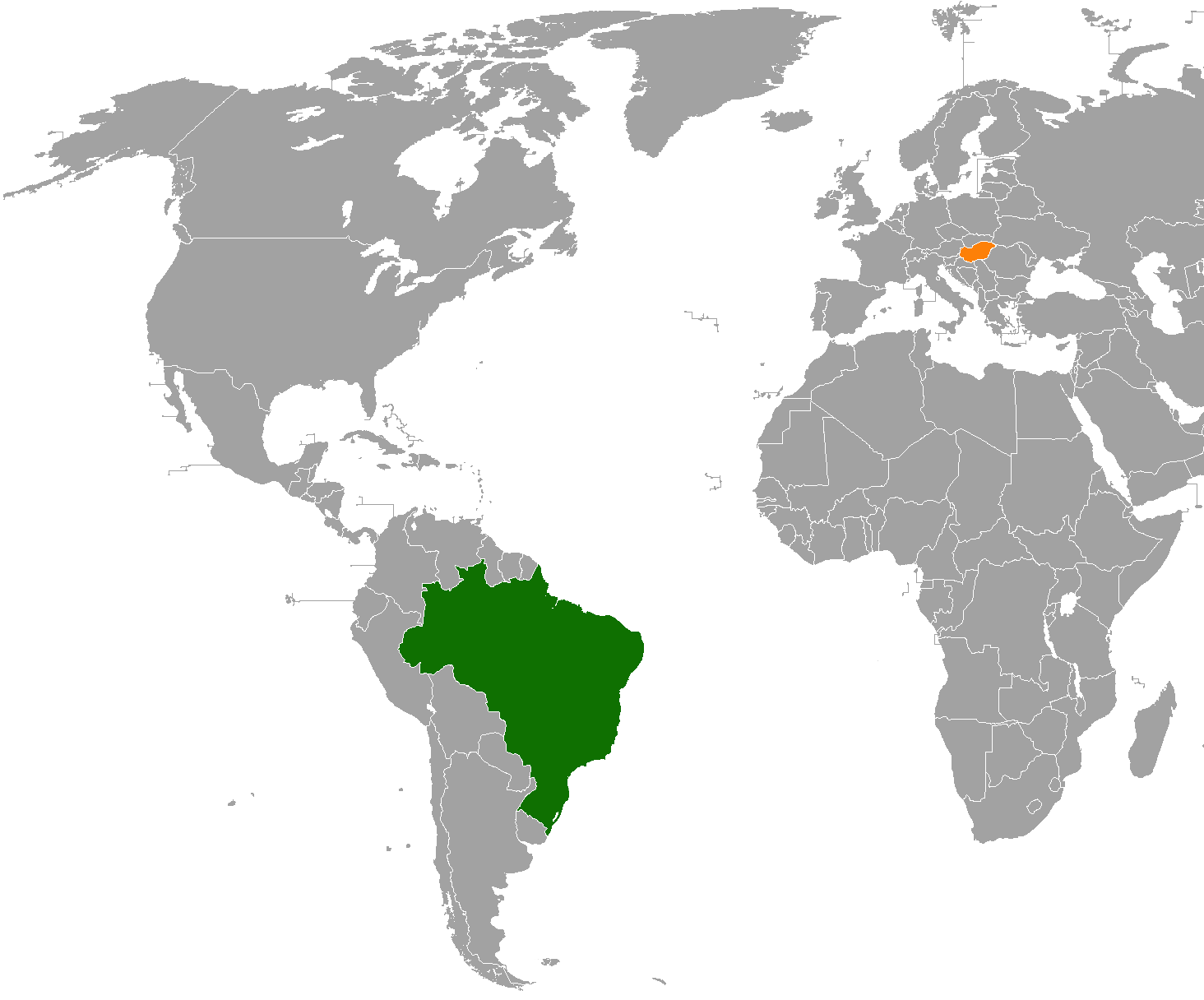

- Brazil: Hungary

Brazil–Hungary relations are the diplomatic relations between Brazil and Hungary. The importance of relations centres on the history of Hungarian immigration to Brazil. Approximately 100,000 Brazilians have Hungarian ancestry, making it the largest Hungarian community in Latin America. Brazil has an embassy in Budapest, while Hungary has an embassy in Brasília and a consulate-general in São Paulo. Both nations are members of the United Nations.

== History ==
The first wave of Hungarian immigration to Brazil took place in the second half of the nineteenth century, due to the promise from Brazil to provide pieces of land for immigrants (as a way to encourage European immigration to the country) with many settling in the Brazilian state of Santa Catarina. In 1871, during a tour of Europe, Emperor Pedro II of Brazil visited Hungary (at the time part of the Austro-Hungarian Empire). In 1873, Brazil opened an honorary consulate in Budapest.

In 1917, during World War I, Brazil declared war on the Central Powers (which included Hungary). The second big wave of Hungarian immigrants arrived to Brazil just after World War I, mainly from the territories Hungary lost as a consequence of the Treaty of Trianon. In 1923, Brazil recognized the independence of Hungary and in 1927, both nations established diplomatic relations. That same year, Hungary opened a diplomatic legation in Rio de Janeiro and Brazil opened one too in Budapest in 1929.

In 1942, Brazil declared war on the Axis powers (for which Hungary belonged to). As a result, diplomatic relations between Brazil and Hungary were severed. During the war (and soon afterwards), many Hungarians immigrated to Brazil, particularly Hungarians of Jewish origin. Relations between both nations were re-established in 1961 and in 1962, Brazil re-opened its diplomatic legation in Budapest. In 1974, both nations elevated their legations to embassies.

In 1994, Brazilian President-Elect, Fernando Henrique Cardoso, paid a visit to Hungary. In 1997, Hungarian President Árpád Göncz paid a visit to Brazil, becoming the first Hungarian head-of-state to visit the South American nation. In 2011, the Hungarian Government launched a strategic planning document that included Brazil among its foreign policy priorities. In 2013, Brazilian Vice-President Michel Temer paid a visit to Hungary. In 2017, both nations celebrated 90 years of diplomatic relations.

In January 2019, Hungarian Prime Minister, Viktor Orbán, paid a visit to Brazil to attend the inauguration of President Jair Bolsonaro. In February 2022, Bolsonaro paid a visit to Hungary, making him the second Brazilian President in office to visit the country.

During the International Ministerial Conference on Freedom of Religion or Belief, in July 2022 in London, Hungarian Minister of Foreign Affairs and Trade Péter Szijjártó requested a meeting with Brazilian Ministry of Women, Family and Human Rights Cristiane Britto, to learn more about the Brazilian electoral environment. Britto commented about polarization and highlighted the similarities in the views of both countries regarding family issues. Szijjártó asked if there was anything that Hungary could do to help in Bolsonaro's reelection, and highlighted that Brazil had the largest Hungarian community in Latin America and that it mostly supported the incumbent president.

== High-level visits ==
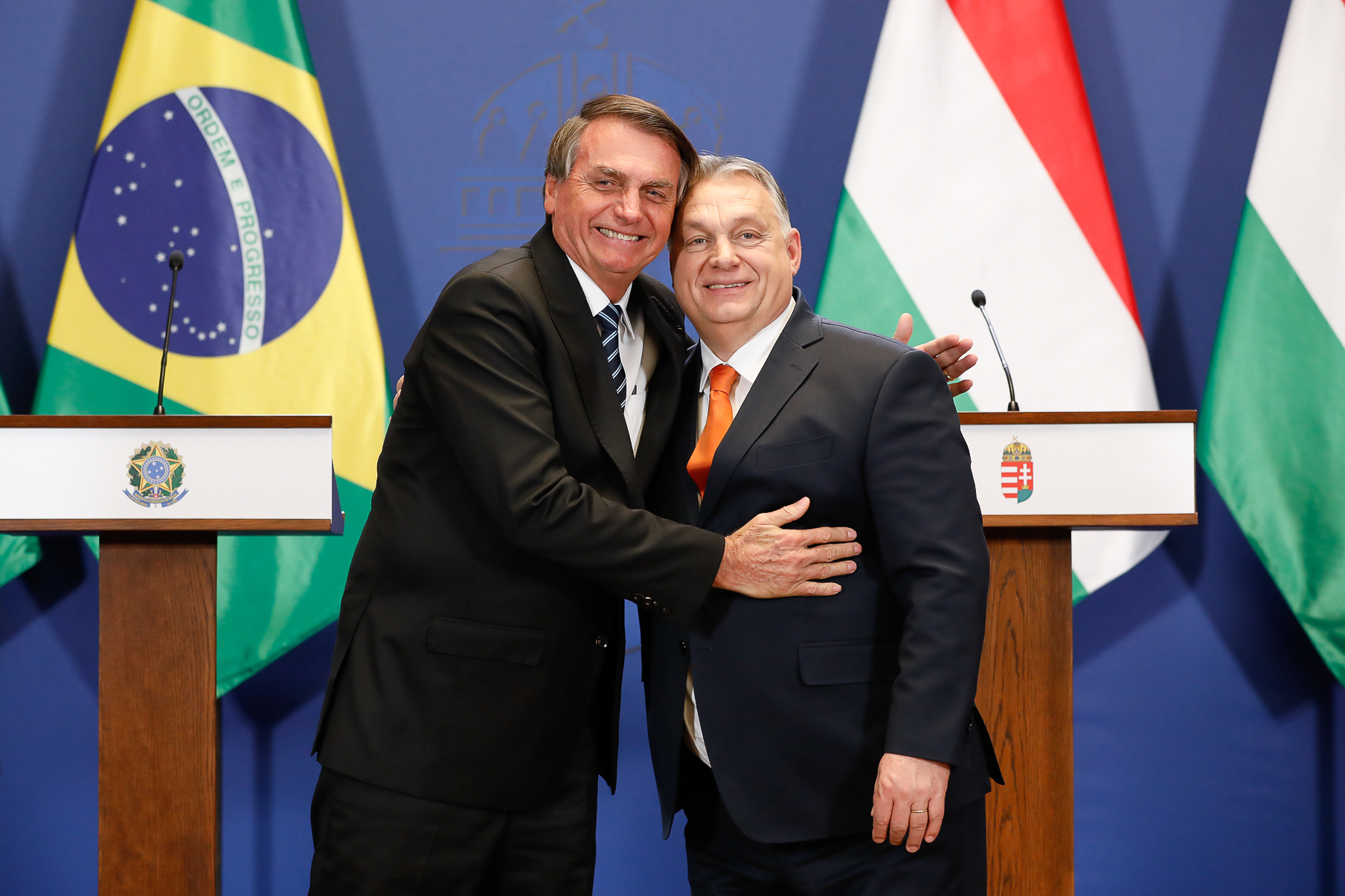
Bolsonaro and Orbán in Budapest, Hungary, in 2022

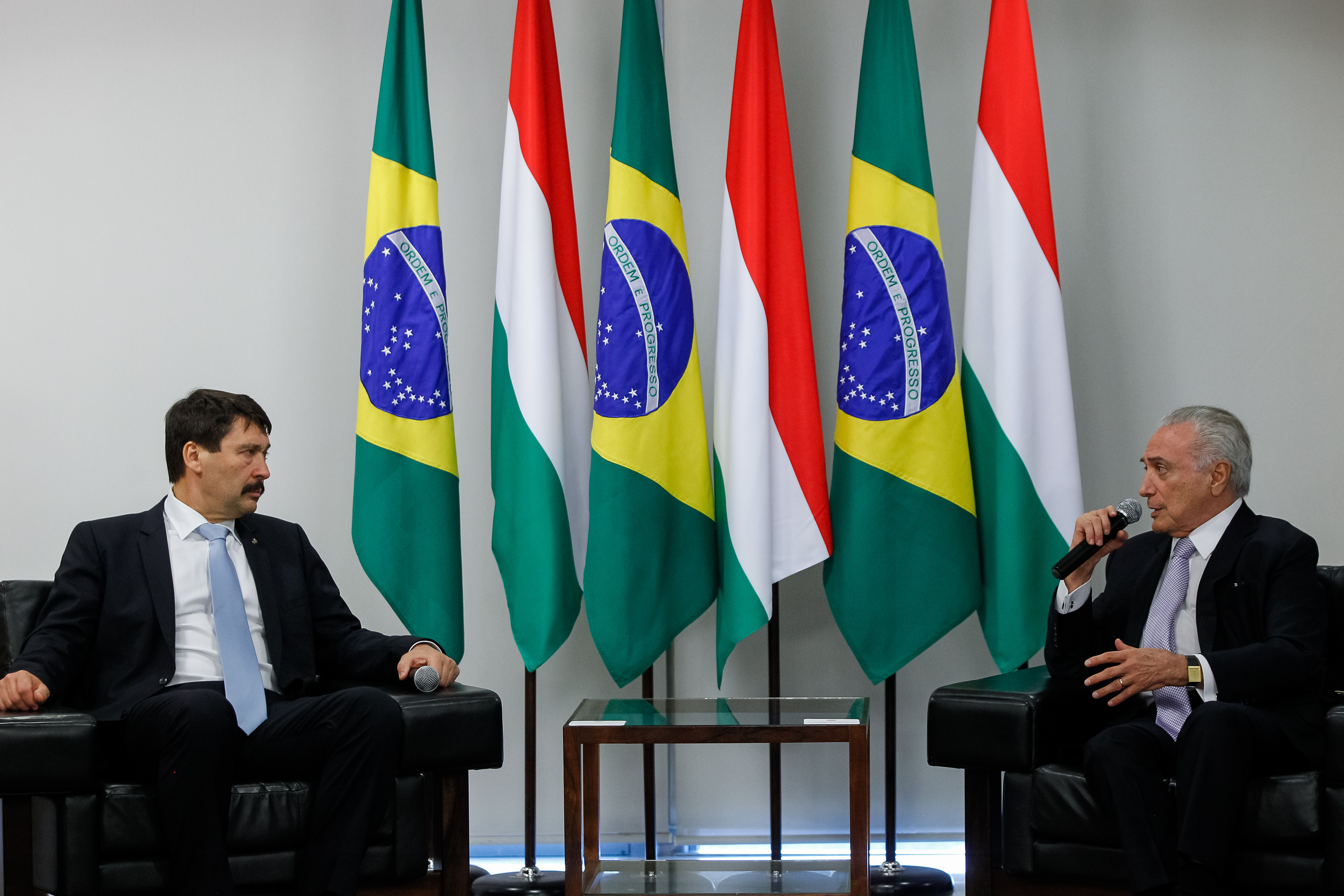
Meeting of President of Hungary János Áder and President of Brazil Michel Temer in Brasília in 2018

High-level visits from Brazil to Hungary

- Emperor Pedro II of Brazil (1871)
- Vice-President Michel Temer (2013)
- Foreign Minister Ernesto Araújo (2019)
- President Jair Bolsonaro (2022)

High-level visits from Hungary to Brazil

- Foreign Minister Géza Jeszenszky (1992)
- President Árpád Göncz (1997)
- Foreign Minister János Martonyi (2012)
- President János Áder (2012, 2016, 2018)
- Prime Minister Viktor Orbán (2016, 2019)
- Foreign Minister Péter Szijjártó (2019)

== Bilateral agreements ==
Both nations have signed several bilateral agreements such as an Agreement to avoid double taxation (1986); Agreement on Scientific, Technical and Technological Cooperation (1992); Agreement on Economic Cooperation (2006); Memorandum of Understanding between Hungary's Eximbank and the Brazilian Development Bank (2012); and an Agreement of Cooperation between the Hungarian Ministry of Rural Development and the Brazilian Ministry of Fisheries and Aquaculture (2013).

== Trade ==
In 2018, trade between both nations totaled US$480 million. Brazil's main exports to Hungary include: parts and turbine motores for airplanes; automobile parts; machinery; leather; and coffee. Hungary's main exports to Brazil include: machinery, vehicles and processed products. Brazil is Hungary's second largest trading partner in Latin America (after Mexico).

== Resident diplomatic missions ==
Of Brazil

- Budapest (Embassy)

Of Hungary

- Brasília (Embassy)
- São Paulo (Consulate-General)

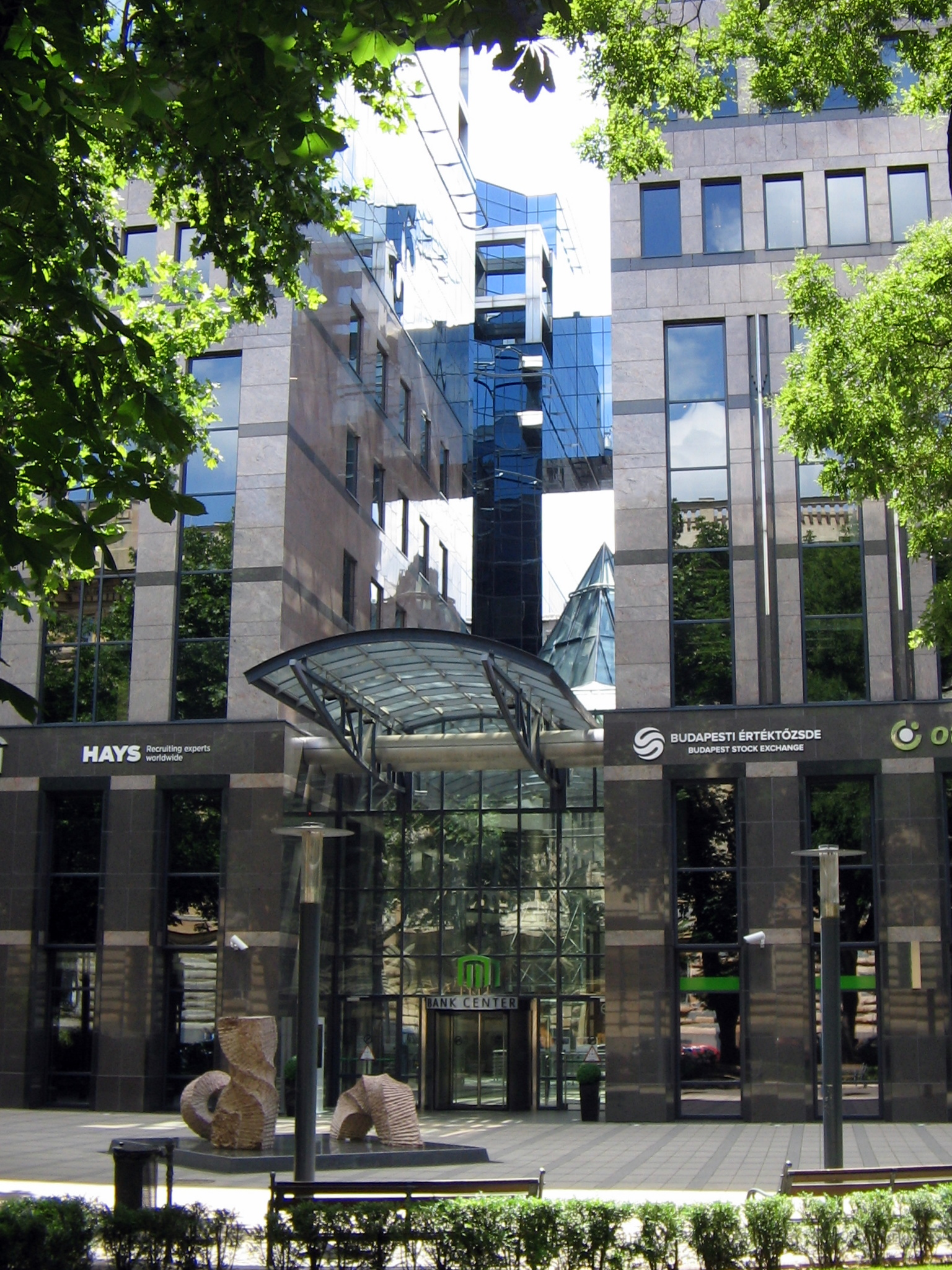
Building hosting the Embassy of Brazil in Budapest

== See also ==
- Foreign relations of Brazil
- Foreign relations of Hungary
- Hungarian Brazilians
