= Galo da Madrugada =

Carnival band in Recife, Brazil

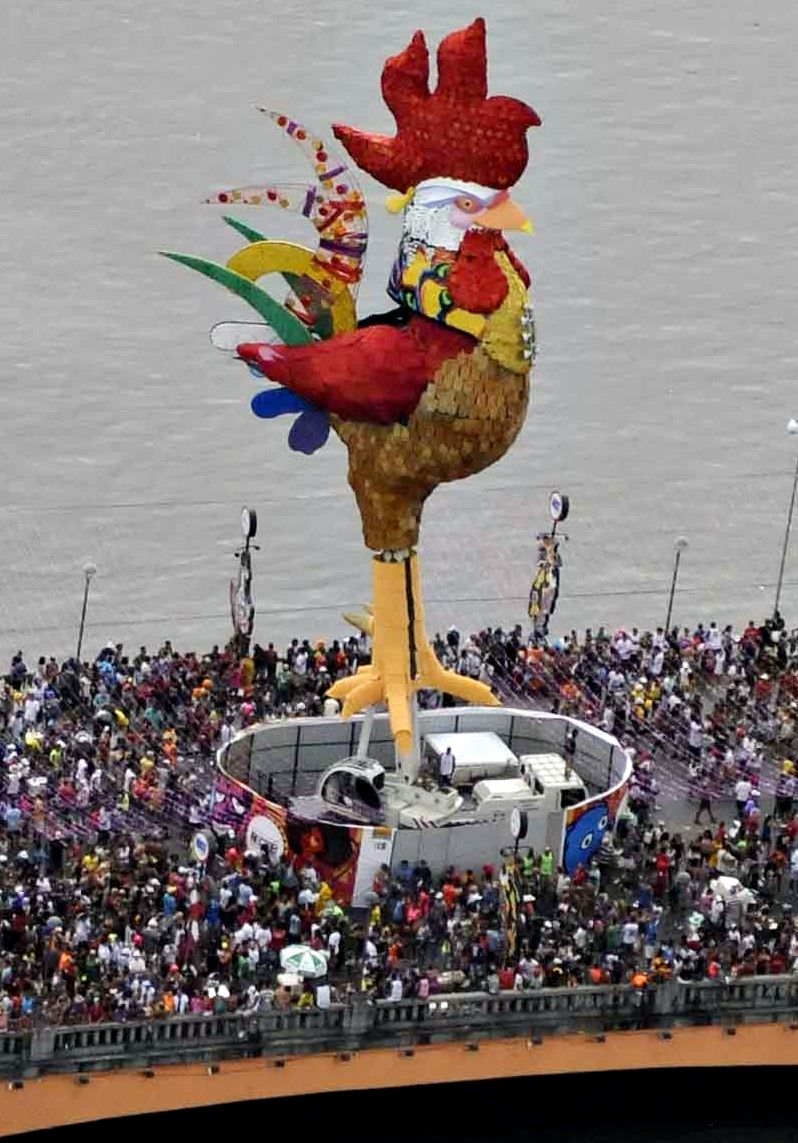
- Full name: Galo da Madrugada
- Nickname(s): Galo
- Foundation: January 24, 1978; 47 years ago
- Colors
- Symbol: Rooster
- Location: São José (Recife)
- President: Enéas Alves Freire

2020 presentation
- Title: Xilogravuras no Cordel do Frevo (Woodcut at Frevo's Cordel)
- Motif: The woodcut and Cordel literature culture of Pernambuco
- Presentation order: early morning of Saturday of Carnival (4 days before Ash Wednesday)

Website
- galodamadrugada.com.br

Galo da Madrugada (in Portuguese: Dawn's Rooster) is a carnival block from Recife, Brazil. The block was created in 1978 by Enéias Freire. Galos parades every Saturday of carnival at São José (Recife) neighborhood. The main rhythm is the frevo, but other rhythms are also played.

It is named in The Guinness Book of World Records as the biggest carnival parade in the world, considering the number of participants. In 2013, that number was more than 2,500,000 people. Its size is only matched by Cordão da Bola Preta in Rio de Janeiro.

Galo da Madrugada inspired the creation of other blocks throughout Brazil and in other countries, such as Pinto da Madrugada, in Maceió, Sapo da Madrugada, in Amazonas, Galinho de Brasília, in the capital of Brazil and Galo na Neve, in Canada, in addition, the year 2020 marked the debut of Bloco do Galo da Madrugada also in the city of São Paulo.

== Hino do Galo - Hymn of Galo ==
Ei pessoal, vem moçada
Carnaval começa no Galo da Madrugada
Ei pessoal, vem moçada
Carnaval começa no Galo da Madrugada

A manhã já vem surgindo
O sol clareia a cidade com seus raios de cristal
E o Galo da Madrugada
Já está na rua, saudando o Carnaval

Ei pessoal...

As donzelas estão dormindo
As flores recebendo o orvalho matinal
E o Galo da Madrugada
Já está na rua, saudando o Carnaval

Ei pessoal...

O Galo também é de briga
As esporas afiadas, e a crista é coral
E o Galo da Madrugada
Já está na rua, saudando o Carnaval
