= 2017 Brazilian general strike =

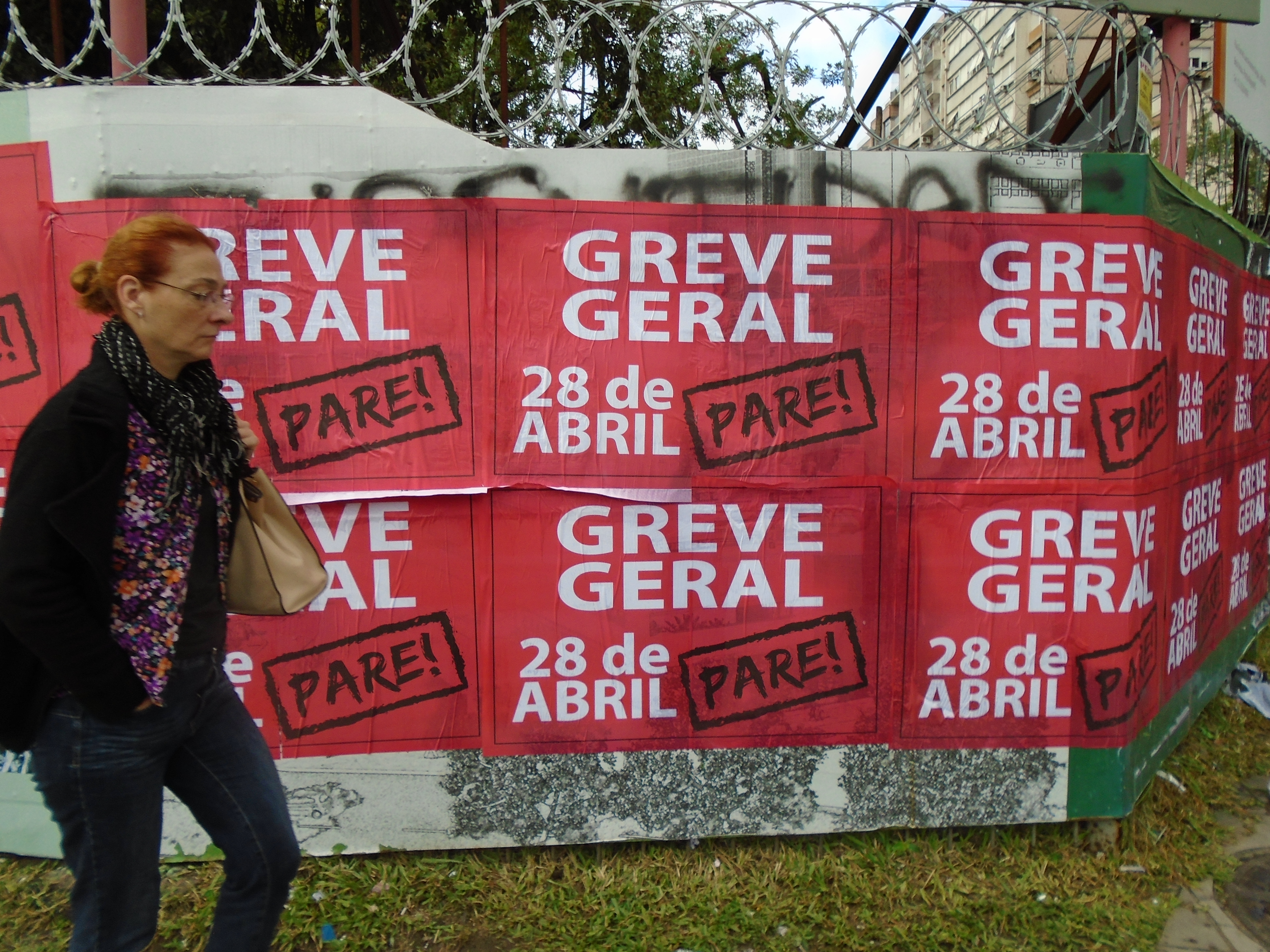
Posters announcing the strike, in Porto Alegre, Rio Grande do Sul

The 2017 Brazilian general strike took place on 28 April, 100 years after Brazil's first general strike in June 1917. The movement was a protest against reforms of labor laws, which were later adopted and social security proposed by Michel Temer government and pending in National Congress of Brazil.

More than 150 cities recorded stoppages, and according to the organizers, there were 40 million people, with no official admission balance or the number of protesters on the streets. With wide coverage in international media, the strike was minimized by the Brazilian press according to the journalist Paula Cesarino Costa, with emphasis given to conflicts between police and strikers. With diverse reactions, politicians who support the government reduced the impact of the strike while oppositionists defended it as popular expression. Political scientist Marco Antonio Teixeira, in an interview for the BBC, said that the strike was "smaller than organizers expected, but larger than the government would like".

== History ==
Several trade union centrals called for protests against new labor and social security laws proposals to the National Congress of Brazil by Michel Temer government. Supported by local unions, the strike was called by several trade unions. Other movements were also at the forefront of demonstrations, such as Landless Workers' Movement, Homeless Workers' Movement and National Union of Students.

The political parties that declared support or encouraged their militancy to appear on the streets were Worker's Party, Brazilian Socialist Party, Communist Party of Brazil, Socialism and Liberty Party, United Socialist Workers' Party, Brazilian Communist Party, Democratic Labor Party Solidarity and Sustainability Network. The strike was also supported by the Catholic Church in Brazil. Several bishops and priests summoned the faithful to protest against reforms. National Conference of Bishops of Brazil (CNBB) issued a note calling on Christians to fight "in order to seek the best for our people, especially the most fragile".

A military police officer from Goiás caused serious injuries to the university student Mateus Ferreira da Silva during a protest in the city of Goiânia. The aggression was photographed and filmed, with photos in sequence capturing the moment when the captain's baton Augusto Sampaio breaks when reaching the student's head. The student spent 11 days in the intensive care unit and suffered several fractures in the face, in addition to traumatic brain injury. The police officer was removed from external actions and awaits in administrative activities the conclusion of an investigation into the incident.

== Reactions ==
The strike had international repercussions and generated diverse reactions among journalists, government officials and political scientists, whereas, according to the Folha de S.Paulo ombudsman, national coverage was minimized and exacerbated conflicts between demonstrators and police forces.

The president Michel Temer criticized acts of violence. The former Minister of Justice, Osmar Serraglio, said that the strike would have failed. Politicians who supported the government criticized the strike and its motives, while opposition politicians supported it as a backing of the popular will. João Doria Junior, mayor of São Paulo, fought the strike stating in a social network that "Friday is a day of work". Free Brazil Movement also strongly campaigned against it, saying that demonstrators depend on the union tax. The union centrals have classified the strike as the biggest of the last decades, counting on the adhesion of 40 million people.

The political scientist Milton Lahuerta said that the strike represented "an expression of indignation". Already for the journalist Merval Pereira, the strike would not be a popular uprising, but of unions that would be "losing perks". The Rádio Jovem Pan declared that "there was no general strike" and that "in fact, the strike failed": "There were only small pickets of people who tried to stop Brazil".

== See also ==
- 2014 Brazilian economic crisis
- Brazil labor reform (2017)
- Brazil Fiscal reform (2016)
- Outsourcing law in Brazil
- 2016–2017 Brazilian protests
