= Tamás Szmrecsányi =

Brazilian economist, historian and professor

Personal details
- Born: 1936 Budapest, Hungary
- Died: 16 February 2009 (aged 72–73)
- Cause of death: Pancreatic cancer
- Education: University of Sao Paulo, State University of Campinas, Oxford University

Tamás József Károly Márton Szmrecsányi (1936 – 2009) was a Hungarian-born Brazilian economist, historian and professor.

He fled as a child with his family as a refugee to Brazil when he was 14 years old, fleeing from the conflict of World War II. He studied philosophy at the University of Sao Paulo, earned a doctoral degree and a post-doctorate in economics at the State University of Campinas and the University of Oxford, respectively. He has written not only on economics, but also on the History of Brazil, Agricultural Economics, History of Economic Thought and the History of Science. He has worked as a professor in the State University of Campinas and gave classes in France and Ecuador for many years until his death.

Szmrecsányi had been the founder of the Association of Research in Economic History of Brazil in 1993, and has worked with other known economists of hist time, such as Wilson Suzigan, Flávio Saes, Luiz Carlos Soares, and others.

He died at 72 years of age from Pancreatic cancer, and was survived by three of his children.
