= Centre of People's Movements =

- Central de Movimentos Populares
- Abbreviation: CMP
- Formation: October 1993
- Legal status: Social movement
- Purpose: housing, health, minority rights, solidarity economy, among others

The Centre of People's Movements or Popular Movements Central (Portuguese: Central de Movimentos Populares, CMP) is a Brazilian left-wing social movement organization that articulate various social urban movements in their common and general struggles, such as housing, health, women, blacks, solidarity economy, among others.

Founded after a national meeting of social movements in Belo Horizonte in 1993, the CPM is the fruit of a historic process of resistance by several combative popular social movements for social struggles during the 1980s, such as the defense of the right to the city and a Brazilian democratic project for the country able to guarantee wide social involvement. The need to create a toll able to coordinate and to join forces between various social movements in the struggle for rights and for the construction of public policies was the main purpose of creating the CPM, and continues as a guiding principle of its performance.

Thereafter, the CPM starts to get involved in some of the main social struggles in Brazil, such the Cry of the Excluded, national campaign and caravans in defense of rights, demonstrations against the implementation of privatization and neoliberal agenda, and marches to promote employment and the economic and social development.

In recent years, it also played an important role as one of the leftist and social organization involved in protests against the impeachment of former president Dilma Rousseff and in the Free Lula movement.

== See also ==
- Landless Workers' Movement
