= Serpentine streamer =

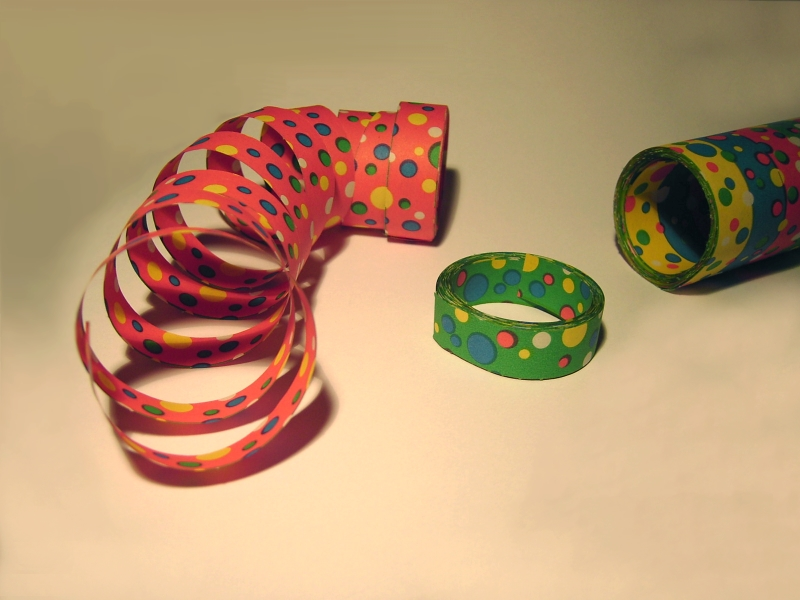
Multicolored serpentine

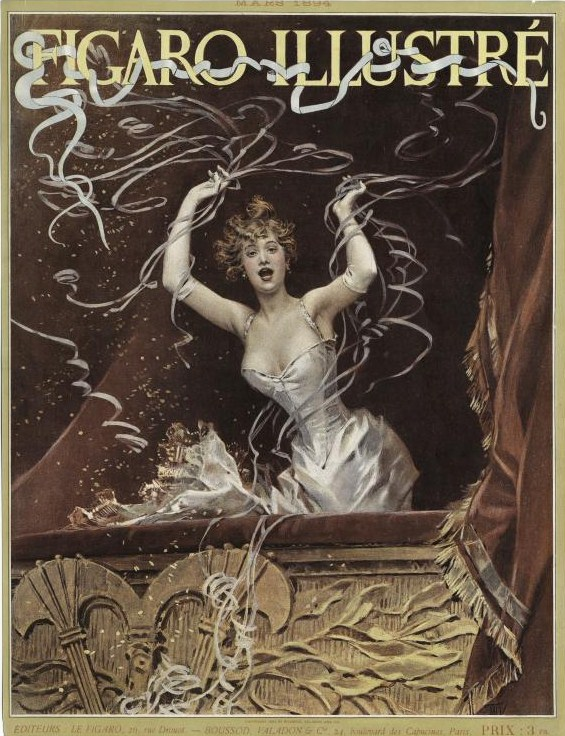
Femme lançant des serpentins (1894)

A serpentine streamer is a type of party accessory made out of long strips of paper, wound up in a roll, which form snakelike patterns in the air when thrown. Serpentine streamers can also be used as party decorations, usually hung up from the ceiling across the room, as they form visually appealing serpentines.

Serpentine streamers can be used as party favors. The streamers usually come in rolls that contain multiple strips. They have to be separated into smaller rolls before use.

== Usage ==
The most basic technique of using a party streamer is to take the streamer and pull it out of its roll. A less known technique is to blow inside the roll, making the streamer flow out on the current of air. The roll can also be cut across to produce confetti.

Party streamer guns exist, which aid in deploying party streamers.

== Alternatives ==
Several items can perform a similar function. As party accessories, confetti and silly string can be used. As decorations, a garland can be used.
