= Carnival block =

Street bands that mobilize crowds during Brazilian Carnival

Carnival blocks, carnaval blocos or blocos de rua are street parties, parades and street bands that mobilize crowds during carnival season and are the main popular expression of Brazilian Carnival. The parades fall under the term "street carnival", and happen during a period of about one month, beginning before and finishing after Carnival. Blocos usually perform Brazilian rhythms, such as marchinha, samba, frevo, maracatu, and axé.

== Rio de Janeiro ==
Street carnival blocos have become a mainstay of Rio's Carnival, and today, there are several hundred blocos. Block parades start in January, and may last until the Sunday after Carnival. Carnaval Blocos are found throughout Rio de Janeiro. One of the largest and oldest blocos is Cordão do Bola Preta, based in downtown Rio. Other large groups include Banda de Ipanema and Monobloco. The block Sargento Pimenta performs Beatles songs using Brazilian rhythms.

== Recife and Olinda ==
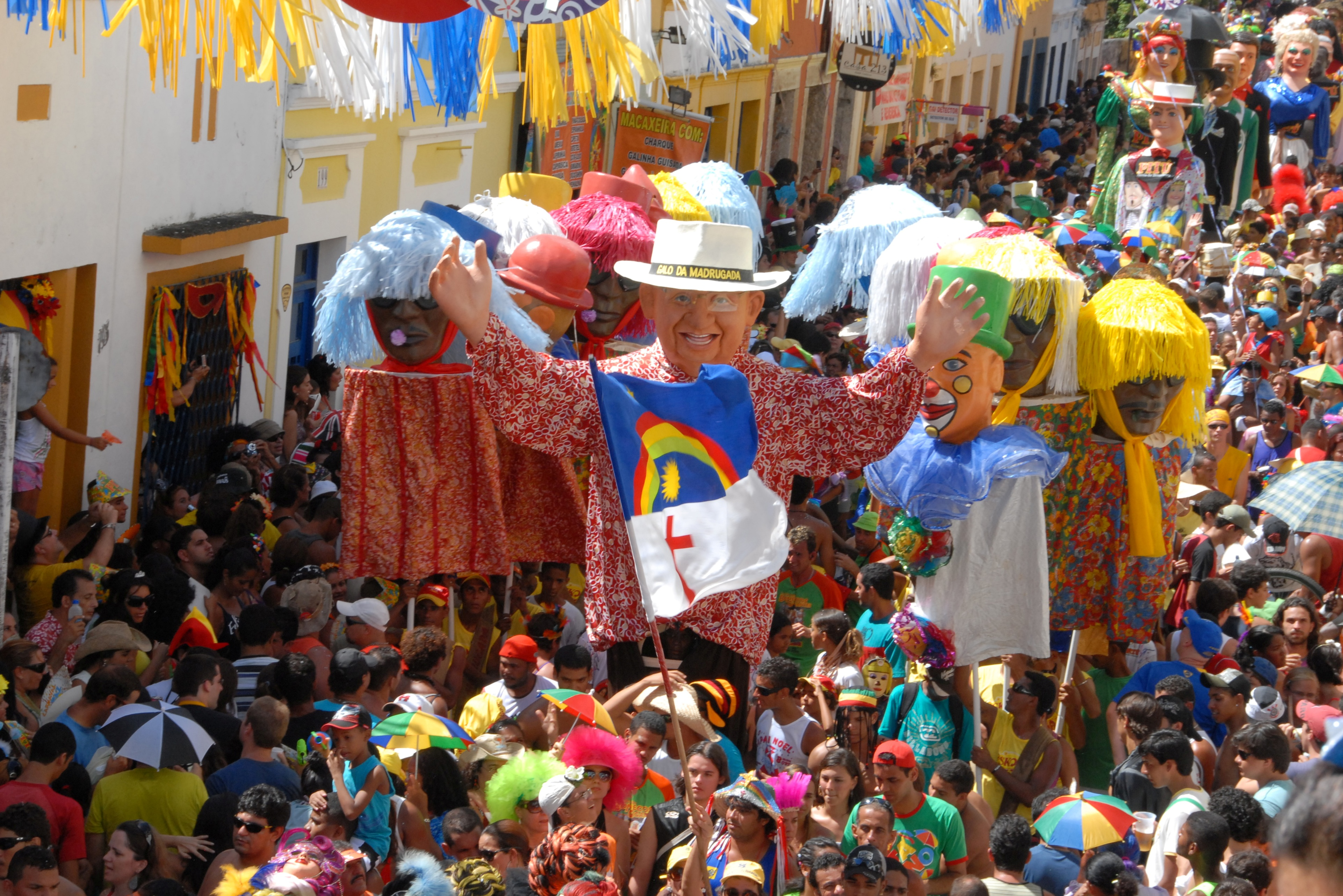
Giants dolls of Olinda, Pernambuco

In Recife, the carnival block Galo da Madrugada was registered in the Guinness Book of World Records as the biggest carnival parade in the world. In its 2013 parade, the crowd following the bloco was larger than 2,500,000 people).

Besides Galo da Madrugada, thousands of others carnival blocks with sizes ranging from few hundred to millions of people, perform in the streets of Recife and Olinda including As Virgens de Olinda, Eu Acho É Pouco, Batutas de São José, Lenhadores, Pitombeiras, Segura o Talo, Bloco da Saudade, Enquanto Isso Na Sala de Justiça and O Homem da Meia-Noite.

== Minas Gerais ==
Blocks are the most traditional parading type in Minas Gerais. Zé Pereira dos Lacaios in Ouro Preto, founded in 1867, is the oldest block still active in Brazil.

== See also ==
- Samba school
- Sambodromo
