= 2014 protests in Brazil =

Protests against the 2014 FIFA World Cup

2014 Brazil FIFA World Cup protests
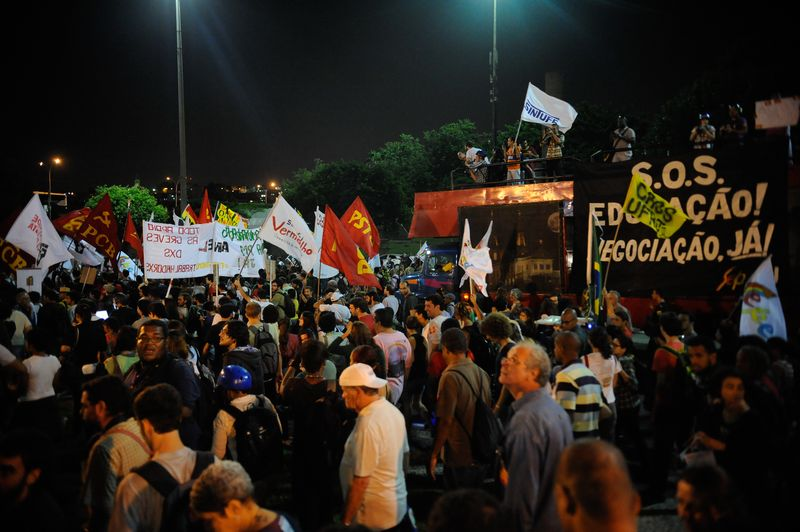
- Protesters against the World Cup march in the center of Rio de Janeiro.
- Date: June 2013 - July 2014
- Location: Brazil
- Caused by: Perceived injustices around 2014 FIFA World Cup expenditures, forced removals of poor habitations, low spending on public services
- Goals: • Worker reivindications, • Better housing, • End of the forced removals, • Free and good-quality Public services, • End of the UPP, • End of urban militarization, • End to Police brutality
- Methods: • Strikes, • Barricades, • Demonstrations, • Occupations, • Autodefense of masses, • protest marches, • online activism, • direct action
- Status: Major protests subsided

Number
Over 1 million	

Casualties
- Injuries: 42
- Arrested: 234 on 16 May

The 2014 protests in Brazil, also known as There won't be a Cup (Brazilian Portuguese: Não vai ter Copa) or Fifa go home were public demonstrations in several Brazilian cities in response to the 2014 FIFA World Cup and other social issues, done by many social movements, mostly in the capitals where the megaevent was happening, Their main criticism was the high government spending on the World Cup to the detriment of low investment in public services. Furthermore, they criticized forced evictions and lack of policies in favor of decent housing, urban militarization and police violence. Several categories of workers also added demands in favor of better conditions for work.

== Background ==
The protests were primarily concerned with the spending of billions of reais of public money on stadiums for the World Cup.

Prior to 2014, social movements opposed to Brazil hosting the Cup garnered support during the FIFA Confederations Cup in 2013. The Facebook group Movimento Anti-Copa de Decoração de Ruas (Anti-Cup Movement for the Decoration of the Streets) gained more than 15,000 Likes in a little over a month.

== Timeline ==
=== Events prior to the World Cup ===
On 25 January 2014, protesters clashed with the military police in central São Paulo. According to the organization's official Facebook account, 108 people were arrested by military police and a further 20 arrests were made by civil police, totaling 128 arrests before midnight.

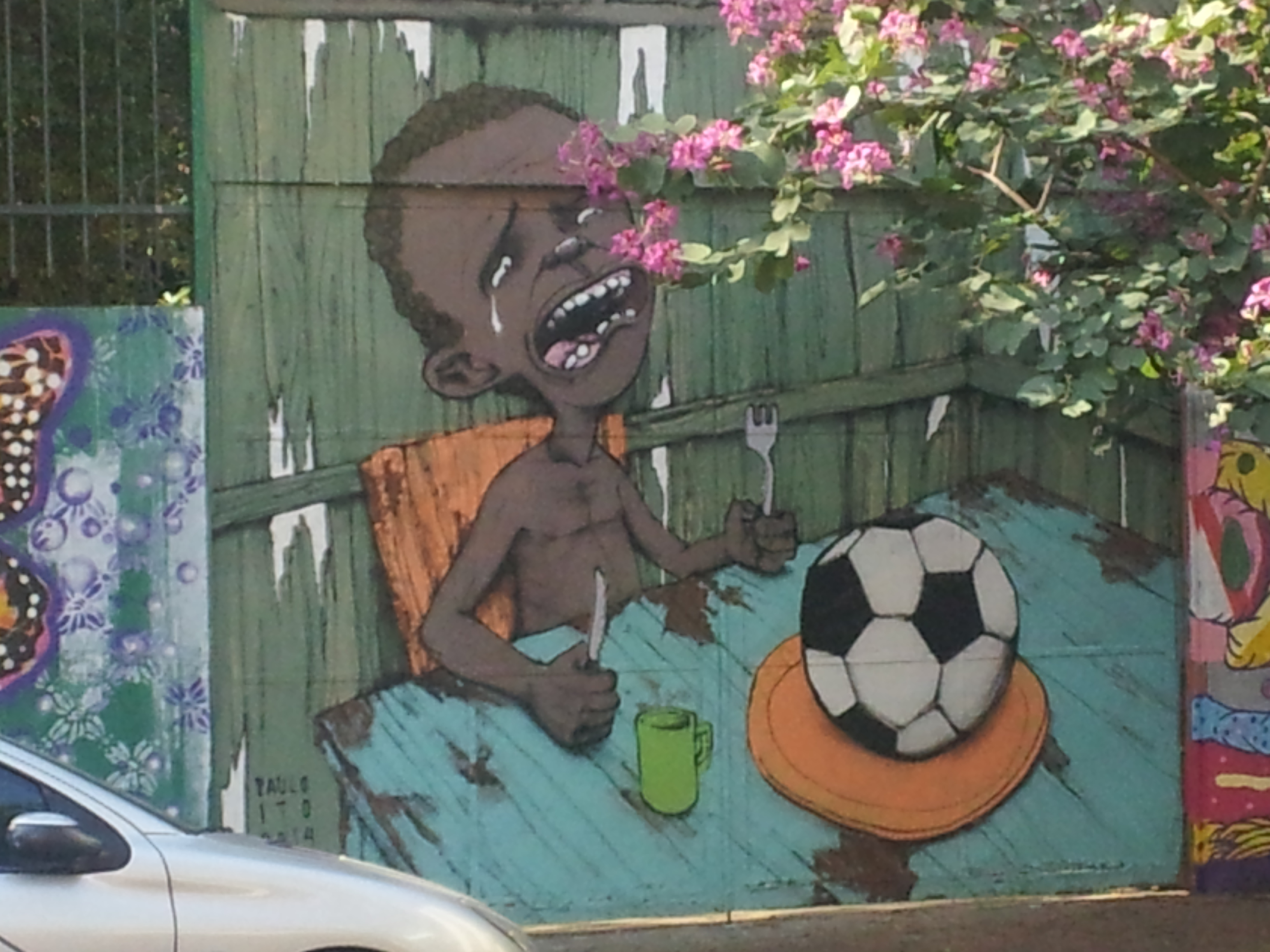
Graffiti in São Paulo critical of the expenditures of the World Cup.

On 27 May, 2 protesters blocked the streets in central Brasília, near the Monumental Axis, caused traffic congestion. Among the protesters were 300 aboriginals who went to the capital to protest changes in laws concerning the demarcation of indigenous land. The protest ended in a confrontation with the military police, where a cavalryman was struck by an arrow.

On 31 May 2014 protesters marched from the Ministries Esplanade to the football stadium before ending the demonstration peacefully. The following day, military police in São Paulo began using specialized suits of armor referred to as 'RoboCop', which were intended to maintain control over protests during the World Cup.

On 3 June, a group of about 50 protesters in Goiânia gathered in front of the hotel where the Brazilian team was staying prior to an exhibition match against Panama. The protesters were connected with trade unions and left wing political groups, with pickets demanding fair pay for professors and health professionals.

=== Events during the World Cup ===
Arrest of protesters against the FIFA World Cup 2014 in São Paulo

The demonstrations of 2014 were generally smaller than those that occurred during the FIFA Confederations Cup in the previous year, but protesters and police clashed in almost every city hosting the games of the World Cup. In the first week of the Cup, there were more than 20 protests and 180 arrests across the various cities, many resulting in police action.

On 12 June, at least six were injured in São Paulo when military police threw gas grenades and fired rubber bullets at protesters. Two CNN journalists were among those injured. Governor Geraldo Alckmin of the Brazilian Social Democracy Party justified the aggression of the military police saying that their goal was to prevent the protesters from blocking a major traffic artery leading to the football stadium.

In Porto Alegre on 24 June, around 200 protesters gathered in the city center and travelled toward the airport. The group was monitored by police, and disbursed with one protester being arrested for deflating the tires of a car.

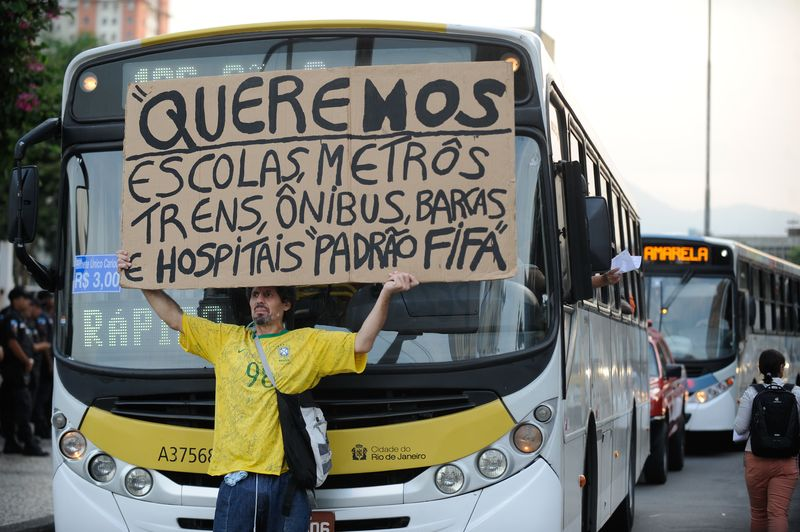
Protester holding a sign contrasting the quality of soccer stadiums with the quality of public services.

In São Paulo, 23 June, an unidentified man in a black shirt fired a gun three times into the air as police were arresting a protester. Protesters say that the man was trying to scare away those critical of the arrest. Police said they would investigate whether the shooter was actually a member of the police. Three people were arrested during the act, among which Rafael Lusvarghi.

On 13 July, the final day of the Cup, police in Rio de Janeiro injured at least ten journalists with clubs, and shrapnel from tear gas grenades. Police kettled the 300 protesters, preventing them from marching to their destination, Maracanã Stadium. Military Police told BBC Brazil that they would forward reports of police abuse to Internal Affairs.

== Events ==
Reasons of the protest continuation are pointed also by Romário, ex-player and member of the Parliament, that dubbed the World Cup 2014 as the "biggest theft in history", and that the real costs would be over R$100 billion (US$46 billion). Romário now is one of the few parliament members that wants a deeper investigation on the misuse of public funds.

Before the opening game of the World Cup on 12 June, police clashed with protesters in São Paulo, Rio de Janeiro and several other host cities. Tear gas was used on crowds in São Paulo.

While covering the protest on 12 June, CNN Reporter Shasta Darlington and CNN producer Barbara Arvanitidis were injured. Barbara Arvanitidis was directly hit on the wrist by a tear gas bomb whilst they were reporting the indiscriminate use of riot weapons.

== See also ==
- List of protests in the 21st century
