= Socialist Youth Union (Brazil) =

Brazilian youth organization

The Socialist Youth Union (Portuguese: União da Juventude Socialista, UJS), founded 1984, is the youth organization of the Communist Party of Brazil.
