= Marchinha =

Music genre popular in Brazil

Gosto, mas não é muito
Marchinha "Gosto, mas não é muito" composed by Francisco Alves e Ismael Silva, recorded in 1933 by Francisco Alves.

Marchinha (Portuguese pronunciation: [maʁˈʃiɲɐ], also called "marchinha de carnaval", "marchinha carnavalesca" or "marcha carnavalesca) is one of several genres of music typical of Brazilian Carnival in Rio de Janeiro and Southeast Region of Brazil. The other main carnival genres are: samba-enredo, frevo, maracatu and Axé music.

Marchinha is an extremely comic genre of music and the very name "marchinha" (little march) satirizes the seriousness of military marches, in both the musical and step senses, which are involved in the generalised satirization of the society that occurs during the carnival, for example the election of Rei Momo (King Momo, the king of carnival). The bands feature trombones, tubas, horns, clarinets, flutes and piccolos and percussion.

The first marchinha was the composition (in 1899) of Chiquinha Gonzaga entitled "O Abre Alas", made to the Cordão Carnavalesco "Rosa de Outro".

Marchinhas are composed and played to date by the blocos carnavalescos every year, in the "street carnival" of Rio de Janeiro.
