= North Williams Avenue =

Street in Portland, Oregon, United States

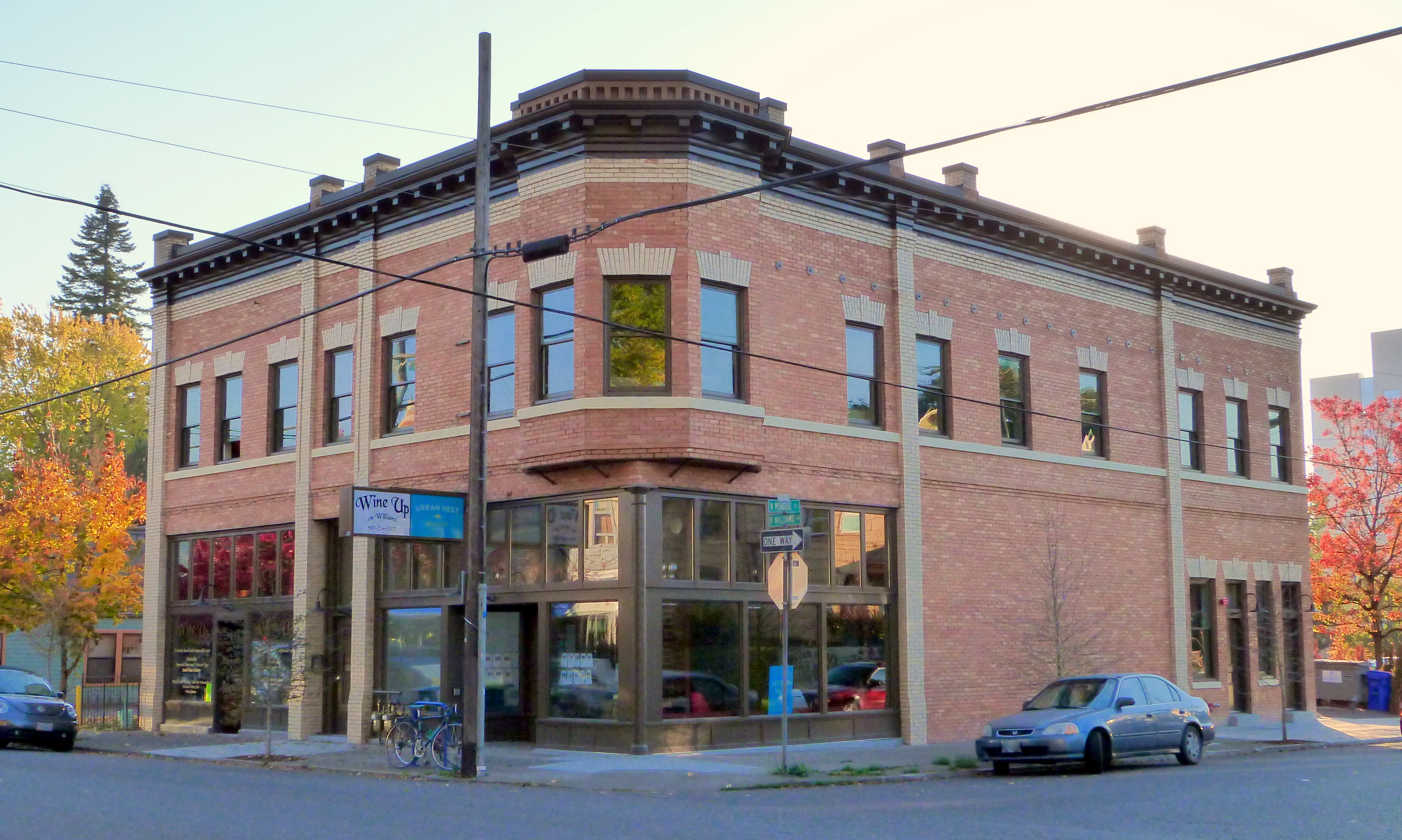
- The Rinehart Building on North Williams Avenue
- Interactive map of North Williams Avenue
- Part of: North Portland; Albina
- Namesake: George Henry Williams
- Maintained by: City of Portland
- Length: 3.3 miles (5.3 km)
- Width: 40 feet (12 m)
- Location: Portland, Oregon
- Postal code: 97211, 97217, 97227
- North end: North Winchell Street 45.580140°N 122.666807°W
- South end: North Winning Way 45.533101°N 122.666790°W

North Williams Avenue is a north–south street located in Portland, Oregon, United States, and it defines the eastern boundary of North Portland. North Williams Avenue stretches from its southern terminus at Northeast Winning Way, near the Moda Center, to its northern terminus at North Winchell Street, a distance of 3.3 miles (5.3 km). It is a street common to the Portland neighborhoods Eliot, Boise, Humboldt, and Piedmont.

== History ==
The town of Albina, Oregon, was platted in 1872 by Edwin Russell, William Page, and George Williams, and streets were named for each of the founders. Albina expanded northward in successive plats, resulting in slight misalignments of Williams Avenue at Alberta Street and Dekum Street. In 1891 Albina was annexed into Portland.

In the early 20th century, property owners and politicians sought to restrict access to nonwhites in most residential areas in Portland. In 1919 the Portland Realty Board declared that selling property in a white neighborhood to Negro or Chinese people was unethical, and by 1940, half of Portland's Black community lived in the North Williams Avenue area. The street became known as the central hub of African American Portland.

A redevelopment plan in the late 1980s caused a gradual shift in demographics along North Williams Avenue and the surrounding area. One stretch of the avenue began to carry 3,000 bicycle commuters per day, making the street a vital artery for non-motorized traffic, but changes along North Williams Avenue were not always well received.

== Historic resources ==
Three sites listed with the National Register of Historic Places are located on North Williams Avenue, the Rinehart Building, the Charles Crook House, and the Henry C. and Wilhemina Bruening House. Moreover, the Portland Historic Resources Inventory of 1984 counted 26 sites of interest on North Williams Avenue.

== Public transportation ==
North Williams Avenue is served by TriMet lines 4 and 44.

== Media references ==
"Williams Avenue" is a song by the Portland band, Quarterflash. It is track #9 on the album, Quarterflash.

== See also ==
- List of streets in Portland, Oregon
