= Bruening =

Bruening is a surname. Notable people with the surname include:

- Adolph von Bruening (1837–1884), German chemist
- Justin Bruening (born 1979), American actor and former fashion model
- Kay Stearns Bruening, American dietician and academic administrator
- Alexa Havins (born 1980), American actress, wife of Justin

== See also ==
- Henry C. and Wilhelmina Bruening House, in Portland, Oregon
