= Frederick Armbruster Cottage =

Historic building in Portland, Oregon, U.S.

- U.S. National Register of Historic Places
- Portland Historic Landmark
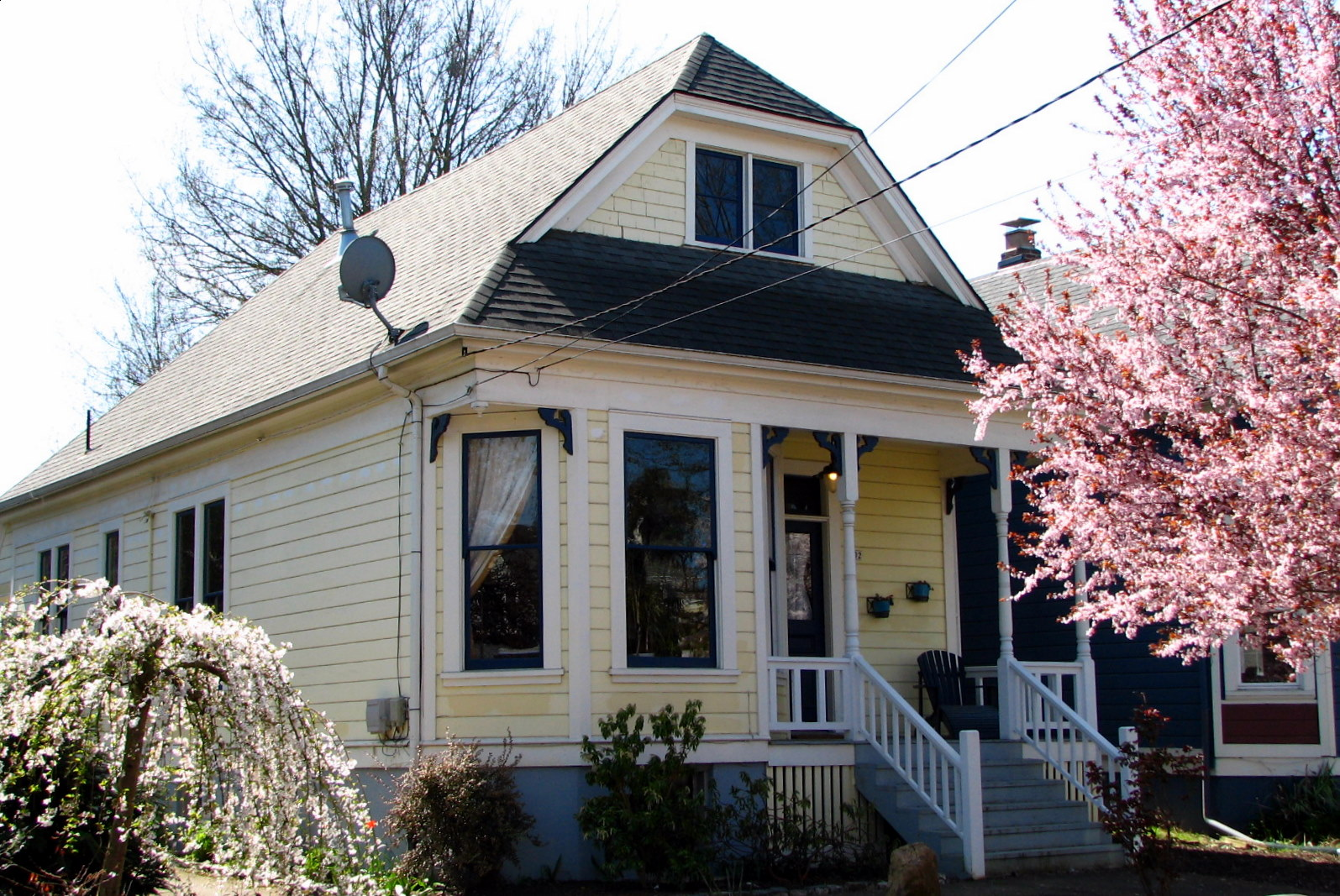
- The Armbruster Cottage in 2009

- Location within the United States Location within Oregon Location within Portland, Oregon
- Location: 502 NE Tillamook Street; Portland, Oregon
- Coordinates: 45°32′16″N 122°39′38″W
- Built: 1898
- Built by: David McKeen
- Architectural style: Queen Anne, with Shingle and vernacular details
- MPS: Eliot Neighborhood MPS
- NRHP reference No.: 01000130
- Added to NRHP: February 16, 2001

The Frederick Armbruster Cottage is a historic residence located in the Eliot neighborhood of Portland, Oregon, United States. Built in 1898, it is a locally-important example of the application of the Queen Anne style to simple housing for the European immigrant and working class families that flowed into the neighborhood during the 1880s to early 1900s. The German American Armbruster family operated a pretzel baking business from the back yard for nearly 30 years.

The house was inscribed on the National Register of Historic Places in 2001.

== See also ==
- National Register of Historic Places listings in Northeast Portland, Oregon
