= National Register of Historic Places listings in North Portland, Oregon =

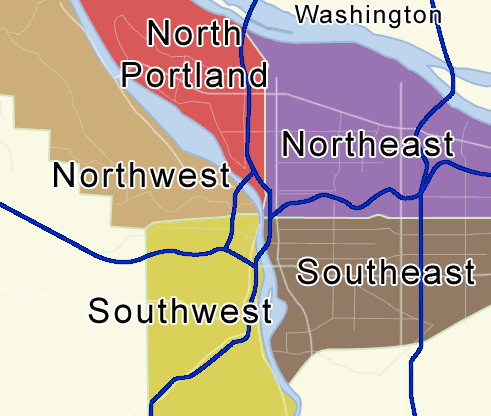
Locator map showing five of Portland's six quadrants. Click a quadrant to go to its National Register list. (South Portland listings are included on the Southwest Portland list.)

This list presents the full set of buildings, structures, objects, sites, or districts designated on the National Register of Historic Places in North Portland, Oregon, United States, and offers brief descriptive information about each of them. The National Register recognizes places of national, state, or local historic significance across the United States. Out of over 90,000 National Register sites nationwide, Oregon is home to over 2,000, and over one-fourth of those are found partially or wholly in Portland. While these sites are widely spread across all six of Portland's quadrants, heavy concentrations are found in the Downtown and Southwest Hills neighborhoods of the Southwest quadrant, and the Northwest District neighborhood of the Northwest quadrant.

Only historic places within the municipal boundaries of Portland are shown in this list and its four companion lists for the other quadrants. Some sites beyond city limits will appear in other lists showing "Portland" as a general locality, but are excluded here. Although Portland's legal boundaries extend into Clackamas and Washington counties, all of the city's National Register sites lie within Multnomah County.

This National Park Service list is complete through NPS recent listings posted August 29, 2025.

== Current listings ==
	Name on the Register	Image	Date listed	Location	Description
1	Broadway Bridge	Broadway Bridge	November 14, 2012 (#12000930)	Spanning the Willamette River at river mile 11.7; 45°31′55″N 122°40′26″W	This is the largest example of a Rall-type bascule bridge ever constructed, and one of only three such designs still extant in the United States. Completed in 1913, it was an important step in the development of Portland's transportation system, as the city's first Willamette River bridge built on an entirely new alignment in the 20th century.
2	Henry C. and Wilhemina Bruening House	Henry C. and Wilhemina Bruening House	November 27, 2004 (#04001264)	5919 N Williams Avenue; 45°33′58″N 122°40′02″W	
3	Paul Bunyan Statue	Paul Bunyan Statue	January 28, 2009 (#08001393)	Corner of N Denver Avenue and N Interstate Avenue; 45°35′02″N 122°41′12″W	This 31-foot (9.4 m) sculpture of folkloric logger Paul Bunyan in Portland's Kenton neighborhood was built in 1959 to commemorate the centennial of Oregon's statehood during the Centennial Exposition and International Trade Fair. Its steel skeleton and detailed, painted-plaster sheathing were crafted by local companies and tradesmen, and it was prominently placed on Interstate Avenue at what was then the main northern gateway to Portland. Reflecting Oregon's tradition of rugged individualism and identification with the timber industry, the statue is an outstanding example of 20th-century, novelty roadside architecture.
4	David Cole House	David Cole House	August 6, 1980 (#80003361)	1441 N McClellan Street; 45°35′00″N 122°40′56″W	
5	Charles Crook House	Charles Crook House	February 21, 1997 (#97000130)	6127 N Williams Avenue; 45°34′02″N 122°40′02″W	
6	Davis Block	Davis Block	March 18, 1999 (#99000360)	801–813 N Russell Street; 45°32′28″N 122°40′29″W	
7	Elliott House	Elliott House	September 21, 2005 (#05001058)	2022 N Willamette Boulevard; 45°33′42″N 122°41′17″W	
8	Hryszko Brothers Building	Hryszko Brothers Building	July 31, 1998 (#98000950)	836 N Russell Street; 45°32′27″N 122°40′32″W	
9	Jean (steamboat)	Jean (steamboat)	August 8, 1989 (#89001001)	North Portland Harbor; 45°36′31″N 122°41′19″W	
10	Peter Jeppesen House	Peter Jeppesen House	September 10, 1987 (#87001535)	4107 N Albina Avenue; 45°33′13″N 122°40′29″W	
11	Kenton Commercial Historic District	Kenton Commercial Historic District	September 3, 2001 (#01000934)	Roughly along N Denver Avenue, from N Willis Street to N Watts Street; 45°34′57″N 122°41′13″W	
12	Kenton Hotel	Kenton Hotel	October 16, 1990 (#90001522)	8303–8319 N Denver Avenue; 45°35′00″N 122°41′14″W	
13	Dr. John D. Marshall Building	Dr. John D. Marshall Building	June 13, 2023 (#100009052)	2337 North Williams Ave. 45°32′24″N 122°40′00″W	
14	Memorial Coliseum	Memorial Coliseum	September 10, 2009 (#09000707)	1401 N Wheeler Avenue; 45°31′56″N 122°40′10″W	
15	John Mock House	John Mock House	February 15, 1980 (#80003370)	4333 N Willamette Boulevard; 45°34′32″N 122°42′43″W	
16	Mount Hood Masonic Temple	Mount Hood Masonic Temple	May 29, 2008 (#08000473)	5308 N Commercial Avenue; 45°33′43″N 122°40′15″W	
17	John Palmer House	John Palmer House	March 8, 1978 (#78002320)	4314 N Mississippi Avenue; 45°33′18″N 122°40′31″W	
18	Thomas M. and Alla M. Paterson House	Thomas M. and Alla M. Paterson House	March 5, 1998 (#98000202)	7807 N Denver Avenue; 45°34′47″N 122°41′14″W	
19	Patton Home	Patton Home	February 10, 2021 (#100006125)	4619 N Michigan Avenue; 45°33′23″N 122°40′39″W	
20	Portland Van and Storage Building	Portland Van and Storage Building	February 22, 1996 (#96000125)	407 N Broadway; 45°32′02″N 122°40′15″W	
21	PT-658 (motor torpedo boat)	PT-658 (motor torpedo boat)	September 4, 2012 (#12000602)	6735 Basin Avenue; 45°34′11″N 122°43′11″W	
22	Rinehart Building	Rinehart Building	December 24, 2013 (#13000982)	3037–3041 N Williams Avenue; 45°32′43″N 122°40′01″W	
23	St. Johns Signal Tower Gas Station	St. Johns Signal Tower Gas Station	November 21, 2003 (#03001186)	8302 N Lombard Street; 45°35′21″N 122°45′08″W	
24	Smithson and McKay Brothers Blocks	Smithson and McKay Brothers Blocks	August 10, 1979 (#79002140)	921–949 N Russell Street; 45°32′28″N 122°40′36″W	
25	Frederick Torgler Building	Frederick Torgler Building	March 18, 1999 (#99000357)	816–820 N Russell Street; 45°32′27″N 122°40′30″W	
26	U.S. Post Office – St. Johns Station	U.S. Post Office – St. Johns Station	March 4, 1985 (#85000543)	8720 N Ivanhoe Street; 45°35′25″N 122°45′24″W	This Depression-era, small community post office in the Georgian style, with Colonial Revival elements, was completed in 1933. It is unusual among small Oregon post offices in that it was designed by a local architect, Francis Marion Stokes.
27	USS LCI-713 (Landing Craft)	USS LCI-713 (Landing Craft)	April 12, 2007 (#07000300)	1401 N Hayden Island Drive; 45°36′56″N 122°40′45″W	(Ed. note: see )
28	Vancouver Avenue First Baptist Church	Vancouver Avenue First Baptist Church	September 6, 2016 (#16000604)	3138 N Vancouver Avenue; 45°32′45″N 122°40′04″W	
29	Vancouver–Portland Bridge	Vancouver–Portland Bridge	July 16, 1982 (#82004205)	Spanning the Columbia River on Interstate 5 northbound 45°37′04″N 122°40′30″W	Historic Bridges and Tunnels in Washington TR
30	Villa St. Rose	Villa St. Rose	November 22, 2000 (#00001427)	597 N Dekum Street; 45°34′19″N 122°40′22″W	
31	West Coast Woods Model Home	West Coast Woods Model Home	September 14, 2002 (#02000969)	7211 N Fowler Avenue; 45°34′31″N 122°42′26″W	
32	West Hall	West Hall	September 22, 1977 (#77001114)	5000 N Willamette Boulevard; 45°34′18″N 122°43′28″W	
33	Williams Avenue YWCA	Williams Avenue YWCA	July 1, 2020 (#100005333)	6 N Tillamook Street; 45°32′16″N 122°40′01″W	
34	Wilson–Chambers Mortuary	Wilson–Chambers Mortuary	April 5, 2007 (#07000263)	430 N Killingsworth Street; 45°33′45″N 122°40′15″W	
35	John Yeon Speculative House	John Yeon Speculative House	August 1, 2007 (#07000771)	3922 N Lombard Street; 45°34′37″N 122°42′27″W	One of a series of speculative houses by native Oregon architect and conservationist John Yeon following the critically acclaimed Watzek House (1937). The series included nine houses built between 1938 and 1940 in Lake Oswego and Portland. The houses used a modular design concept that pioneered the use of external plywood as a building material and separate ventilation louvers, which allowed for series of fixed pane glass to be inset between vertical mullions. Yeon is frequently cited as one of the originators of what became known as the Northwest Regional style of architecture.

== Former listing ==
	Name on the Register	Image	Date listed	Date removed	Location	Description
1	C. W. Parker Four-Row Park Carousel	C. W. Parker Four-Row Park Carousel	August 26, 1987 (#87001381)	January 4, 2008	1492 Jantzen Beach Center	Removed from National Register in 2008 by request of owner. Put in storage in 2012 due to remodeling in the vicinity.

== See also ==
- National Register of Historic Places listings in Oregon
- National Register of Historic Places listings in Multnomah County, Oregon
- Listings in neighboring counties: Clackamas, Clark, Columbia, Hood River, Skamania, Washington
- Historic preservation
- History of Portland, Oregon
- Lists of Oregon-related topics
