= Dean's Beauty Salon and Barber Shop =

Historic building in Portland, Oregon, U.S.

- U.S. National Register of Historic Places
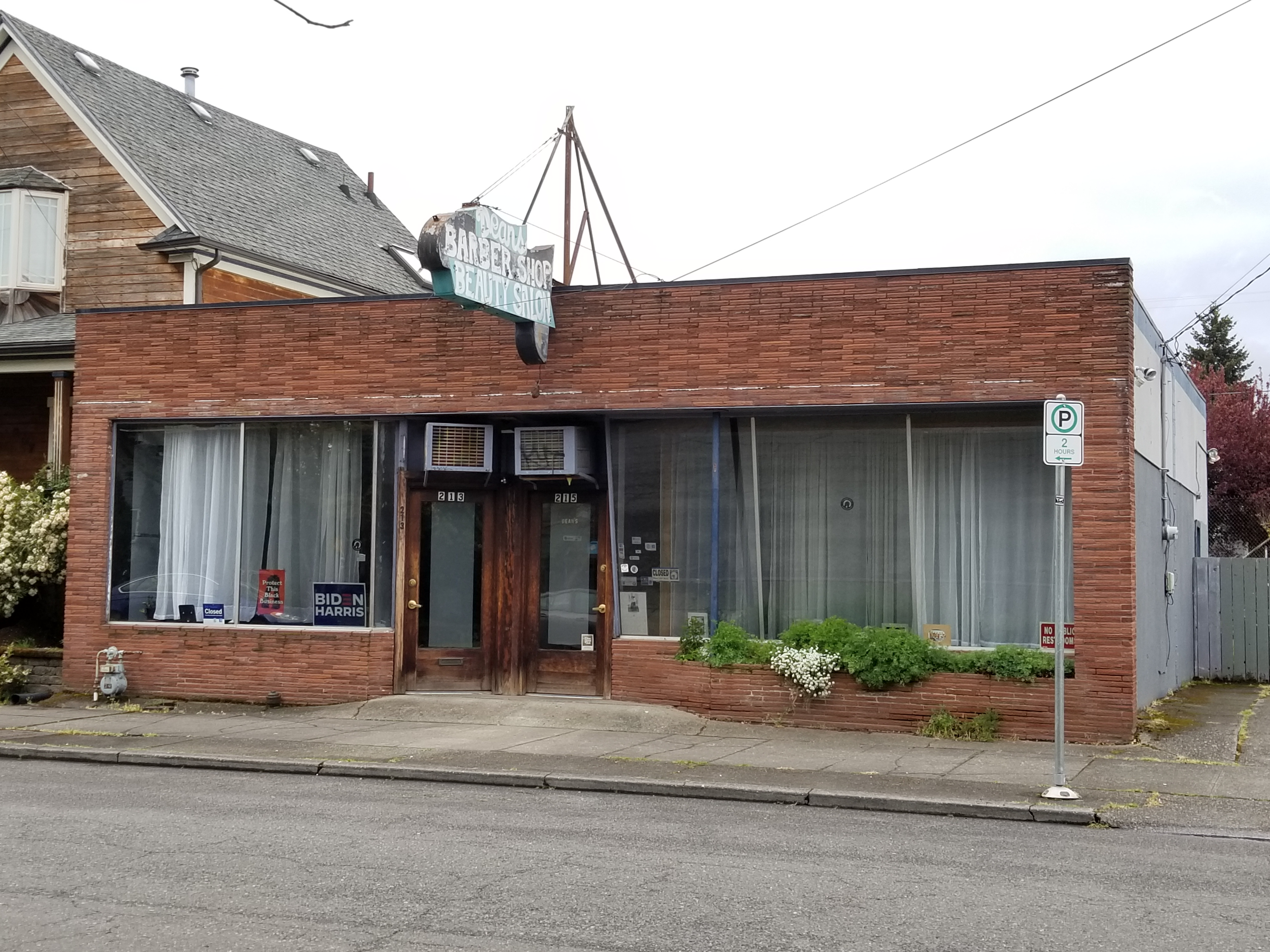
- The building's exterior in 2022

- Location within the United States Location within Oregon Location within Portland, Oregon
- Location: 213–215 NE Hancock Street; Portland, Oregon
- Coordinates: 45°32′12″N 122°39′48″W
- Built: 1956
- Architect: Benjamin Dean, Jack P. Stuhl
- Architectural style: Modern
- MPS: African American Resources in Portland, Oregon, from 1851 to 1973 MPS
- NRHP reference No.: 100007455
- Added to NRHP: February 23, 2022

Dean's Beauty Salon and Barber Shop is a historic business and commercial building located in the Eliot neighborhood of Portland, Oregon, United States. Organized in 1954 and purpose-built in 1956, it is one of the relatively few Black-owned businesses to survive the upheavals of urban renewal, disinvestment, and gentrification that decimated the Black business district in lower Albina starting in the 1960s. It represents the history of African American entrepreneurship in the Albina area and the importance of the hair care industry in African American culture, and became an important gathering place for the Black community. As of 2021, it is the oldest continuously operated Black-owned business in Oregon.

The building was entered on the National Register of Historic Places in 2022.

== See also ==
- National Register of Historic Places listings in Northeast Portland, Oregon
