= Vancouver Avenue First Baptist Church =

Historic building in Portland, Oregon, U.S.

- U.S. National Register of Historic Places
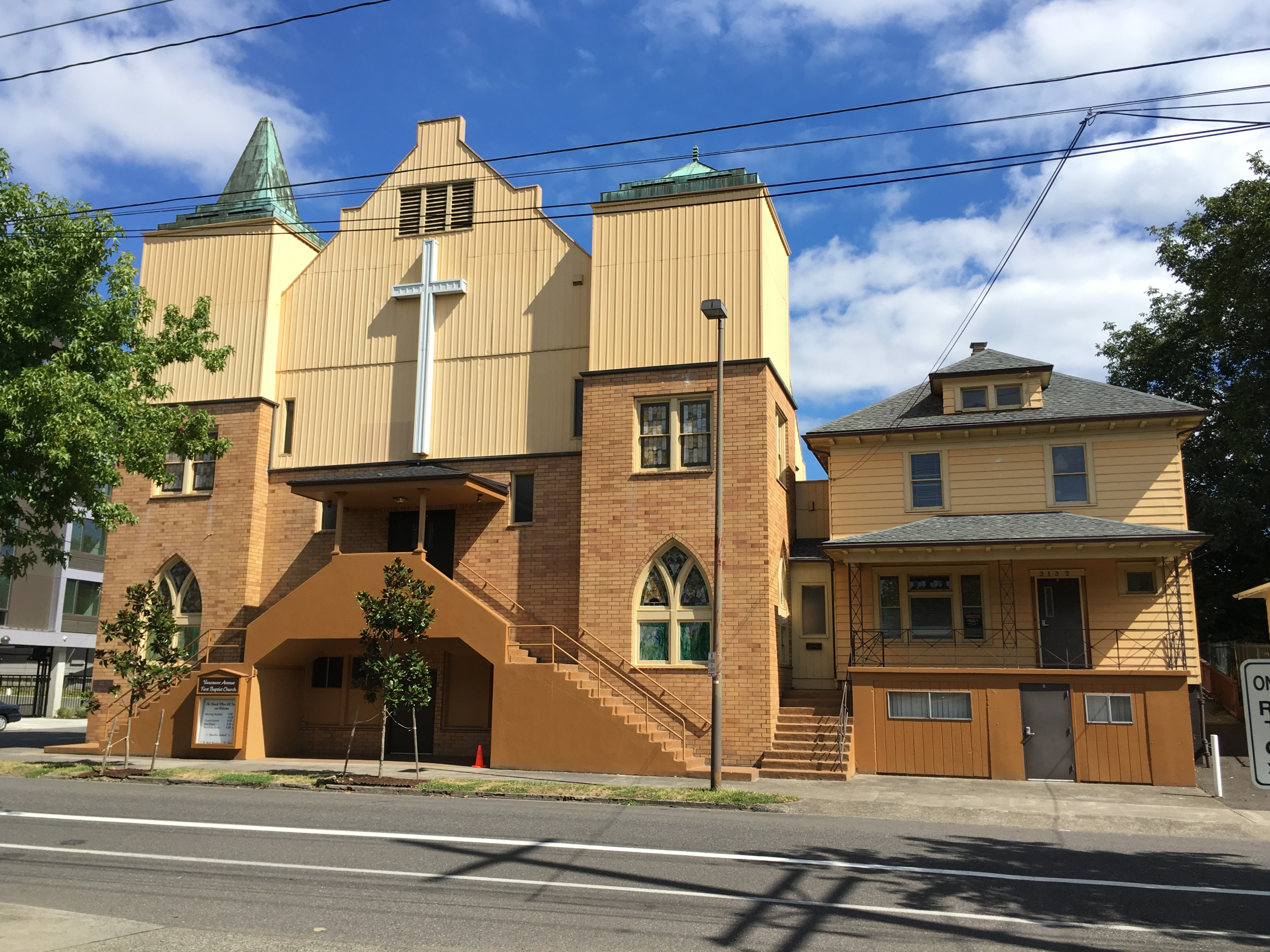
- The building's exterior in 2016

- Location within Portland, Oregon
- Location: 3138 North Vancouver Avenue, Portland, Oregon
- Coordinates: 45.54590°N 122.66766°W
- NRHP reference No.: 16000604
- Added to NRHP: September 6, 2016

The Vancouver Avenue First Baptist Church, located at 3138 North Vancouver Avenue in Portland, Oregon's Eliot neighborhood, was listed on the National Register of Historic Places in 2016.

== See also ==
- National Register of Historic Places listings in North Portland, Oregon
