= Simon Abraham Duplex =

Historic building in Portland, Oregon, U.S.

- U.S. National Register of Historic Places
- Portland Historic Landmark
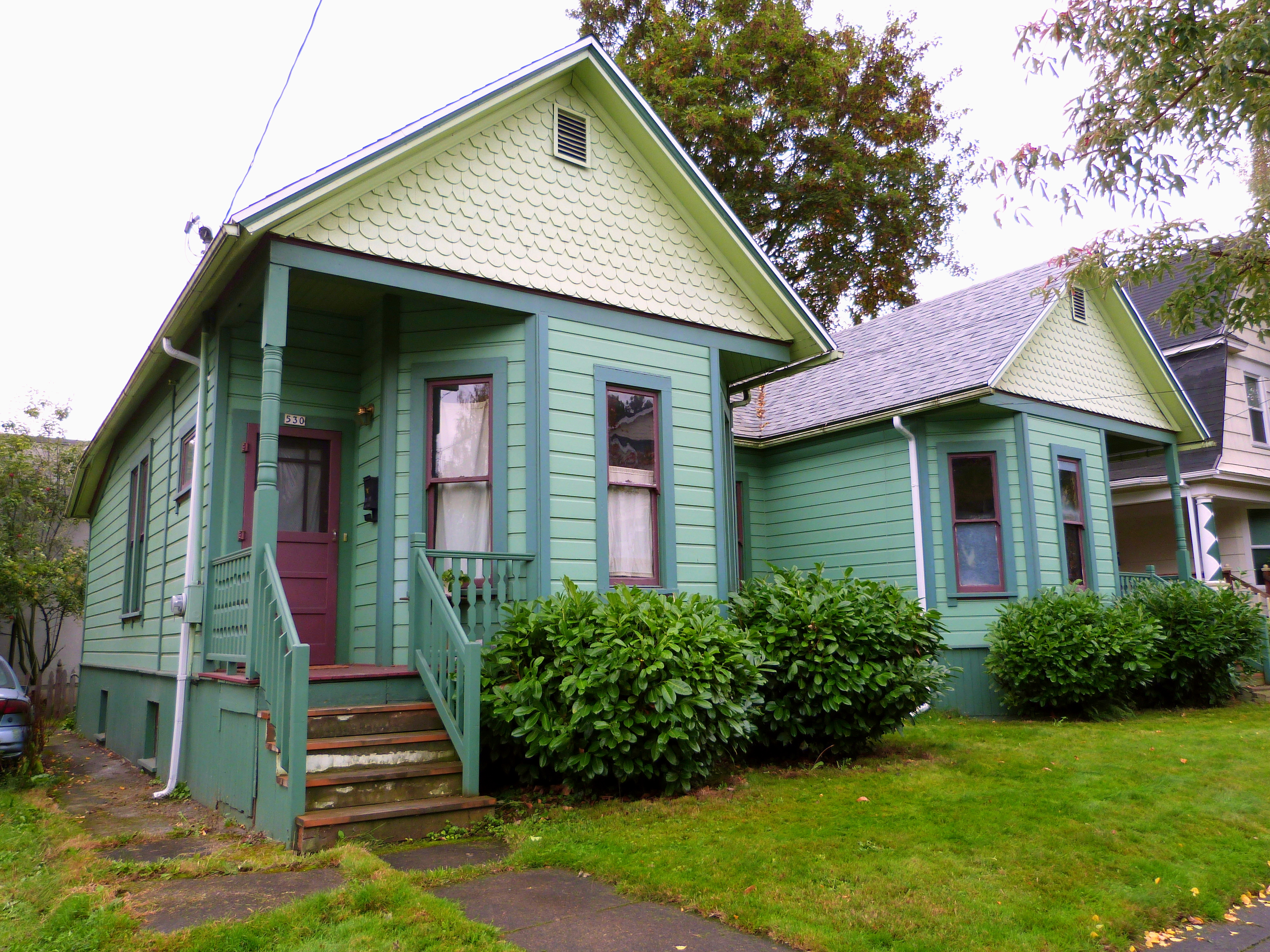
- The Simon Abraham Duplex in 2013

- Location within Portland, Oregon Location within Oregon Location within the United States
- Location: 522–530 NE San Rafael Street; Portland, Oregon
- Coordinates: 45°32′13″N 122°39′36″W
- Area: 0.09 acres (0.036 ha)
- Built: 1890
- Built by: Robert Gee
- Architectural style: Queen Anne
- MPS: Eliot Neighborhood MPS
- NRHP reference No.: 99000945
- Added to NRHP: August 5, 1999

The Simon Abraham Duplex is a historic house located in Portland, Oregon, United States. Built in 1890 in the Queen Anne style, it is one of few duplexes in the Eliot neighborhood remaining from the late-19th to early-20th centuries. Its early ownership by German Americans and Scandinavian Americans testifies to the settlement by ethnic immigrants in this part of the former city of Albina.

The duplex was listed on the National Register of Historic Places in 1999.

== See also ==
- National Register of Historic Places listings in Northeast Portland, Oregon
