= Sellwood Masonic Lodge =

Building in Portland, Oregon, U.S.

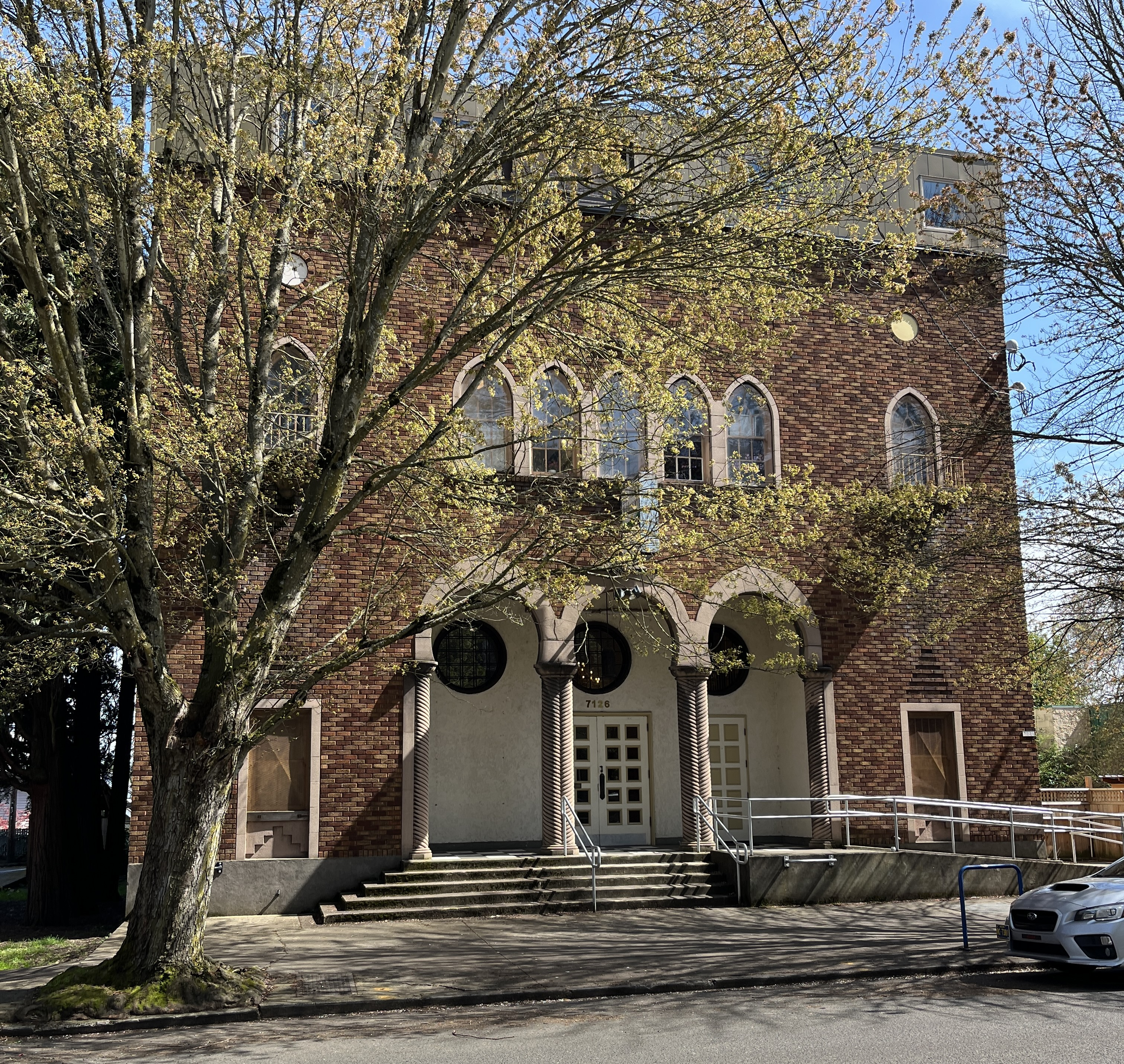
- The building's exterior, 2025

- Location within Portland, Oregon

General information
- Location: Portland, Oregon, United States
- Coordinates: 45.47262°N 122.6483°W
- Completed: 1930

Design and construction
- Architect: Francis Marion Stokes

The Sellwood Masonic Lodge is an historic building in Portland, Oregon's Sellwood neighborhood, in the United States.

== Design and history ==
Designed by Francis Marion Stokes, the building was put on the market with a $1.95 million asking price in 2008.

The Ancient Free and Accepted Masons, Sellwood Lodge #131 group of Masons was proposed in 1907 and formally organized in 1908.

The building is a three-story brick-faced structure built in 1930.

In 2018, the building at 7126 SE Milwaukie Avenue is home of the Little Village Montessori school.
