= Davis Block =

Historic building in Portland, Oregon, U.S.

- U.S. National Register of Historic Places
- Portland Historic Landmark
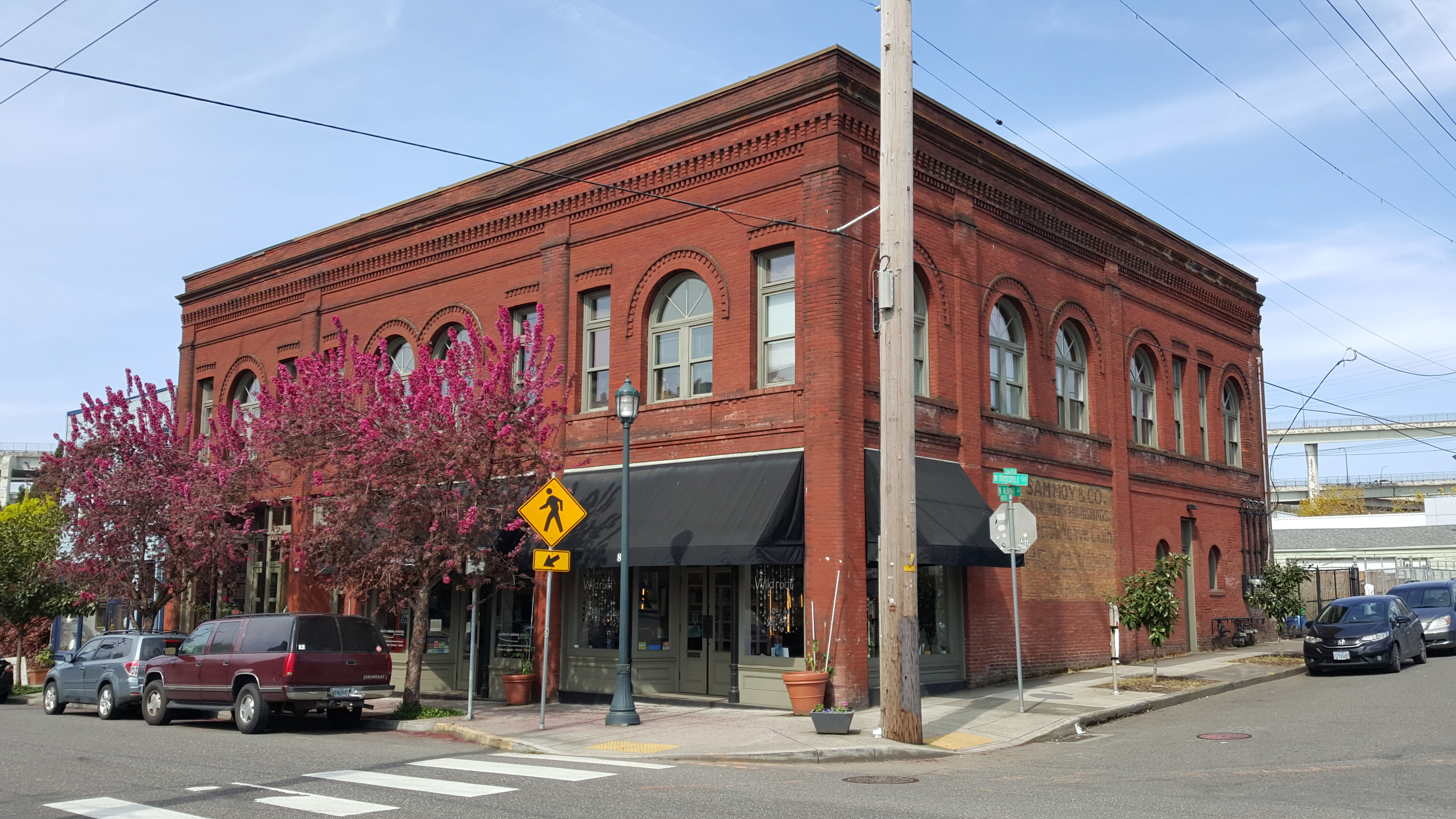
- The building's exterior in 2016

- Location within Portland, Oregon Location within Oregon Location within the United States
- Location: 801-813 N. Russell St., Portland, Oregon
- Coordinates: 45°32′28″N 122°40′29″W
- Area: 0.2 acres (0.081 ha)
- Built: 1890
- Architectural style: Romanesque
- MPS: Eliot Neighborhood MPS
- NRHP reference No.: 99000360
- Added to NRHP: March 18, 1999

The Davis Block, located in north Portland, Oregon, is listed on the National Register of Historic Places.

== See also ==
- National Register of Historic Places listings in North Portland, Oregon
