= Kenton Hotel =

Historic building in Portland, Oregon, U.S.

- U.S. National Register of Historic Places
- U.S. Historic district – Contributing property
- Portland Historic Landmark
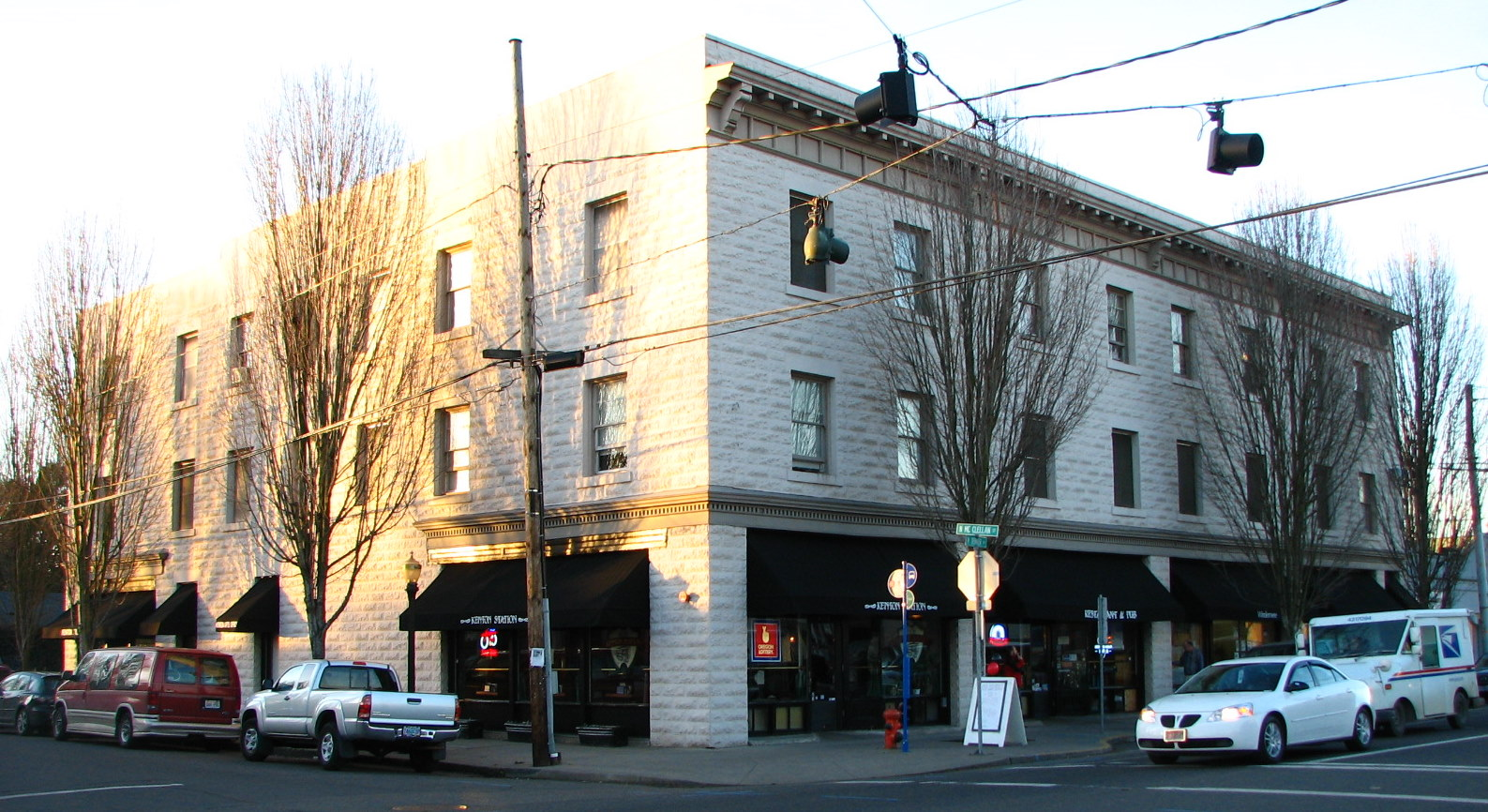
- The building's exterior in 2009

- Location within Portland, Oregon
- Location: 8303–8319 N. Denver Avenue, Portland, Oregon
- Coordinates: 45°35′00″N 122°41′14″W
- Area: 0.4 acres (0.16 ha)
- Built: 1909
- Architect: Dyer & Company
- Architectural style: Early Commercial
- Part of: Kenton Commercial Historic District (ID01000934)
- NRHP reference No.: 90001522
- Added to NRHP: October 16, 1990

The Kenton Hotel is a historic hotel in Portland, Oregon, United States. It was built in 1909, added to the National Register of Historic Places on October 16, 1990, and identified as a contributing resource in the Kenton Commercial Historic District when the district was added to the National Register on September 3, 2001.

== History ==
The building was first built by the Swift Meat Packing company in 1909. Since the building deteriorated from the 1970s to the 1980s, it was almost demolished in 1990. However, owing to its history, it was kept and added to the National Register of Historic Places.

== See also ==
- National Register of Historic Places listings in North Portland, Oregon
