= John Mock House =

Historic house in Portland, Oregon, U.S.

- U.S. National Register of Historic Places
- Portland Historic Landmark
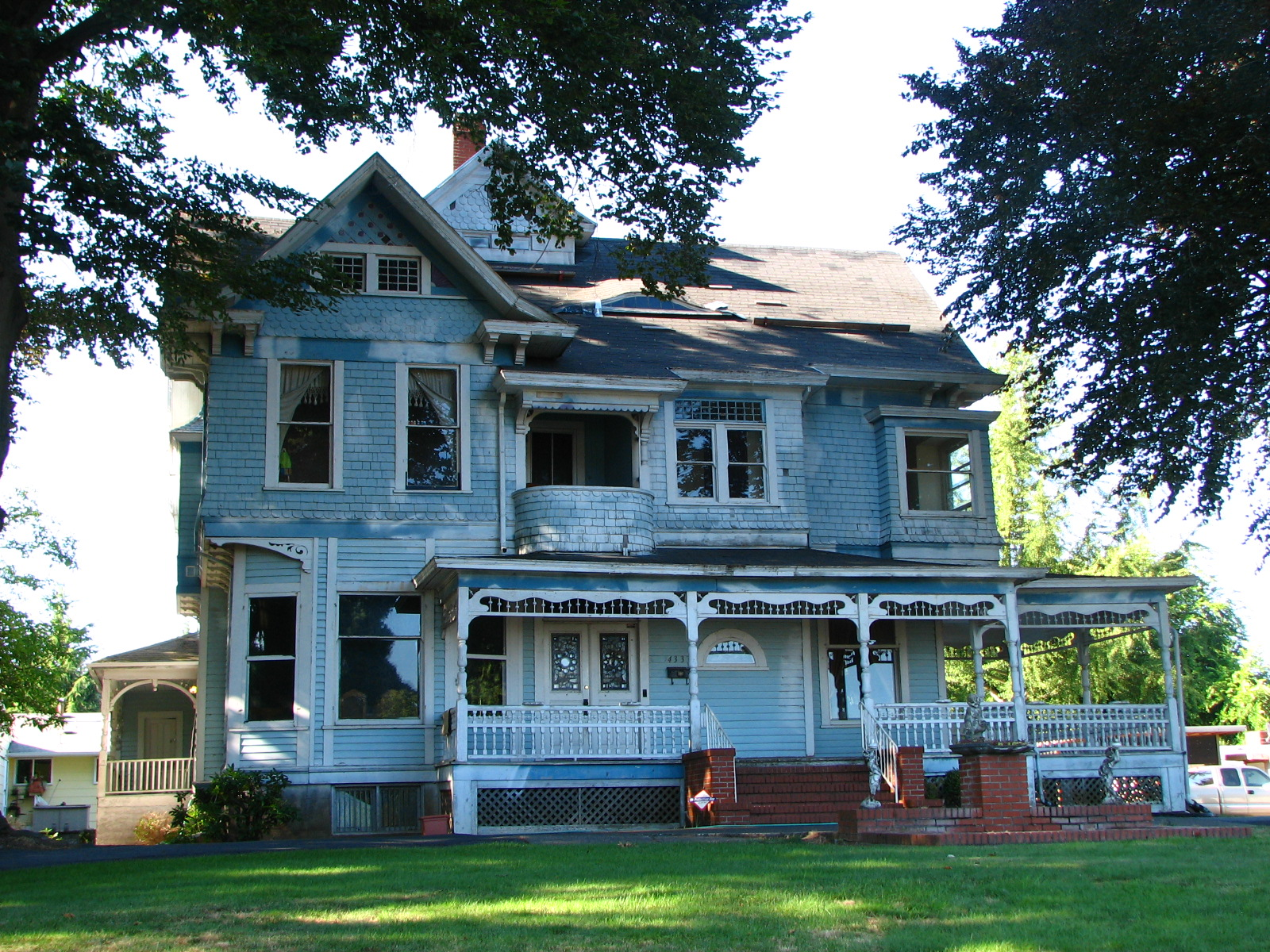
- The house's exterior in 2008

- Location within Portland, Oregon
- Location: 4333 N. Willamette Blvd., Portland, Oregon
- Coordinates: 45°34′32″N 122°42′43″W
- Area: 0.1 acres (0.040 ha)
- Built: 1894
- Architectural style: Queen Anne
- NRHP reference No.: 80003370
- Added to NRHP: February 15, 1980

The John Mock House is a house located in north Portland, Oregon, listed on the National Register of Historic Places. The Queen Anne style home constructed in 1894 was commissioned by John Mock, who owned much of the property in what is now the University Park neighborhood of Portland. The home was built as a replacement to Mock's original log cabin, which burnt in 1889. Mock died in the home at the age of 78. It sits next to Columbia Park Annex.

== See also ==
- National Register of Historic Places listings in North Portland, Oregon
