= Smithson and McKay Brothers Blocks =

Historic building in Portland, Oregon, U.S.

- U.S. National Register of Historic Places
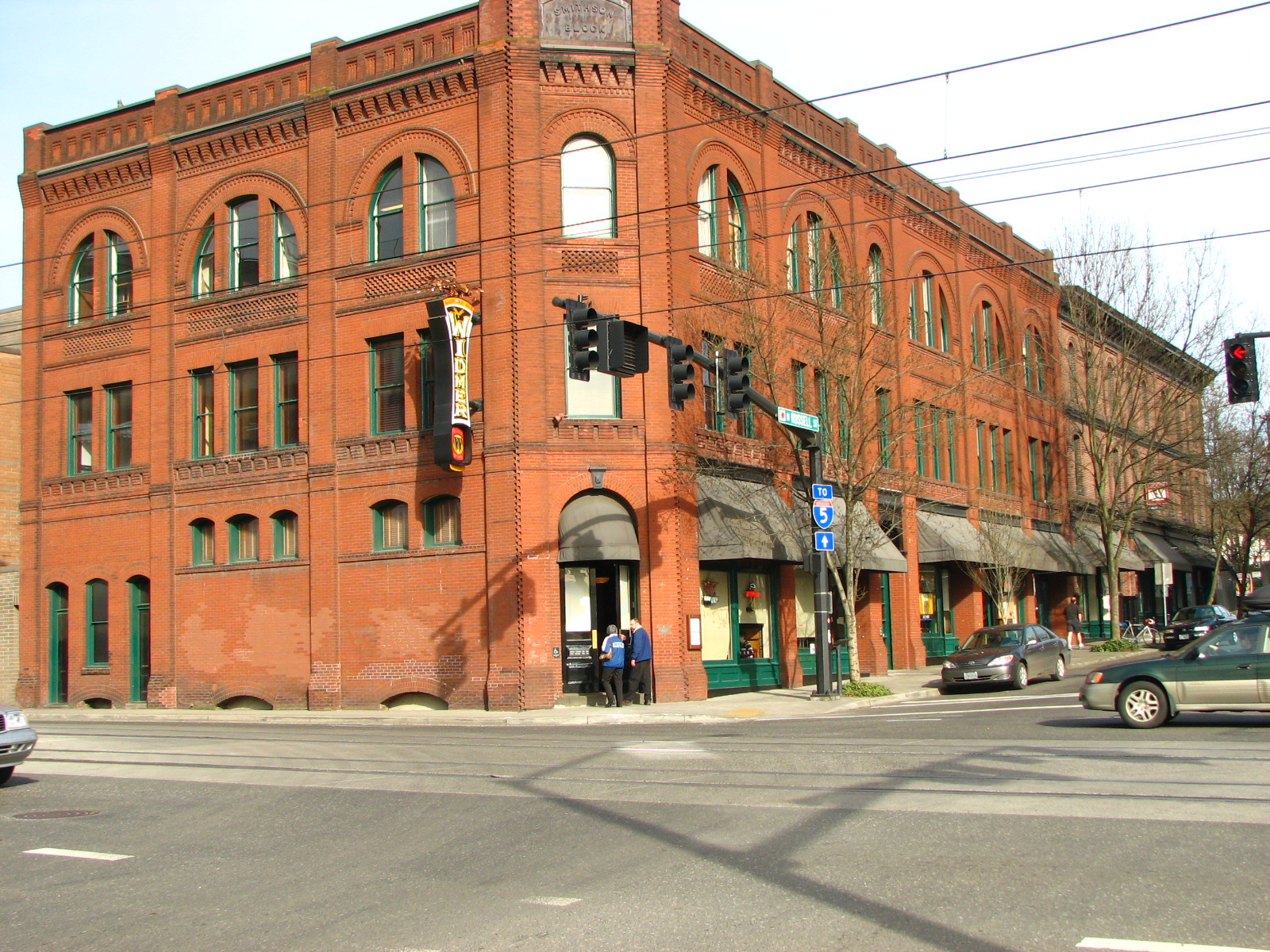
- The Smithson and McKay Brothers Blocks in 2008

- Location within Portland, Oregon
- Location: 943 and 927 N. Russell St., Portland, Oregon
- Coordinates: 45°32′29″N 122°40′32″W
- Area: 0.6 acres (0.24 ha)
- Built: 1890
- Architectural style: Italianate, Romanesque
- NRHP reference No.: 79002140
- Added to NRHP: August 10, 1979

The Smithson and McKay Brothers Blocks, located at 943 and 927 North Russell Street in Portland, Oregon, are included on the National Register of Historic Places.

== See also ==
- National Register of Historic Places listings in North Portland, Oregon
