= World Famous Kenton Club =

Bar and music venue in Portland, Oregon, U.S.

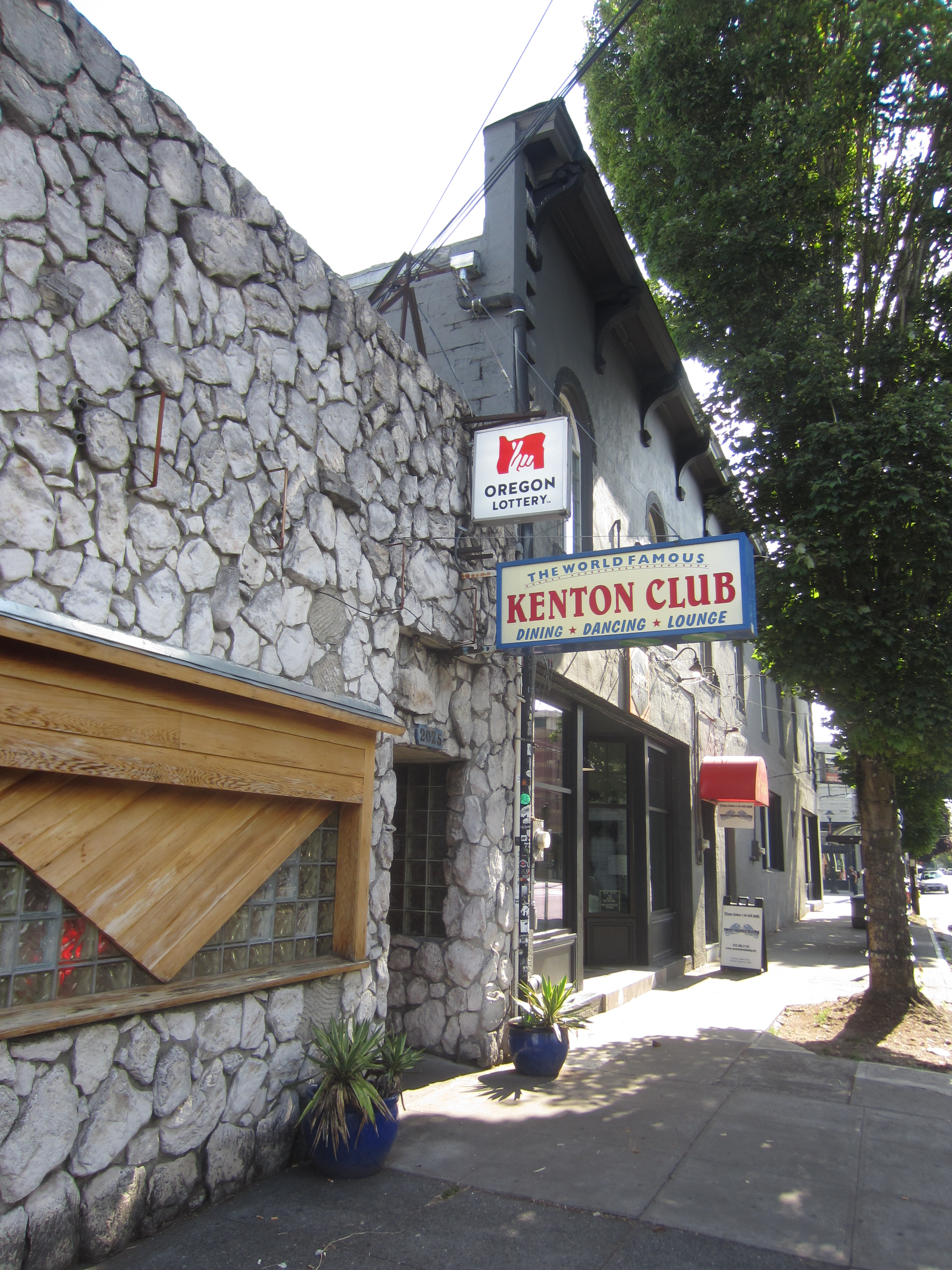
- The venue's exterior in 2019

- Location in Portland, Oregon
- Former names: Kenton Club
- Address: 2025 North Kilpatrick Street
- Location: Portland, Oregon, U.S.
- Coordinates: 45.582561°N 122.687537°W
- Owner: Daryl and Doreen Waitt

Construction
- Opened: 1947

Website
- kentonclub.com

The World Famous Kenton Club, or simply Kenton Club, is a bar and music venue in north Portland, Oregon, United States. The venue was established as the Kenton Club in 1947, and became a biker bar. The "world famous" tagline was acquired after appearing in the film Kansas City Bomber (1972); the venue became known as World Famous Kenton Club, and memorabilia related to the film and its star Raquel Welch are displayed throughout the interior.

== Description ==
The Kenton Club is located in north Portland's Kenton neighborhood. The music venue hosts disc jockeys, karaoke, and other live events in a variety of genres. Kenton Club's clientele has been described as "gray-haired", but has catered to late-night and younger audiences in recent years with the addition of live music and inexpensive beer options.

The interior has wood panelling, and in front of the stage is a large hardwood floor. There are low ceilings, Formica tables, linoleum, and vinyl-upholstered chairs, as of 2007. The venue's designated smoking area has been described as both "vast and intimate". Billiard tables, darts, pinball, trivia, and video poker machines are available for guests. In his 2016 overview of Portland's jukeboxes, The Portland Mercury's Santi Elijah Holley described the Kenton Club's jukebox selection as "packed with plenty of classic country, blues, and punk — Hank Williams Sr. alongside Hank III". The bar has happy hour each weekday, as of 2016.

In her 2013 walking guide of Portland, Becky Ohlsen described Kenton Club as "an excellent lowbrow hangout with a rocky facade, a wood-paneled interior, cheap drinks, live music, and a friendly, rowdy crowd".

== History ==
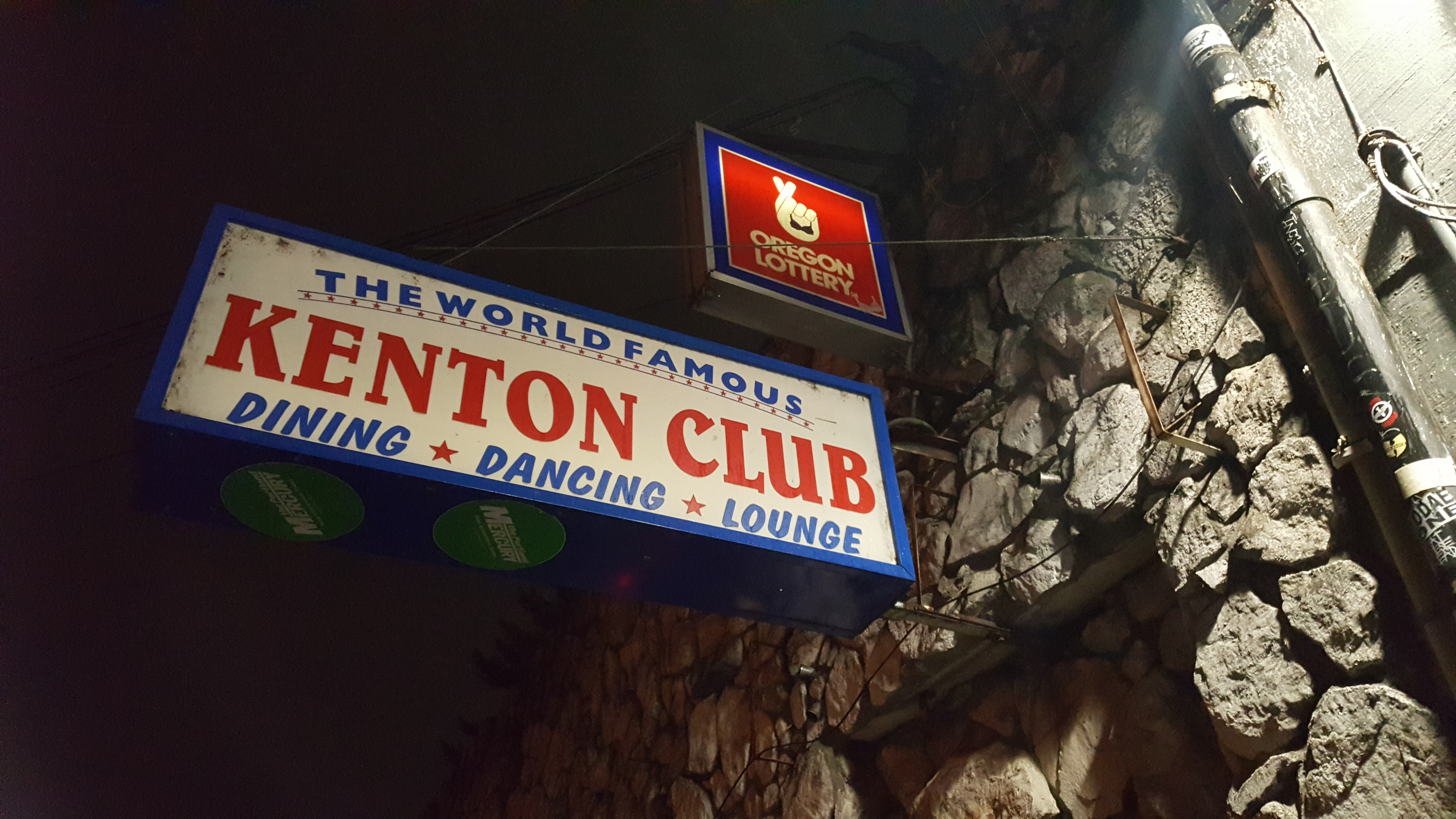
Exterior signage in 2018

The Kenton Club opened in 1947, and became a "honky-tonk and rumble-ready" biker bar shortly thereafter.

In 1972, the venue appeared in Kansas City Bomber, starring Raquel Welch. The Kenton Club adopted the "world famous" tagline, and became known as the World Famous Kenton Club as a "permanent memorial" to the film and Welch. Memorabilia related to Kansas City Bomber and Welch are displayed throughout the venue.

Daryl and Doreen Waitt purchased the business in 2006. Smoky Mountain BBQ began serving Southern cuisine for lunch and dinner inside the Kenton Club in 2008; the menu features brisket, collard greens, dirty rice, fried fish, hushpuppy, meatloaf, pulled pork, and ribs.

=== Events ===
The venue has hosted a variety of events and performers. DJ Action Slacks has been producing recurring vintage vinyl dance events at the Kenton Club since 2013 including Queer Country Junction, Club Nitty Gritty (rhythm and blues and soul music), Dance Craze, Touch Your Woman (Tribute to Ladies of Classic Country), and Flame: Vintage Vinyl Dance Party. "Twirl" caters to the queer community and features boogie, disco, funk, and house music, and "Vampyros Lesbos Dance Party" was a party that happened at some point, described as a "goth, post-punk, and industrial dance night for femmes and allies". In 2013, Kenton Club hosted Birdcloud and a queer country and honky-tonk dance party. The club was a featured stop on "Anticon", a competing event to SantaCon, in 2016. For New Year's Eve in 2018, the club hosted "Mutant Meltdown" featuring disco and new wave music. In 2019, the venue hosted the supergroup Wtfukushima, featuring members Fur Dixon and Dusty Watson. Kenton Club has also hosted the local music festivals "Booberamapaloozafest" and "MedEvil Madness".

== Reception ==
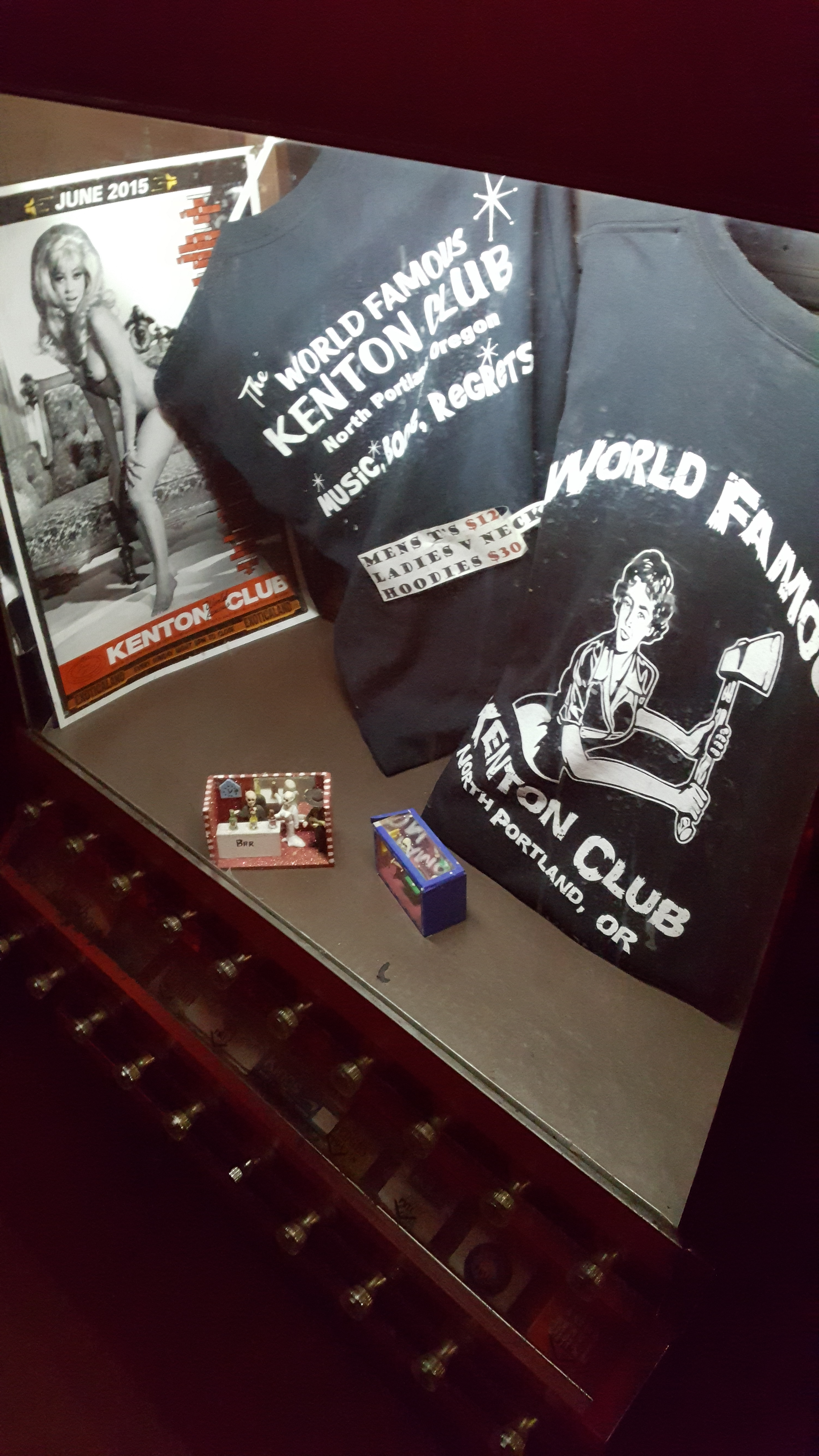
Memorabilia and merchandise displayed inside the venue, 2018

The Oregonian's Seth Lorinczi described Kenton Club as "lovably shabby" and said "its notoriety derives from weekend country and rockabilly acts". In his 2008 review of Smoky Mountain BBQ, Lorinczi quipped about the venue and its clientele, "Brave dim lighting and aged tipplers, or slink back to the cave with your kill." In her 2019 book Walking Portland, Becky Ohlsen said the Kenton Club has a "charming bravado". Barbara Mitchell of the Portland Tribune wrote in her 2007 review, "Drinks are stiff, cheap and simple for the most part – after all, this is a watering hole that pours its wine out of a box. If you're craving an artisan cocktail, you'd be in the Pearl District, not here." She said the bar has a "fantastic neighborhood feel" and "welcoming atmosphere", opining:

The World Famous Kenton Club does a fantastic job of maintaining a no-fuss honky-tonk vibe, and it's easy to imagine Willie Nelson and a passel of pals meeting up here for an afternoon beer, a late night hootenanny or a morning constitutional... Leave any pretensions you've been carrying on the sidewalk before you step into the dark and laid-back environs. The world has enough hipsters: The World Famous Kenton Club is an establishment whose coolness cannot be co-opted, and whose vibe-y atmosphere may have been immortalized but can't be duplicated.

Chris Sutton of The Portland Mercury described the Kenton Club as a "special kind of time machine taking you back to much simpler days—when there were fewer beer choices and hairy-chested macho men like Burt Reynolds were considered gods". He said the venue "straddles the line between public house amenity and dimly lit seediness so well", and its video poker machines "only [add] to the charm of a classic watering hole dripping with historic sentimentality".

The venue is ranked number 94 on Willamette Week's list of Portland's "100 best bars". Zach Middleton quipped, "Get here soon, or don't. Neither Raquel Welch nor the day patrons give a shit." In 2017, the newspaper's Matthew Korfhage called Kenton "one of Portland's last bars to still have hair on its chest and a swagger in its boots". He wrote, "The beer is cheap, the music's almost always free from Thursday to Sunday, and somebody's always spilled some beer. It used to be a bit more rough-and-ready in here, but even slightly cleaned up for the new karaoke-and-game-night crowds, it remains lovingly imperfect in every way that matters."

== Historic District ==
The ornamental concrete block building is located within the Kenton Commercial Historic District on the National Register of Historic Places. It was built in 1949 by the Kenton Building and Contracting Company and designed by Swift & Company. The building as constructed would have made it a Contributing Property to the historic district had its exterior not been significantly modified. Exterior tile work, removal of storefronts, and the covering of some windows have "damaged its historic integrity", causing it to be classified as "historic noncontributing".
