= Villa St. Rose =

Historic building in Portland, Oregon, U.S.

- U.S. National Register of Historic Places
- Portland Historic Landmark
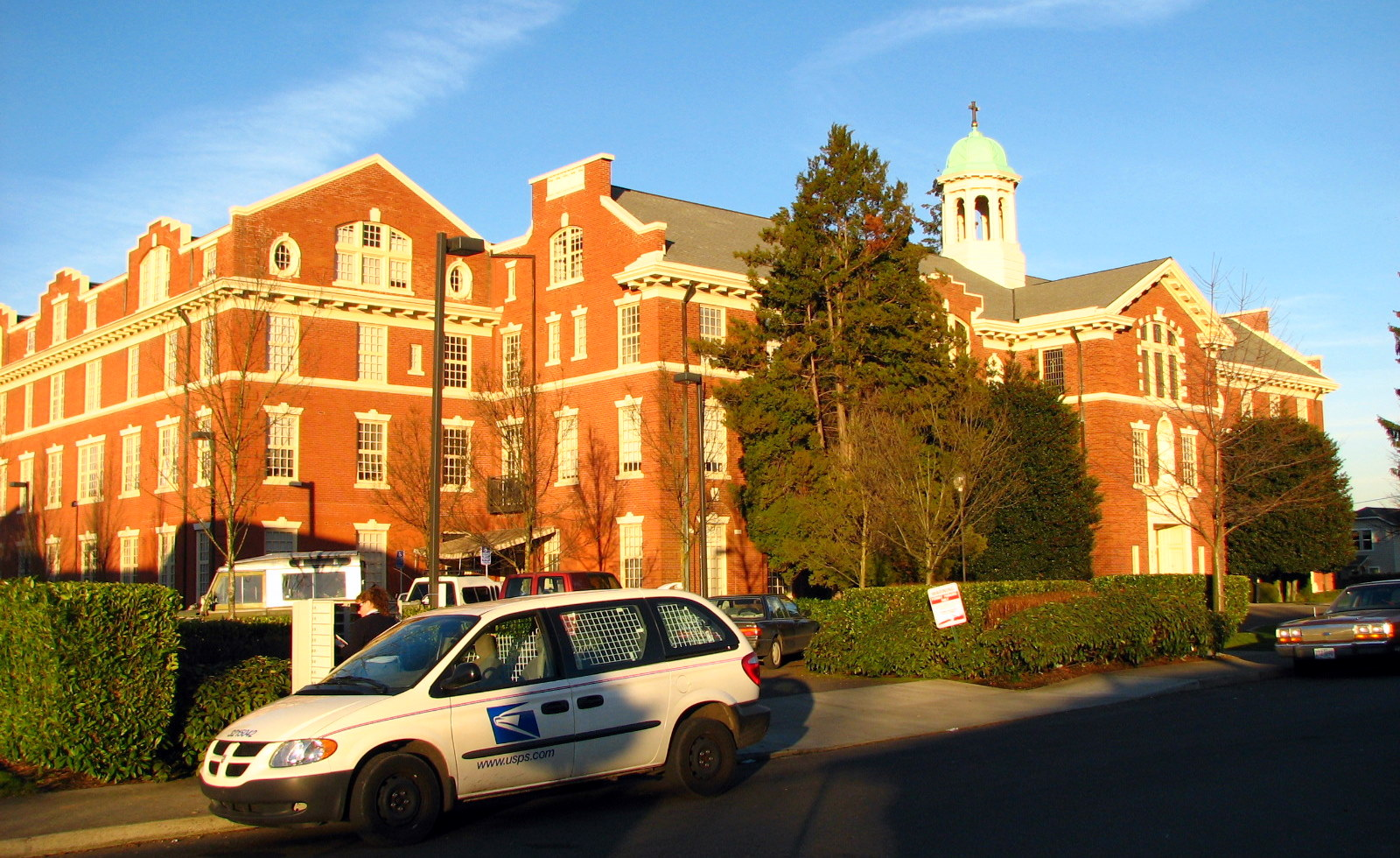
- Villa St. Rose in 2009

- Location within Portland, Oregon Location within Oregon Location within the United States
- Location: 597 N. Dekum St., Portland, Oregon
- Coordinates: 45°34′19″N 122°40′22″W
- Area: 2.4 acres (0.97 ha)
- Built: 1902
- Architect: Jacobberger, Joseph; Litherland & Abrey Co.
- Architectural style: Colonial Revival, Georgian
- NRHP reference No.: 00001427
- Added to NRHP: November 22, 2000

The Villa St. Rose is a former Catholic convent and girls' school located in north Portland, Oregon. It is listed on the National Register of Historic Places.

== History ==
The Villa St. Rose was established in 1902 by the Congregation of Our Lady of Charity of the Good Shepherd, founded by sister Rose Virginia Pelletier, a native of France. Pelletier received her holy habit and was officiated as Sister Mary of St. Euphasia in 1815 at the Convent of Refuge in Angers, France.

The Villa served as a boarding school for troubled adolescent girls, and in its early years had a peak of 200 students. By 1972, the Villa continued to serve in this manner, housing and rehabilitating girls from ages 12 to 21.

As of 2017, the Villa has been converted into Rosemont Court, which contains housing for 100 low-income elders and 18 families.

== See also ==
- National Register of Historic Places listings in North Portland, Oregon

== Sources ==
- Finkle, William H.; Hooper, Robert M.; Friedman, Barry A.; Jacobs, Donna L.; Peterson, Julia C. (June 7, 1972). Villa St. Rose Group Home Study (Thesis). Portland State University. doi:10.15760/etd.1625. Archived from the original on July 20, 2018.
