= Rinehart Building =

Historic building in Portland, Oregon, U.S.

- U.S. National Register of Historic Places
- Portland Historic Landmark
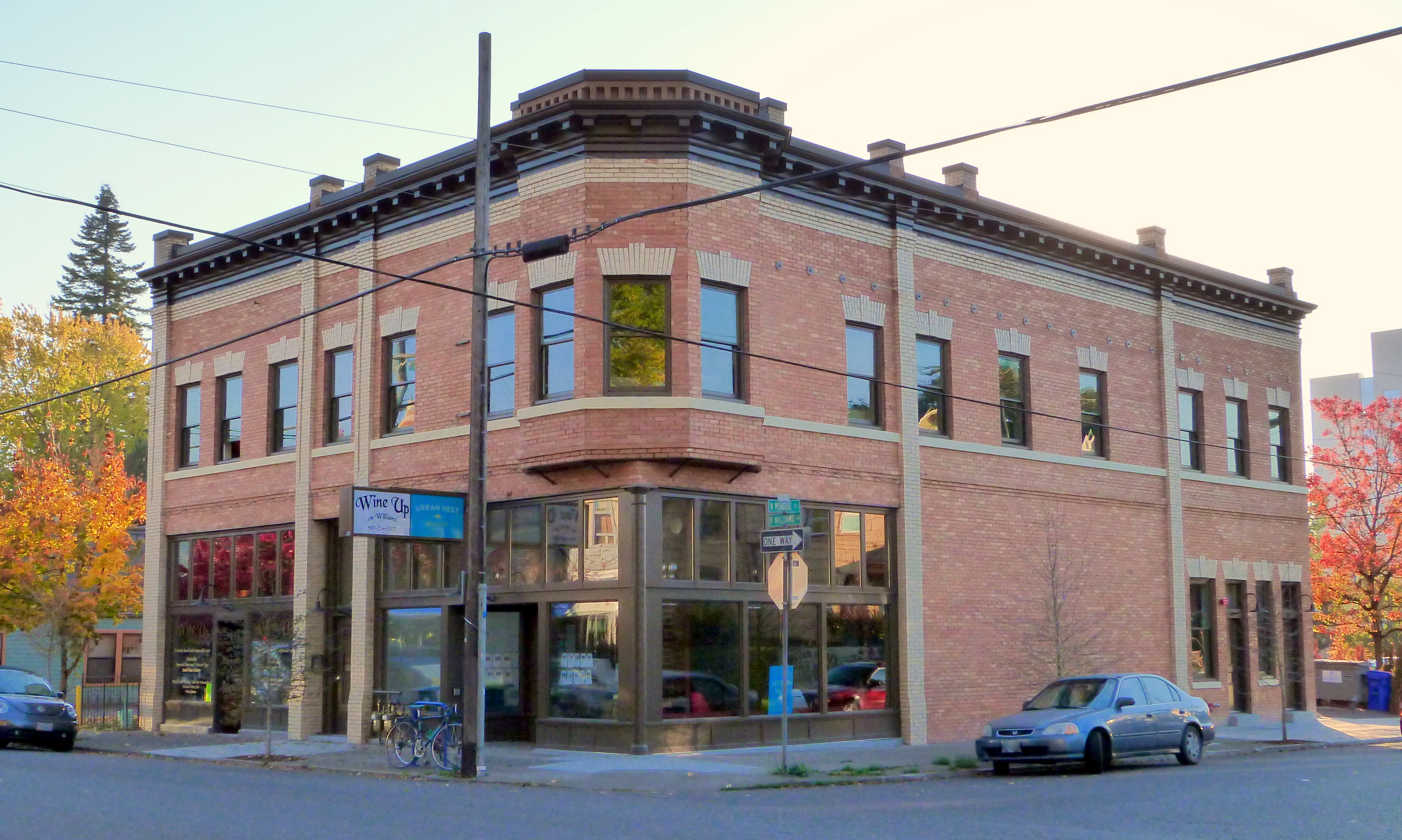
- The building's exterior in 2013

- Location within Portland, Oregon
- Location: 3037–3041 N. Williams Avenue; Portland, Oregon
- Coordinates: 45°32′43″N 122°40′01″W
- Built: 1910
- NRHP reference No.: 13000982
- Added to NRHP: December 24, 2013

The Rinehart Building, located in the Eliot neighborhood in north Portland, Oregon, is listed on the National Register of Historic Places. The two-story brick building was constructed in 1910 and is one of the last remaining structures from the historic Albina neighborhood.

== See also ==
- National Register of Historic Places listings in North Portland, Oregon
