= Elliott House (Portland, Oregon) =

Historic house in Portland, Oregon, U.S.

- U.S. National Register of Historic Places
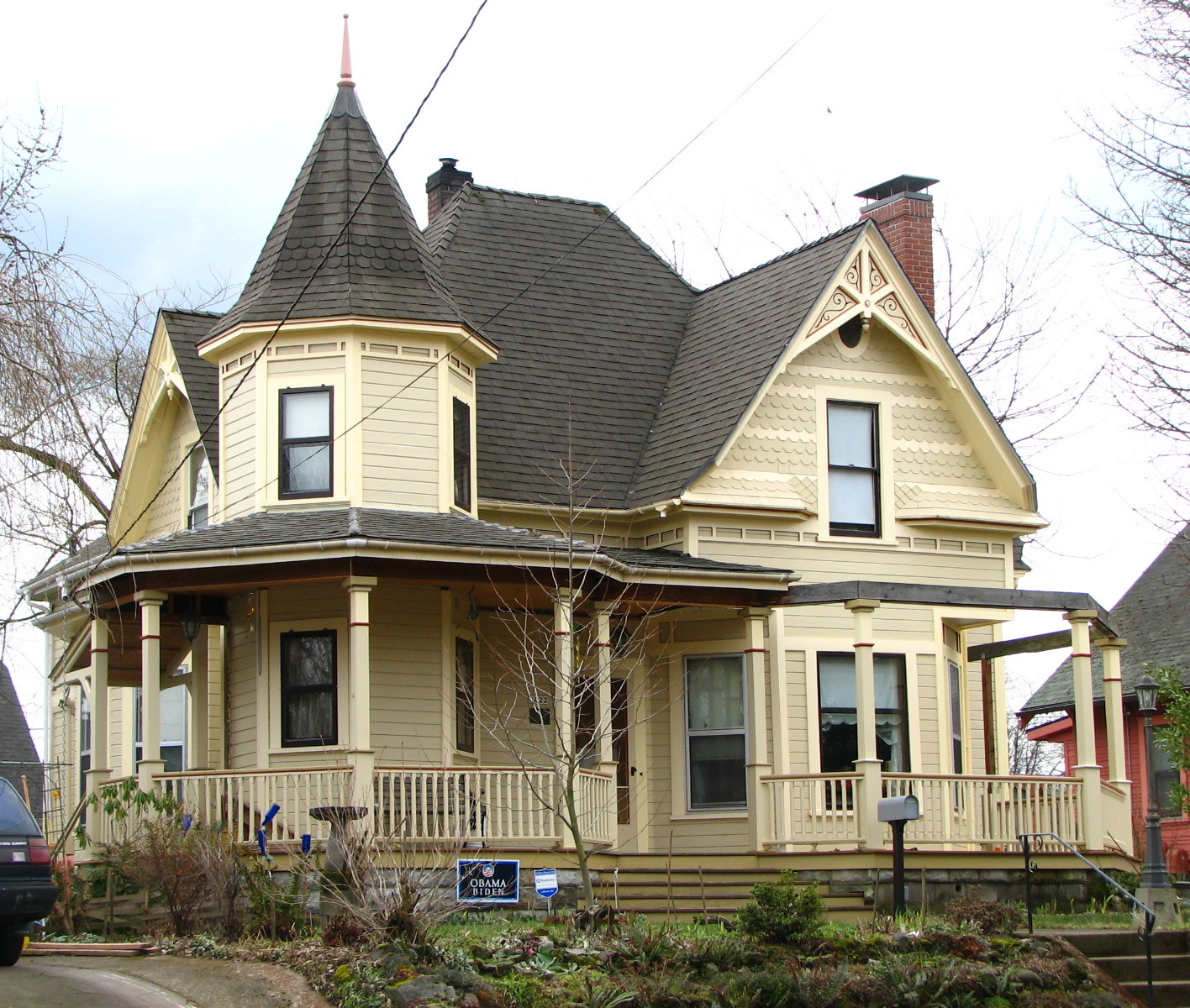
- Elliott House in 2009

- Location within Portland, Oregon
- Location: 2022 N. Willamette Blvd., Portland, Oregon
- Coordinates: 45°33′42″N 122°41′17″W
- Area: less than one acre
- Built: 1902
- Architect: William Cecil Elliott
- Architectural style: Queen Anne
- NRHP reference No.: 05001058
- Added to NRHP: September 21, 2005

The Elliott House is a house located in north Portland, Oregon listed on the National Register of Historic Places.

== See also ==
- National Register of Historic Places listings in North Portland, Oregon
