= Kenton Commercial Historic District =

Historic district in Portland, Oregon, U.S.

- U.S. National Register of Historic Places
- U.S. Historic district
- Location within Oregon
- Location: Portland, Oregon
- Coordinates: 45.5824°N 122.6869°W
- NRHP reference No.: 01000934
- Added to NRHP: September 3, 2001

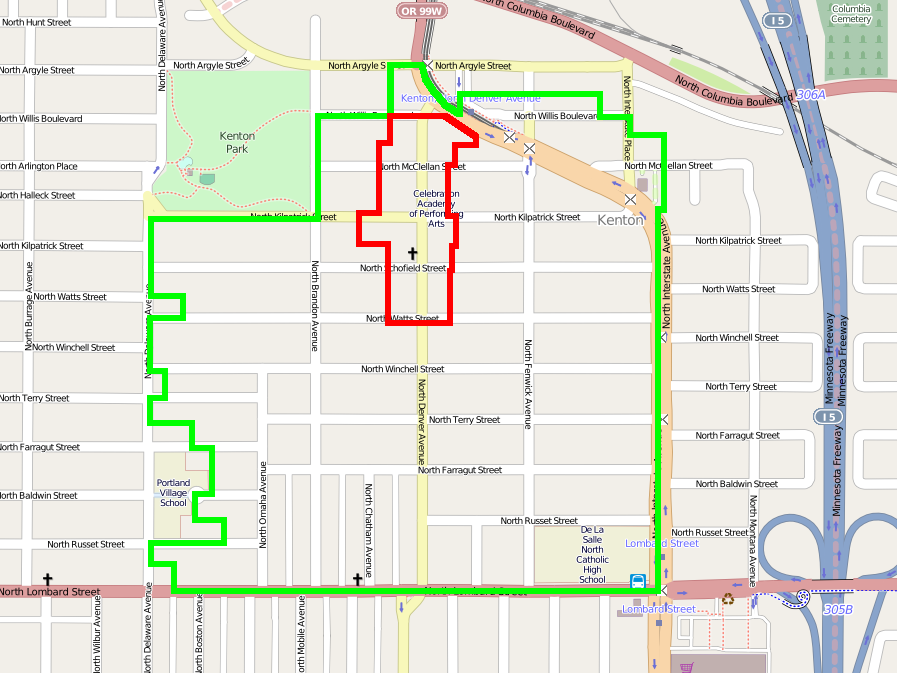
Map of the district

The Kenton Commercial Historic District is a historic district in north Portland, Oregon's Kenton neighborhood, in the United States. The district is listed on the National Register of Historic Places.

== Description ==
Kenton's principal commercial district is located on North Denver Avenue, extending roughly four blocks south from North Interstate Avenue, where the Paul Bunyan statue stands. The district was developed mainly between 1910 and 1949, and contains an unusually high concentration of buildings constructed using ornamental concrete blocks. The area developed directly as an outgrowth of Swift & Company's decision to run a streetcar line along the street from its stockyards to the rest of the Portland streetcar network. The district was listed on the National Register of Historic Places in 2001 for its role in the development of the neighborhood and the city.

== Properties ==
Contributing and noncontributing properties include:

- Bingham Building
- Cassady Building
- Chaldean Theater
- Coulter Building
- Dupey Building
- First National Bank of Portland Livestock Kenton Branch
- Goldstein Building
- Hobbs Building
- Johnson Building
- Kenton Bank Building
- Kenton Club
- Kenton Garage
- Kenton Hotel
- Kenton Lodge
- Kenyon Building
- Mackin and Son
- McArthur Hotel
- Rosin Building
- Smith Building
- Stafford & Frank Building
- Strocheker Building
- Sylvester Building

== See also ==
- National Register of Historic Places listings in North Portland, Oregon
