= Thomas M. and Alla M. Paterson House =

Historic house in Portland, Oregon, U.S.

- U.S. National Register of Historic Places
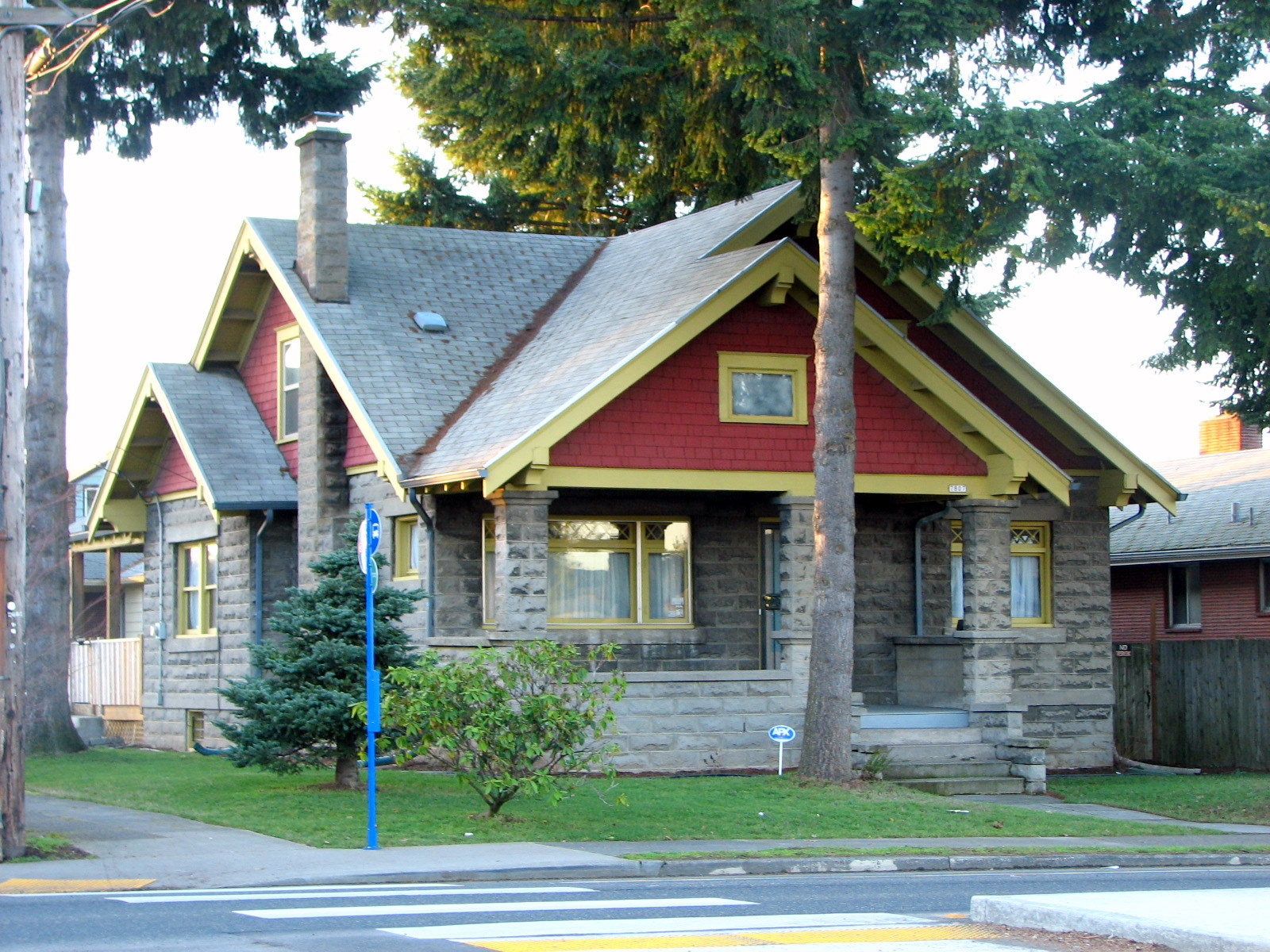
- The house in 2009

- Location within Portland, Oregon Location within Oregon Location within the United States
- Location: 7807 N. Denver Avenue, Portland, Oregon
- Coordinates: 45°35′1″N 122°41′9″W
- Area: less than one acre
- Built: 1909
- Architect: Dyer & Company
- Architectural style: Bungalow/craftsman
- NRHP reference No.: 98000202
- Added to NRHP: March 5, 1998

The Thomas M. and Alla M. Paterson House is a house located at 7807 North Denver Avenue in Portland, Oregon. It was listed on the National Register of Historic Places on March 5, 1998.

== See also ==
- National Register of Historic Places listings in North Portland, Oregon
