= Francis Marion Stokes Fourplex =

Historic building in Portland, Oregon, U.S.

- U.S. National Register of Historic Places
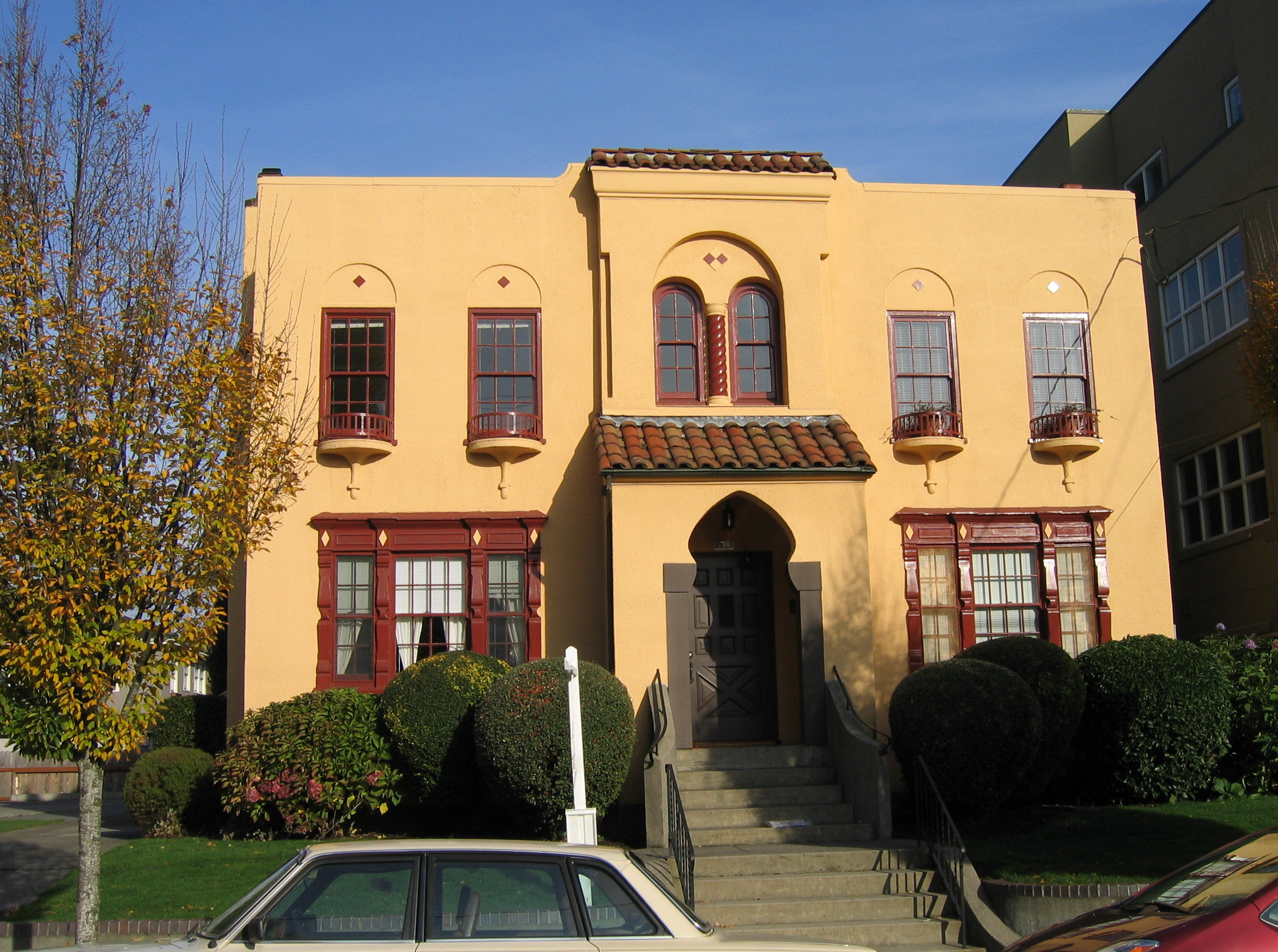
- Francis Marion Stokes Fourplex - South Elevation

- Location within Portland, Oregon
- Location: Portland, Oregon
- Coordinates: 45°31′58.2″N 122°41′52.4″W
- Built: 1926
- Architect: F. M. Stokes
- Architectural style: Mediterranean Revival
- NRHP reference No.: 96000121
- Added to NRHP: 22 February 1996

The Francis Marion Stokes Fourplex is a historic residential building located in the Northwest district of Portland, Oregon, United States.

== Architecture ==
The Fourplex is an example of Mediterranean Revival Style architecture. It is laid out on a rectangular plan with each floor divided into an east and a west apartment. The building is clad in smooth stucco typical of the Mediterranean style, and has a flat roof. The south elevation is symmetrical and features an enclosed entry porch having a pointed horseshoe arch in a Moorish style, decorated with wooden false beams.

Above the entry porch is a rectangular salient holding a pair of arched windows divided by a spiraled-column mullion. The windows are inset in a deep blind arch. Both the porch and the salient have tiled pent roofs. Flanking the entry porch are large tri-partate windows surrounded by highly decorated frames; above each of these is a pair of blind arches with decorative ceramic tiles inset in tympanums. Each arch has a double hung window, one over, and a corbelled wrought-iron balconet. The east and west sides of the building have stuccoed balconies at the first and second floor, chimneys servicing both levels, and flanking windows. The north elevation (rear) is fairly plain, except for an interesting arrangement of windows and a rear door.

== Building facts ==
The Francis Marion Stokes Fourplex is located at 2253 N.W. Pettygrove St, in the same block as historic Pettygrove House, a Victorian house built in 1892 and former home to Francis Pettygrove, the man who named Portland as a prize in a coin-toss.

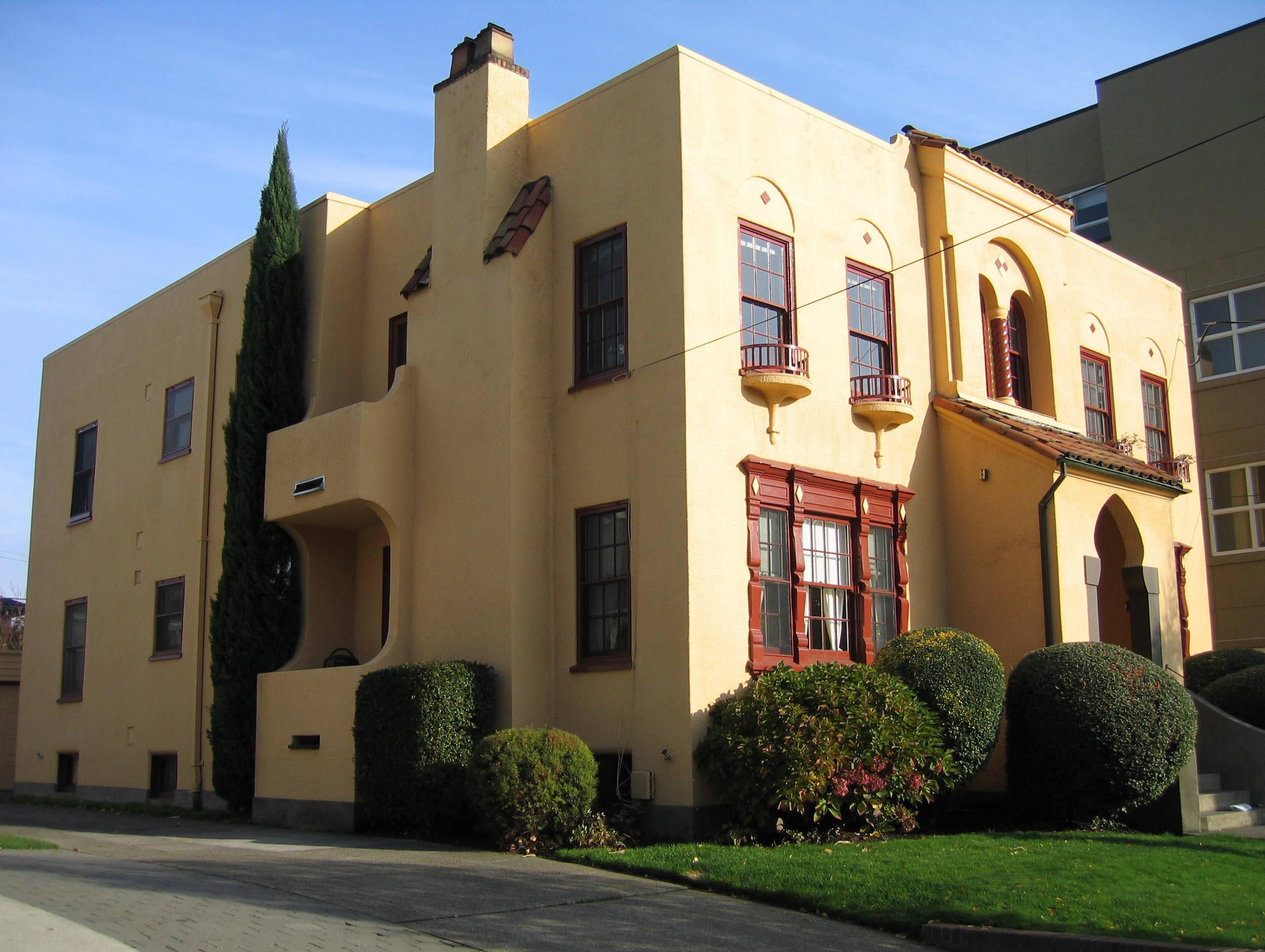
Southwest view

The Fourplex is located on a 6,000 square feet (560 m^{2}) lot. Each of the two floors has 1,964 square feet (182.5 m^{2}) of living space divided into two apartments per floor.

== The Architect ==
Francis Marion Stokes designed the building in 1926 for Esther Kuhn of Portland, Oregon. Stokes became owner of the building the same year and lived in it, in Unit #2, from 1929 until his death in 1975. Most of Stokes' work, which had a considerable influence on Portland's architecture, was completed during the 46 years that he lived in the Fourplex.

== National Register ==
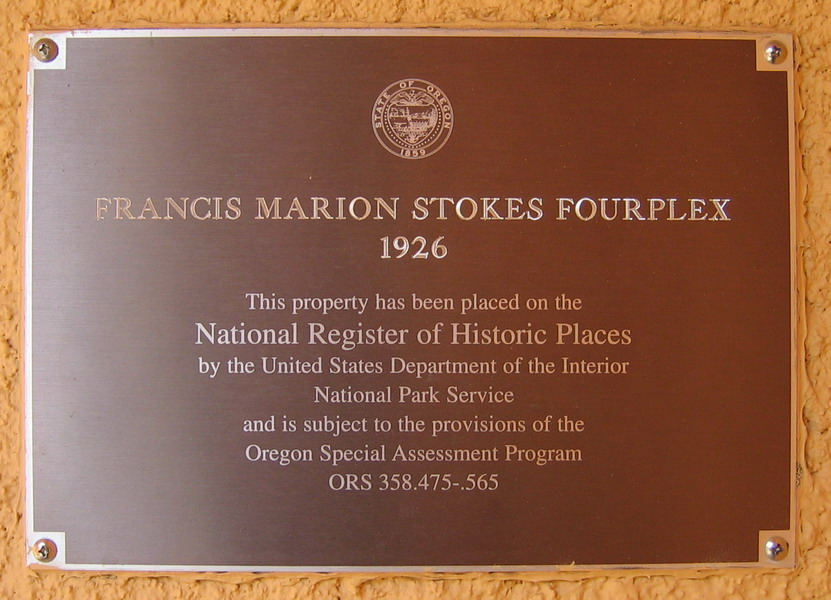
National Register of Historic Places plaque

The building was added to the National Register of Historic Places in February 1996. Prior to its listing on the Register, the Fourplex was also known as the Kuhn Apartments.

== See also ==
- The St. Johns Post Office (Portland, Oregon)
- Mission Revival Style architecture
- Architecture of Portland, Oregon
