= William Resor Stokes =

American architect and contractor

- Born: September 30, 1854; Cincinnati, Ohio, US
- Died: January 18, 1935 (aged 80); Portland, Oregon, US
- Children: 5

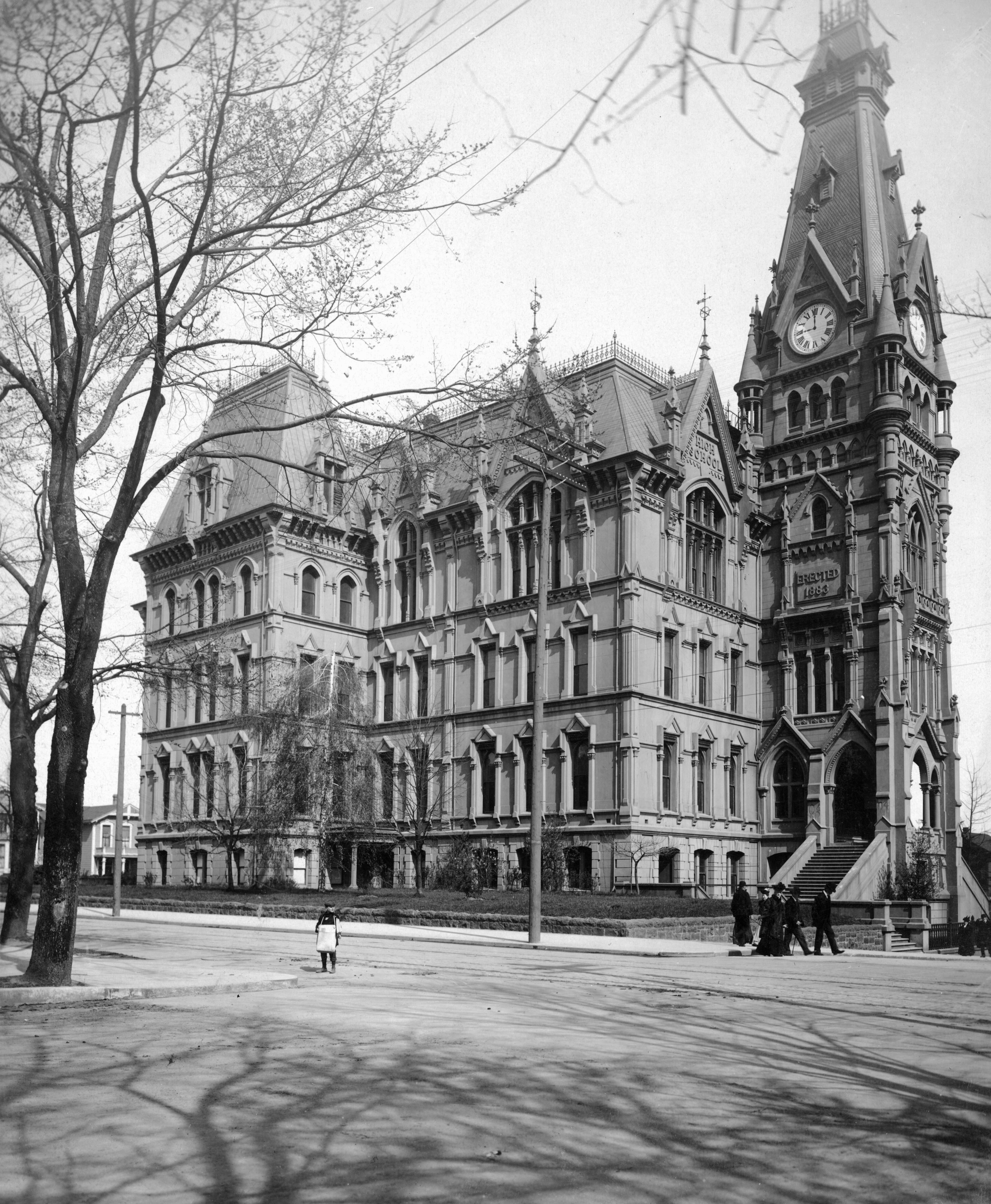
Portland High School

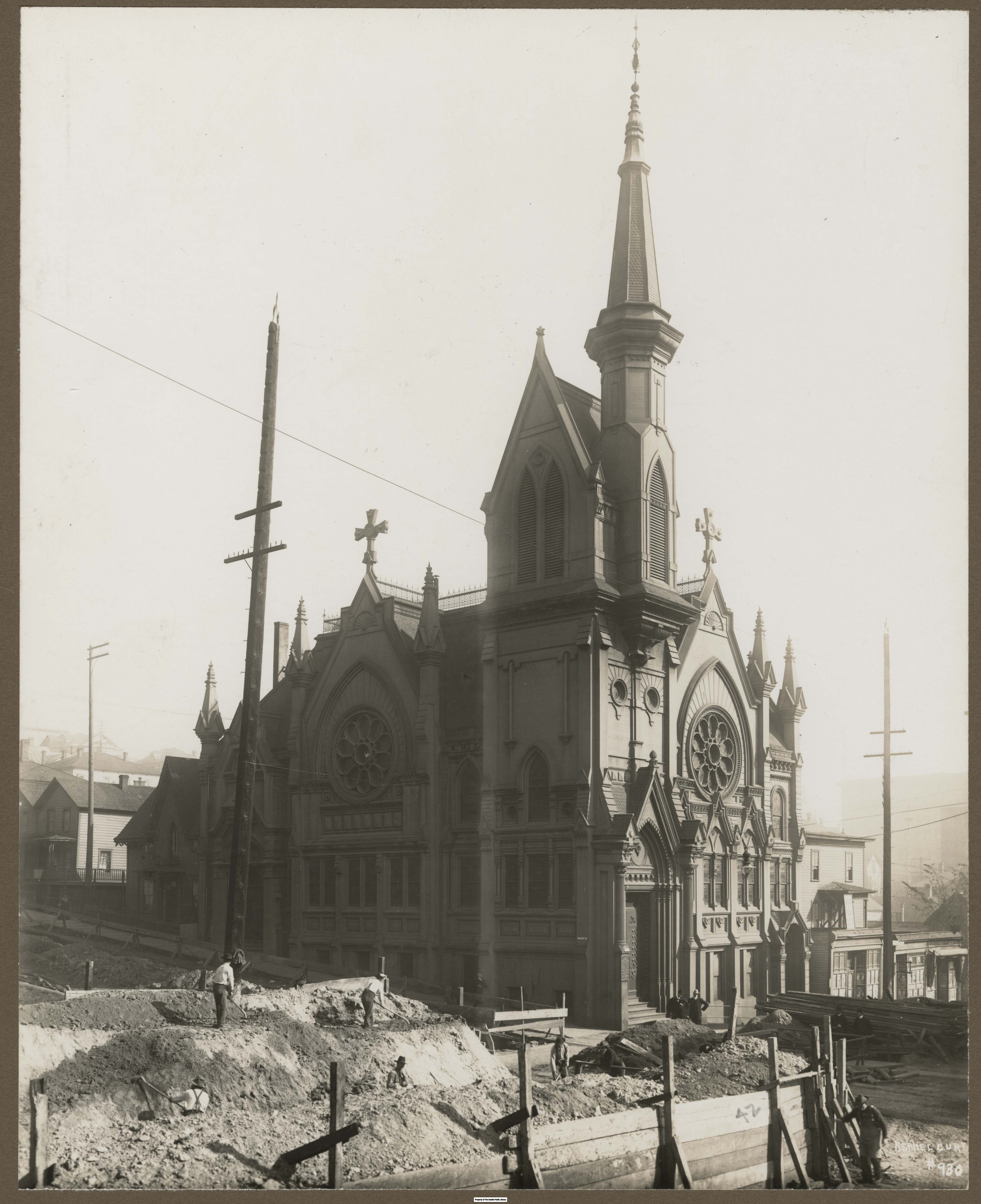
First Methodist Episcopal Church, Seattle

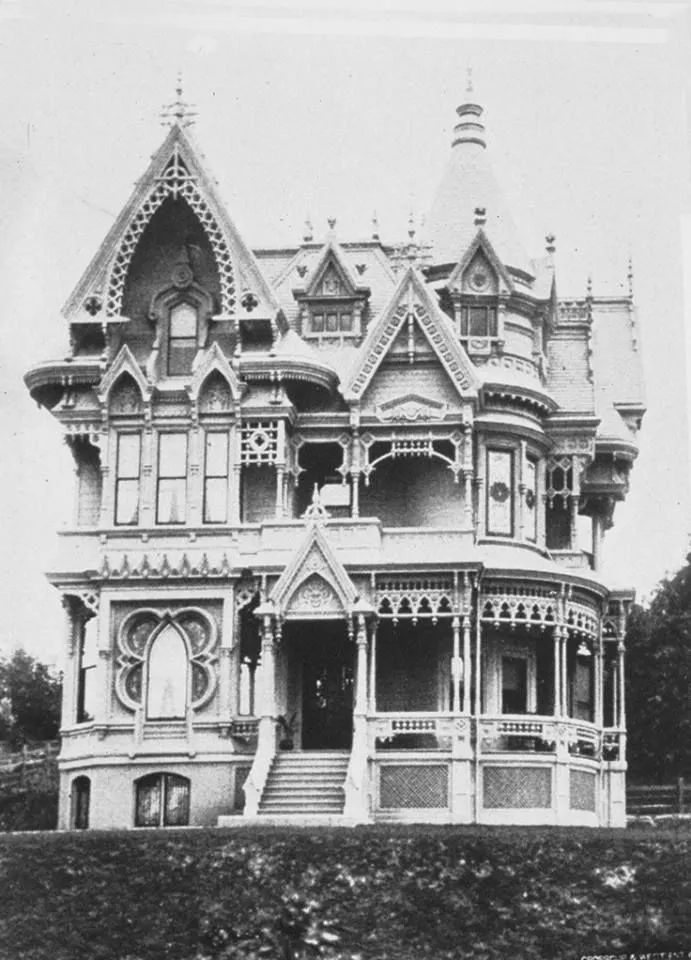
C.M. Forbes residence

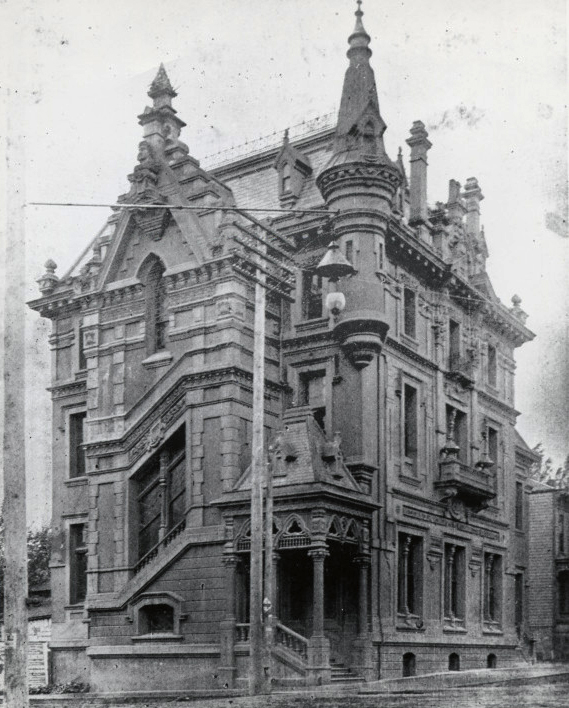
Medical College, Portland, 1886-87

William Resor Stokes (September 30, 1854 – January 18, 1935) was an American architect and contractor, who garnered significant recognition for designing residential and educational structures in the Portland, Oregon, area. His son, Francis Marion Stokes, later went on to continue making significant contributions to the architecture of the Portland Area.

== Career ==
William Stokes learned the profession from his father, who was a brick mason, and trained under John Ashar, a homebuilder in Cincinnati. In 1882, he boarded the transcontinental railroad to San Francisco, then sailed north to Portland where he made the majority of his career while working with Richard L. Zeller. During this time, he also occasionally designed projects to be executed by local architects elsewhere as evidenced by work executed in Seattle. He was especially known for his public school buildings constructed across the state of Oregon. His career continued until retirement in 1920.

=== Portland High School ===
Portland High school was "Transition or Semi-Norman" in style, and measured 200 feet deep by 140 feet wide, featuring a four-story atrium with a skylight. The architect was instructed that there was no money to be spent on ornaments which were non-essential to construction, and that beauty would instead have to be sought in lines of form framed in bricks and mortar. The building was initially projected to cost $40,000, final cost exceeding $123,385.85. The building required repairs within its first decade, and the roof around the skylight had begun to sag. Stokes responded that the School Board had been overzealous and that green lumber used in construction had suffered shrinkage. The Girls' Polytechnic School later used the building until 1928.

=== Forbes Residence ===
Sallie and Charles Forbes' house was commissioned in 1891 and completed in early 1892. It was constructed on high ground with an unobstructed silhouette. The style was described as "Modern English Gothic", and the interior featured Spanish mahogany and native cedar, while the foyer had a tile floor, mahogany double doors featuring art glass, and a "double-Newell mahogany staircase of unique design". The attic held a social hall, and an elevator ran from basement to attic. The house sold to Henry W. Goode in 1897, who sold it to Laura and Graham Glass in 1902. The Glass family lived in the house until 1929.

== Personal life ==
William was born in 1854 in Cincinnati to Edward and Mary Stokes. He married Mollie Lucinda Mathena Stokes in 1879, with which he had four sons, including William Roy Stokes (1880–1973) and Francis Marion Stokes (1883–1975), and one daughter.

== Known works ==
- C. M. Forbes Residence, Portland, 1892, (razed 1929)
- Goodnough Building, SW 5th & Yamhill, Portland
- Williams Avenue Schoolhouse, Albina, Portland, 1884, expanded 1889
- Ladd Residence, Laurelhurst
- Soldiers' Home, Roseburg
- Portland Central High School, 1883–1885 (razed 1928)
- Medical College, C & 14th St, Portland, 1886-87 (streets renamed Couch & 15th)
- 1st Methodist Episcopal Church, Seattle, 1887–1889 (razed 1907–1909)
- Frank C. Barnes House, 1913, Stokes & Zeller

== See also ==
- Architecture of Portland, Oregon
- Gothic Revival architecture
- Queen Anne architecture
- Francis Marion Stokes
