= St. Johns Post Office (Portland, Oregon) =

Historic building in Portland, Oregon, U.S.

- U.S. Post Office – St. Johns Station
- U.S. National Register of Historic Places
- Portland Historic Landmark
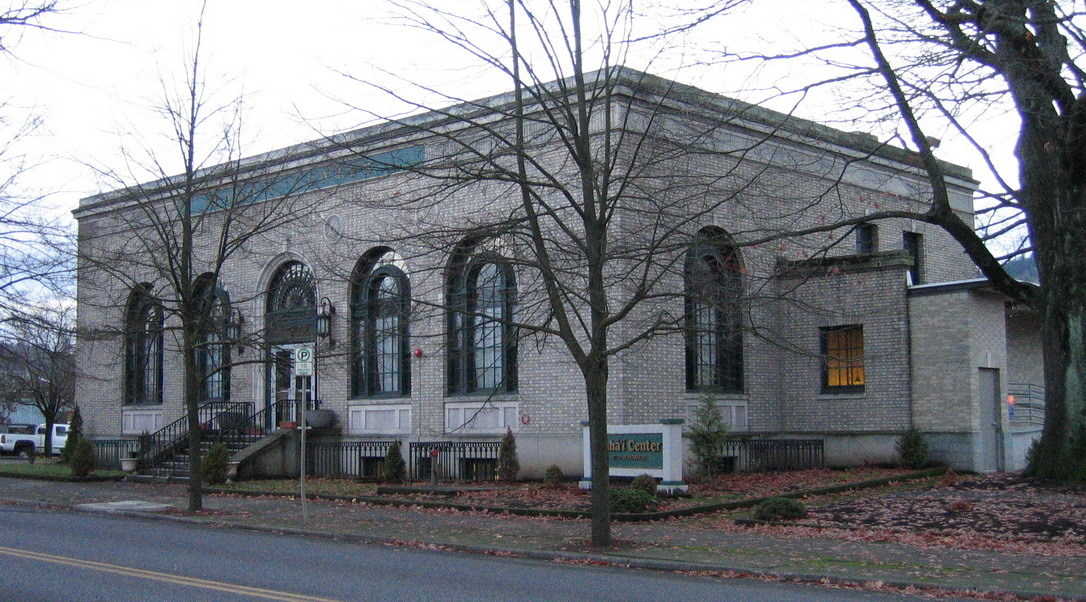
- The St. Johns Station in 2006

- Location within Portland, Oregon Location within Oregon Location within the United States
- Location: 8720 N. Ivanhoe Street; Portland, Oregon
- Coordinates: 45°35′25″N 122°45′24″W
- Area: 0.46 acres (0.19 ha)
- Built: 1933
- Architect: Francis Marion Stokes
- Architectural style: Georgian
- MPS: Significant US Post Offices in Oregon 1900–1941 TR
- NRHP reference No.: 85000543
- Added to NRHP: March 4, 1985

The St. Johns Post Office is a historic building located in the Cathedral Park neighborhood near St. Johns, Portland, Oregon, United States.

== History ==
The Post Office Department acquired the building site in 1931, and construction was completed in 1933. The building was entered on the National Register of Historic Places in 1985. It was purchased 1991 to become the Portland Baháʼí Center.

== Architecture ==
The St. Johns Post Office is an example of a small community post office constructed in the 20th Century Georgian style (also Colonial Revival-style) typical of Depression Era federal architecture. The building exhibits classical symmetry and proportion, yet is a transitional building in that it lacks the archaeological detail of classically inspired federal architecture of the Beaux-Arts tradition. The building's Georgian style is suggested in the detailing of the arched Palladian windows and termination of the facade with a molded frieze and cornice.

The building is also unique among small Oregon post offices in that it was designed by a local architect, Francis Marion Stokes, who designed several architecturally prominent buildings in the Portland area, several of which are included in the city's historic resource inventory.

== Art ==
The building's lobby features two murals with both a local and state significance. They are titled "Development of St. Johns" and were completed in 1936 by John Ballator under the auspices of the Treasury Department's Section of Painting and Sculpture. The murals depict the development of the neighborhood with significant historical events and prominent citizens. Ballator was an artist from Topeka who was born in Portland in 1909. He attended the University of Oregon and the Yale School of Fine Arts.

== See also ==
- Francis Marion Stokes Fourplex
- Architecture in Portland, Oregon
- National Register of Historic Places listings in North Portland, Oregon
