= Charles Crook House =

Historic house in Portland, Oregon, U.S.

- U.S. National Register of Historic Places
- Portland Historic Landmark
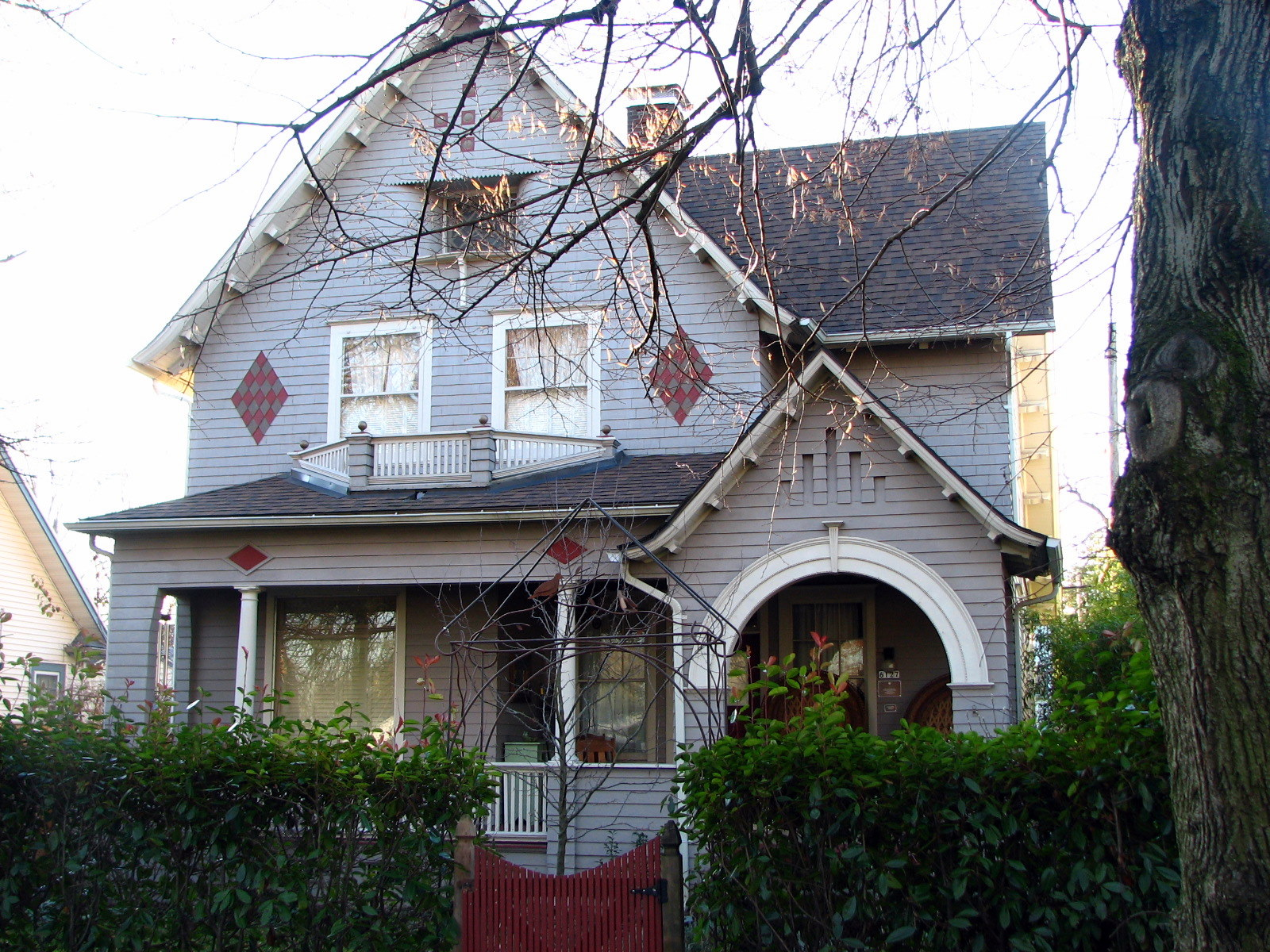
- Charles Crook House in 2009

- Location within Portland, Oregon
- Location: 6127 N Williams Ave, Portland, Oregon
- Coordinates: 45°34′02″N 122°40′02″W
- Built: 1894
- Architect: William M. Whidden
- Architectural style: Queen Anne
- NRHP reference No.: 97000130
- Added to NRHP: February 21, 1997

The Charles Crook House is a house located in north Portland, Oregon, that is listed on the National Register of Historic Places.

== See also ==
- National Register of Historic Places listings in North Portland, Oregon
