= Kay Stearns Bruening =

American nutritionist and academic administrator

- Education: St. Lawrence University; Syracuse University; New York University
- Scientific career
- Fields: Medical nutrition therapy, dietetics education
- Workplaces: Syracuse University
- Doctoral advisor: Judith Gilbride

Kay Stearns Bruening is an American nutritionist and academic administrator serving as the associate dean of academic affairs at the Syracuse University David B. Falk College of Sport and Human Dynamics since 2023. She was previously an associate professor specializing in medical nutrition therapy and dietetics education.

== Life ==
Bruening completed a B.S. in biology from St. Lawrence University. She earned a M.S. in nutrition at the Syracuse University. She completed a Ph.D. in clinical nutrition at New York University School of Education. Her 1998 dissertation was titled The Child and Adult Care Food Program: Dietary intake and three health outcomes in young urban children attending day care. Judith Gilbride was her doctoral advisor.

Bruening is a nutritionist specializing in medical nutrition therapy and dietetics education. She researches adult malnutrition and the development of food-based programs for adult weight management and related comorbidities. She was an associate professor and the undergraduate director of the department of nutrition and food studies at the David B. Falk College of Sport and Human Dynamics, Syracuse University. She also served as its director of the Nutrition Assessment, Consultation, and Education Center. As a part of their 2013 to 2014 class, Bruening was inducted as a fellow of the Academy of Nutrition and Dietetics. On August 1, 2023, she succeeded Eileen Lantier as the Falk College associate dean of academic affairs. She oversees the program review, curriculum development, and accreditation of academic programs.
