= Francis Marion Stokes =

American architect (1883–1975)

- Born: August 4, 1883; Cincinnati, Ohio
- Died: June 2, 1975 (aged 91); Los Angeles, California

Francis Marion Stokes (August 4, 1883 – June 2, 1975) was an American architect famous for his works in the Portland, Oregon, area. Francis and his father, William R. Stokes, formed two generations of a Portland design and architectural tradition lasting for over 80 years, from 1882 though the 1960s. The combined design work of the Stokes family had a major impact on the architecture of Portland.

== The William Resor Stokes legacy ==
The work of Francis Marion Stokes continued, and expanded, that of his father William R. Stokes, who arrived in Portland in 1882. In 1883, William joined Richard Zeller in creating the firm of Stokes and Zeller, working as both architects and builders. For forty years, the firm designed churches, schools, hospitals, fraternal buildings and commercial structures with special attention to residences and apartment buildings. William Stokes worked until 1920, concentrating on buildings on the east side of Portland.

== Career ==
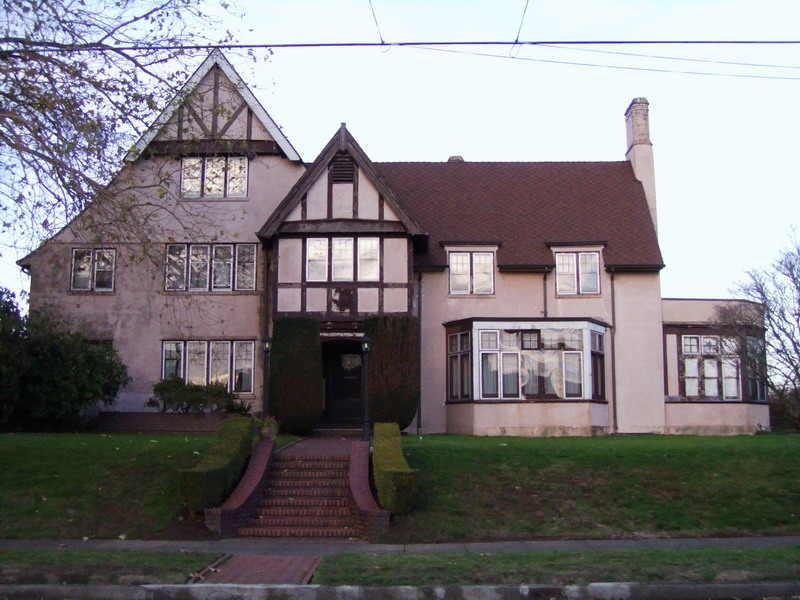
Residence Tudor at 2737 NE Alameda

Francis Marion Stokes was trained in architecture at the Oregon Agricultural College in Corvallis. His training continued under his father's direction during the years he spent as a clerk and architect for Stokes and Zeller. By 1916, Francis was president of Stokes and Zeller, a position he held until 1937. He enlarged the geographical scope of the firm, designing buildings throughout Portland. His designs were more cosmopolitan than those of his father, and used many building styles for over 270 buildings completed during a career that spanned five decades. Most of his work was completed during the 46 years he lived in the Francis Marion Stokes Fourplex, at the time known as the Kuhn Apartments building.

== Works ==
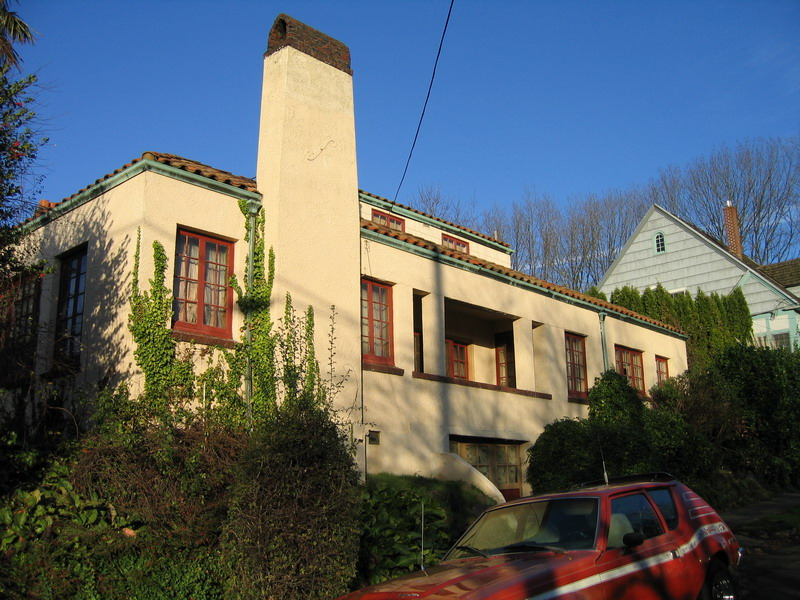
Dr. F.H. Dammasch Home at 1834 SE 22nd Ave

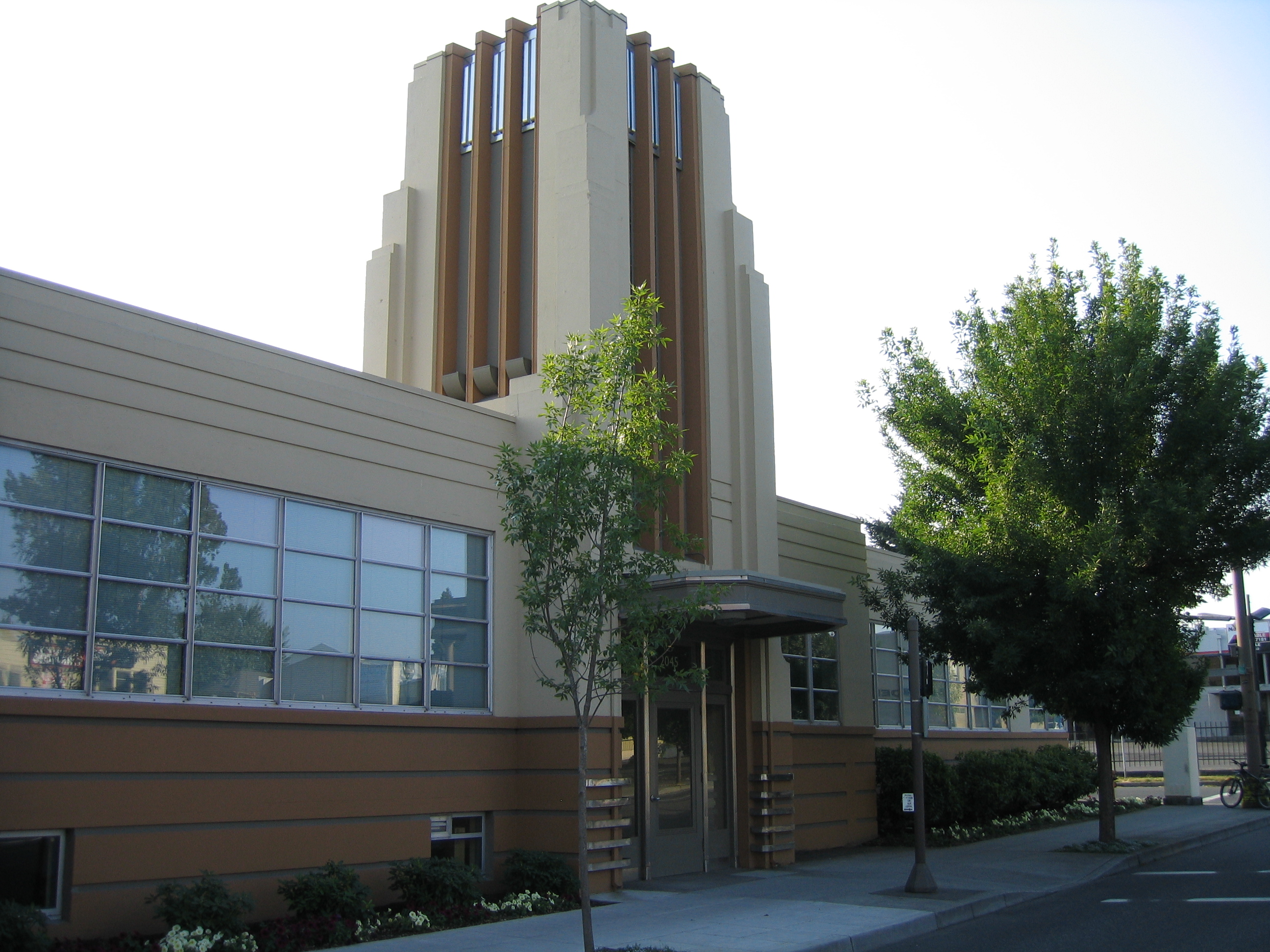
Williams & Company building at 2045 NE M.L.K. Blvd (formerly NE Union Ave)

Many of Francis Marion Stokes' buildings are listed on the City of Portland Historic Resource Inventory.

They include the Williams & Company Building, 2045 NE M.L.K. Blvd (1936), the F.H. Dammasch Home (1926) at 1834 SE 22nd Avenue, the Sellwood Masonic Lodge at 7126 SE Milwaukie (1930), and the Residence Tudor (1923) at 2737 NE Alameda. At least two of his buildings are on the National Register of Historic Places: the St. Johns Post Office, a Georgian-style building constructed at 8720 N Ivanhoe in 1932, and the Francis Marion Stokes Fourplex, which was also his home from 1929 until his death in 1975 at age 91.

== See also ==
- Architecture of Portland, Oregon
- William Resor Stokes
