= Henry C. and Wilhemina Bruening House =

Historic house in Portland, Oregon, U.S.

- U.S. National Register of Historic Places
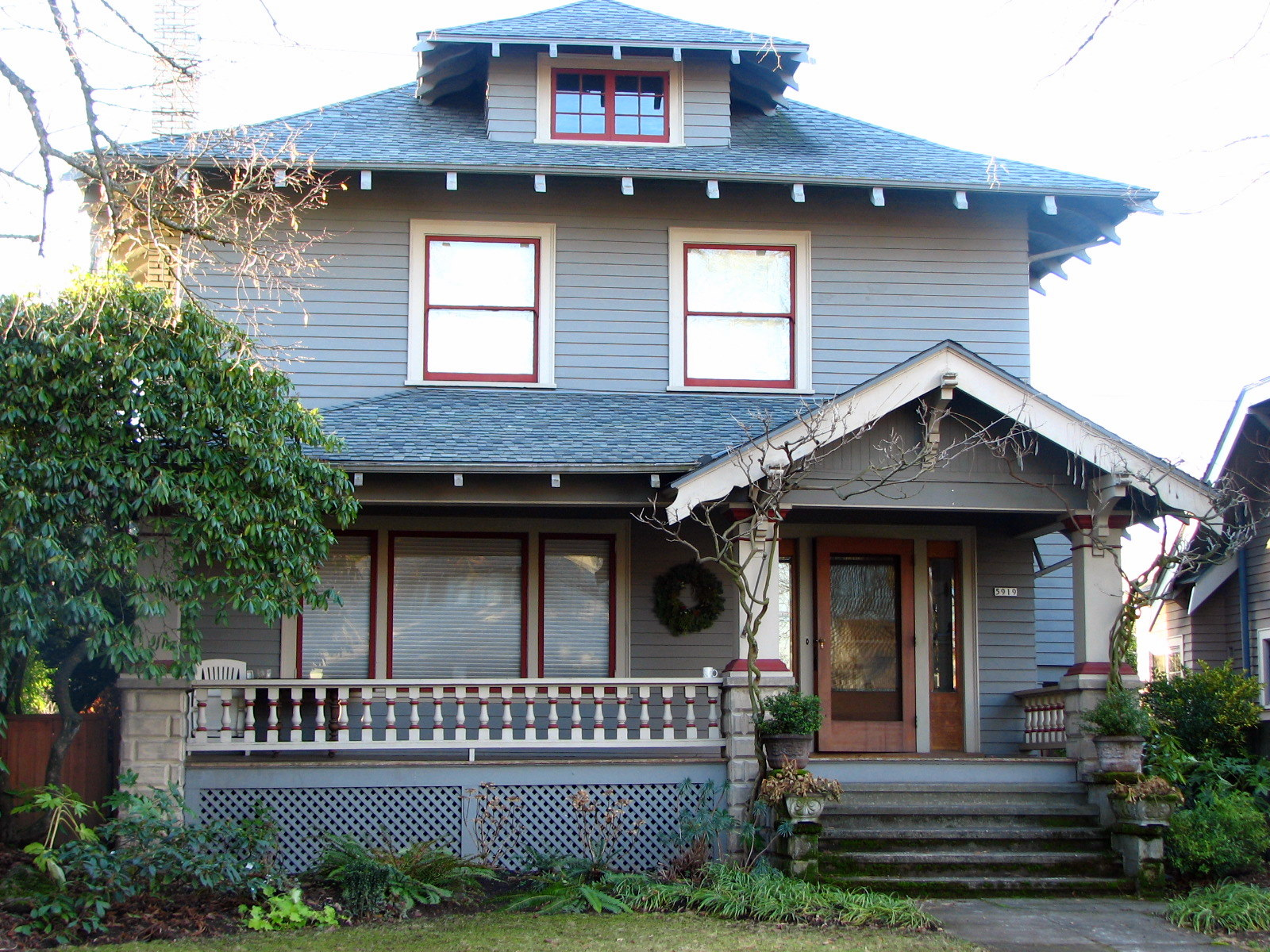
- Henry C. and Wilhemina Bruening House in 2009

- Location within Portland, Oregon
- Location: 5919 N. Williams Avenue; Portland, Oregon
- Coordinates: 45°33′58″N 122°40′02″W
- Area: less than one acre
- Built: 1910
- Architect: Wenzel Fritsche, Theodore E. Kraeft
- Architectural style: Bungalow/Craftsman
- NRHP reference No.: 04001264
- Added to NRHP: November 27, 2004

The Henry C. and Wilhemina Bruening House is a house located in north Portland, Oregon, listed (since November 27, 2004) on the National Register of Historic Places.

== See also ==
- National Register of Historic Places listings in North Portland, Oregon
