= Eliot, Portland, Oregon =

Eliot
- Neighborhood
- Interactive map of Eliot
- Coordinates: 45°32′28″N 122°40′07″W
- Country: United States
- State: Oregon
- City: Portland

Government
  - Association: Eliot Neighborhood Association
  - Coalition: Northeast Coalition of Neighborhoods

Area
  - Total: 0.84 sq mi (2.17 km^{2})

Population (2020)
  - Total: 5,514
  - Density: 6,580/sq mi (2,540/km^{2})

Housing
  - No. of households: 2724
  - Occupancy rate: 91.6%
  - Owner-occupied: 681 (25%)
  - Renting: 2043 (75%)
  - Avg. household size: 1.90 persons
- Time zone: UTC-8 (Pacific Standard Time)
  - Summer (DST): UTC-8 (Pacific Daylight Time)
- Postal code: 97217, 97227
- Website: eliotneighborhood.org

Eliot is a neighborhood in the North and Northeast sections of Portland, Oregon. It is approximately bounded by the Willamette River on the west, Interstate 405 and the Kerby Avenue approach to the Fremont Bridge on the northwest, NE Fremont Street on the north, NE 7th Avenue on the east, and NE/N Broadway on the south.

The neighborhood contains the old center of the former City of Albina before it was annexed by Portland in the late 19th century. Eliot was named in honor of Rev. Thomas L. Eliot, a pioneer minister.

== Schools ==
Three schools serve the neighborhood: Boise-Eliot/Humboldt Elementary School, Irvington Elementary School, Harriet Tubman Middle School, Grant High School, and Jefferson High School.

== Parks ==
- Lillis-Albina Park
- Dawson Park

== Points of interest ==
The Wonder Ballroom hosts concerts and other events at 128 NE Russell Street. The building was completed in 1914 as the meeting place for the local members of the Ancient Order of Hibernians. In 2004, the building was added to the National Register of Historic Places.

Legacy Emanuel Medical Center is one of only two Level I trauma centers in Oregon. It was founded in 1912 as Emanuel Hospital by the First Immanuel Lutheran Church of Portland. During the hospital's 1972 expansion, 300 homes and businesses were razed, displacing Black families that had lived in the area since the founding of Albina. Those families and their descendants formed the Emanuel Displaced Persons Association and its successor organization, EDPA2.
