= Albina, Oregon =

Former city in Oregon, US

Coordinates: 45°32′38″N 122°40′26″W

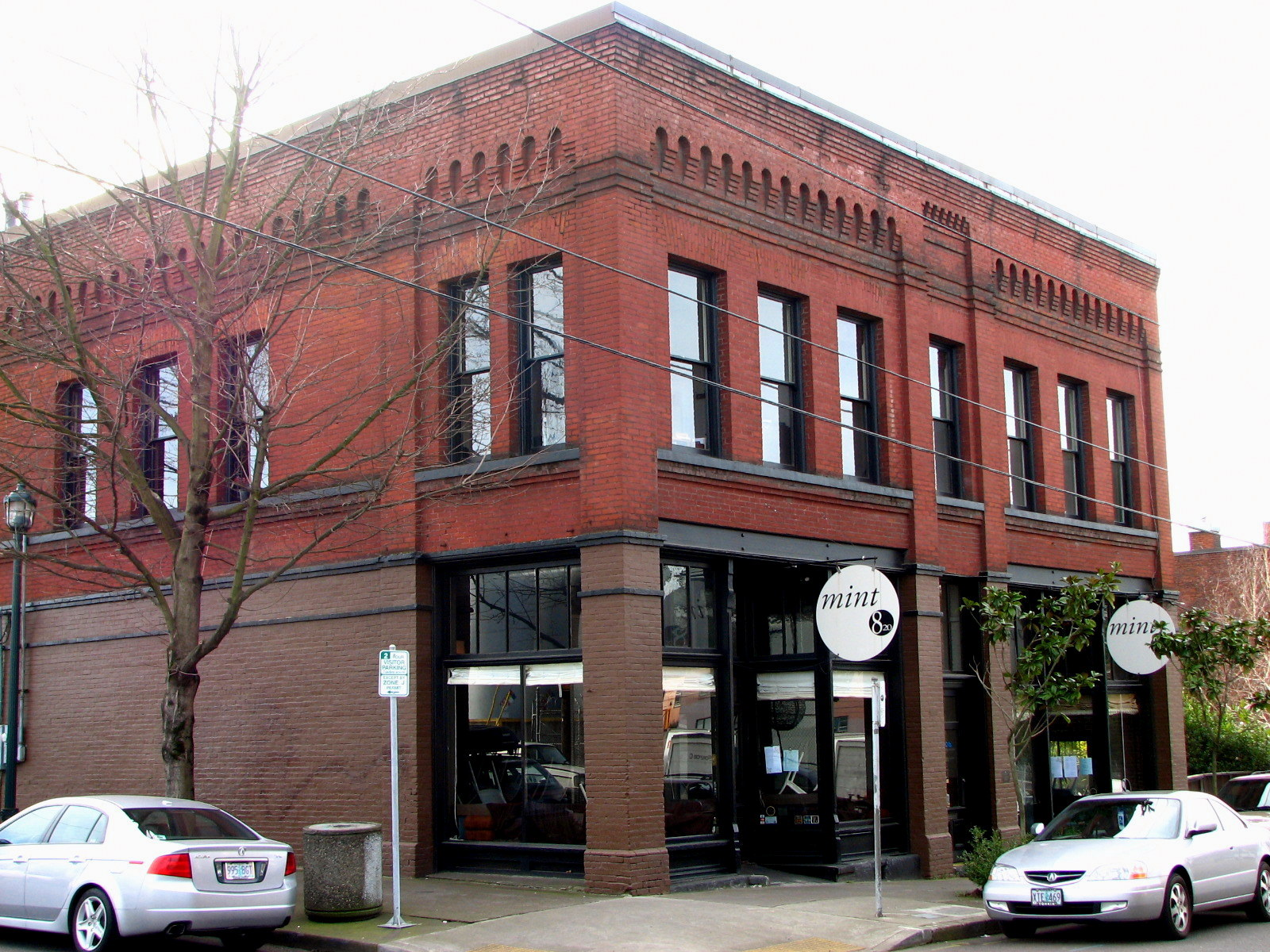
The Frederick Torgler Building was built in 1894 in the city of Albina

Albina is a historical American city that was consolidated into Portland, Oregon in 1891.

The land the City of Albina would later be built on was claimed by J.L. Losing and Joseph Delay under the U.S. Donation Land Claim Act of 1850. The land was then sold to William Winter Page. In 1872, Page sold the land to George Henry Williams and Edwin Russell, who laid out the original town site. Williams and Russell named the City of Albina for Page's wife and daughter, both of whom were named Albina.

In 1874, Russell went bankrupt and left Oregon for San Francisco. James Montgomery and William Reid then acquired the property and started residential development.

As of 1880, the population of Albina was 143 people. The city was incorporated in 1887 and by 1888, Albina's population was 3,000. The area was home to the Oregon Railroad and Navigation Company's Albina railroad yards, which employed many of the city's residents.

The original dimensions of Albina were modest: from Halsey Street north to Morris Street, and from the Willamette River to Margareta Avenue (later Union Avenue, and now Martin Luther King Jr. Boulevard). In 1889, Albina annexed the land north to Killingsworth Street and east to 24th. In 1891, Albina annexed everything north to Columbia Boulevard and west to the Portsmouth area. On July 6, 1891, Portland, East Portland, and Albina were consolidated into one city.

== See also ==
- Albina Library
- Albina Riot of 1967
- Albina Yard
- Albina Youth Opportunity School
- Frederick Torgler Building
- Patton Home
- Rinehart Building
