= Travis Nelson (politician) =

American politician (born 1978)

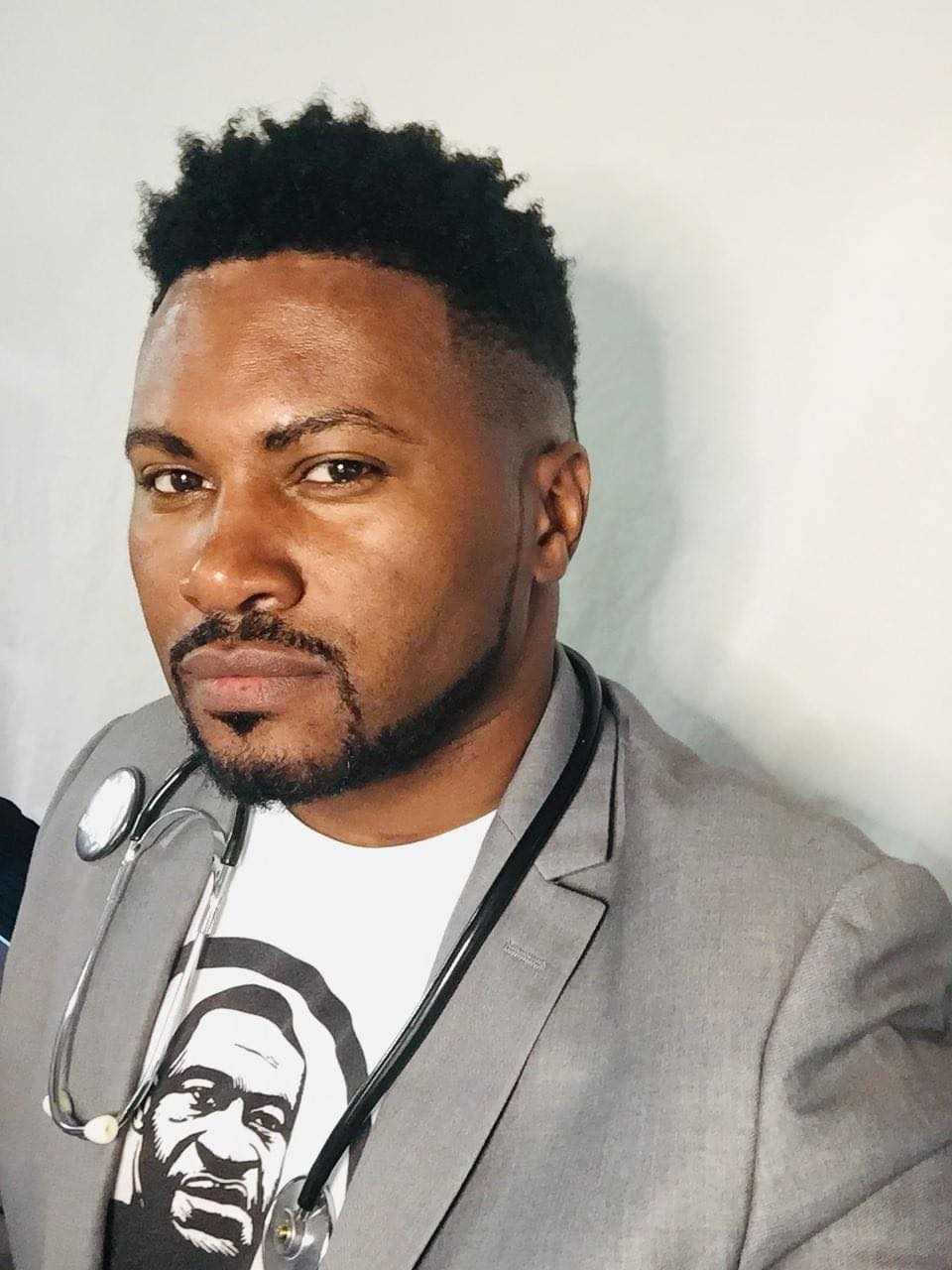

Member of the Oregon House of Representatives from the 44th district
- Incumbent
- Assumed office February 1, 2022
- Preceded by: Tina Kotek

Personal details
- Born: November 20, 1978 (age 47) Louisiana, U.S.
- Party: Democratic
- Education: Columbia Basin College (AS); Washington State University (BS)

Travis E. Nelson is an American politician and nurse serving as a member of the Oregon House of Representatives from the 44th district. He assumed office on February 1, 2022. He is the first openly LGBTQ+ man of color and the first openly LGBTQ+ African American to ever serve in the Oregon Legislature.

== Early life and education ==
Nelson is the grandson of Louisiana sharecroppers and his parents grew up under Jim Crow segregation. He was born in poverty in northern Louisiana to a teen mother. His parents moved he and his sister to Kennewick, Washington as a child, in search of a better life. While working as a janitor, landscaper, and coach, he earned an Associate of Science in Nursing degree from Columbia Basin Community College and went on to earn a Bachelor of Science in Nursing degree from Washington State University.

== Career ==
Travis Nelson started his career as a nurse for PeaceHealth in the Portland, Oregon area, specializing in medical, surgical, cardiac, rehabilitation and emergency nursing. Nelson is currently a union representative and the former vice president of the Oregon Nurses Association. Nelson was appointed to the Oregon House of Representatives in February 2022 by members of the Multnomah County Commission, succeeding Tina Kotek who went on to become governor.

=== Oregon House of Representatives ===
In his first legislative session, he secured $15 million for a new aquatic complex in North Portland. in 2022, he was appointed to serve on the state Reproductive Health and Access to Care Work Group in anticipation of the overturning of Roe v. Wade. This workgroup was charged with ensuring that Oregon closed gaps in reproductive health rights.

==== 2023 legislative session ====
In his second legislative session in 2023, Nelson championed the following laws:

- House Bill 2002 - Protects access to abortion services and gender affirming care.
- House Bill 2697 - Safe staffing legislation for hospital healthcare workers. This bill establishes nurse to patient ratios and establishes staffing committees for other healthcare workers. This makes Oregon the first state in the nation to put nurse to patient ratios in statute.
- House Bill 2921 - Requires hospitals to turn over employee gender and racial demographic data to the state for public posting. The stated goal is to increase the transparency of hospital workforce by job classification.
- House Bill 2922 - A consumer protection bill that increases contractor bonding amounts by $5,000 to better protect consumers taken advantage of by bad contractors.
- House Bill 2925 - Funds the work of creating policy proposals that address racism as a public health crisis.
- Senate Bill 851 - Requires the Oregon Bureau of Labor and Industries to prepare a model respectful workplace policy that addresses workplace bullying.
- Senate Bill 907 - Protects employees from retaliation if they refuse to work under dangerous conditions.
- Senate Bill 1089 - Establishes the Oregon Universal Healthcare Governance Board. The goal of this board is to create a plan for universal healthcare in Oregon.

==== 2024 legislative session ====
- Nelson secured $750,000 in funding for improvements to George Park in North Portland. George Park lies in the St. Johns neighborhood.
- Nelson worked with other legislators to secure $25 million in funding for Albina Vision Trust, a nonprofit Organization aiming to revitalize and reconnect the historically Black Albina community. The funding is aimed at restoring the wrongs done to the community by urban renewal and the Interstate 5 project in the middle of the 20th century.
- Nelson carried HB4004 on the floor of the House of Representatives. This legislation removed a requirement for the Bureau of Labor and Industries to refund penalties to companies that violated child labor law if there was also federal penalties. Nelson added an amendment that increased the maximum penalty for from $1,000 to $10,000 for violating child labor laws.

==== 2025 legislative session ====
- House Bill 2024 - Establishes a grant program designed to improve recruitment and retention of behavioral health workers. Also entitles a behavioral health worker to reinstatement with backpay if the employer unlawfully retaliates and added to regulations designed to improve behavioral worker safety.
- House Bill 2555 - Established the Family Sentencing Alternative Program. This bill allows certain parents or pregnant individuals facing at least one year of imprisonment to potentially receive alternative sentencing.
- House Bill 2741 - Directs the state of Oregon to maintain a state public health laboratory, administer a newborn bloodspot screening program and implement additional programs related to newborn bloodspot screening. Requires health care providers and health care facilities to ensure collection and delivery of specimens for newborn bloodspot screening and report certain test results.
- House Bill 2748 - Prohibits a non human entity (such as artificial intelligence) from using nursing titles.
- House Bill 2789 - Allows registered nurses to bill Medicaid for care management services.
- House Bill 2940 - Creates a program for providing emergency departments in real time, notifications that identify patients with hemoglobinopathies (such as sickle cell disease) and provide information on how to contact a hematologist.
- House Bill 2942 - Requires Medicaid to reimburse pharmacies and pharmacists in the same manner as other health care providers for pre-exposure and post-exposure HIV prevention treatment.
- House Bill 2944 - Permits a labor organization to file a civil action against a public employer for failing to provide information related to public employees in a timely manner.
- House Bill 2948 - Established that only a registered nurse may supervise a nurse in a school setting with respect to the practice of nursing. Also known as "Hannah's Law".
- House Bill 2957 - Prohibits employers from entering into agreements that shorten the statute of limitations with respect to discrimination and sexual harassment claims. Ensures that workers have five years to pursue discrimination and sexual harassment lawsuits.
- House Bill 3003 - Modifies the list of data that the Oregon Department of Human Services must include in its annual reports about foster children. Information in the report must be disaggregated by race.
- Senate Bill 450 - Established November 14 of each year as Ruby Bridges Walk to School Day, named after Ruby Bridges.
- Senate Bill 537 - Established new workplace violence prevention requirements for certain healthcare facilities.
- Senate Bill 1098 - Prohibits discrimination based on the protected class of the author or topic when selecting or retaining school library materials, textbooks or instructional materials or when developing and implementing a curriculum.
- Senate Bill 1168 - Prohibits per-visit compensation for home health care and home hospice care staff.
- Senate Bill 1175 - Established a task force designed to remove barriers to jury service.
- Senate Bill 1182 - Allows the Oregon Department of Transportation to gift, lease or sell surplus real property of the Interstate 5 Rose Quarter Project to Albina Vision Trust, Inc. for Black community restoration.
- House Resolution 3 - Recognizes and honors the history of Oregon's Black drag performers.

== Political views and activism ==
Nelson is a staunch progressive and a member of the Democratic Socialists of America. He is known for his support of unions, workers' rights, single payer healthcare, climate activism, reproductive rights, LGBTQ+ rights and racial justice. He is also a member of the board of CAP Northwest (formerly Cascade AIDS Project).

=== Democratic Party Activism ===
In 2017, Nelson became an officer of the Democratic Party of Oregon when he was elected to serve as one of Oregon's representatives to the Democratic National Committee. One of his first acts as a Democratic National Committee Rep was supporting Keith Ellison in the 2017 Democratic National Committee Chair Race. Nelson has authored and successfully passed multiple resolutions in an effort to make the Democratic Party of Oregon more progressive. Some of those resolutions include:

- Resolution 2020-09 - The first ever Democratic Party of Oregon resolution declaring that Black Lives Matter.
- Resolution 2020-010 - Resolution demanding justice for George Floyd.
- Resolution 2021-02 - Resolution declaring support for unions, workers, clean energy jobs and a $15 an hour national minimum wage.
- Resolution 2021-03 - Resolution supporting essential workers on the front lines of the COVID-19 pandemic.
- Resolution 2021-09 - Resolution calling on Oregon Congresspersons to support efforts to lower drug costs for those on Medicare.
- Resolution 2021-10 - Resolution demanding that Congressman Kurt Schrader support Medicare prescription drug negotiation.
- Resolution 2022-10 - Honoring the life and legacy of Lawanda Joyce Manning, who was married to Oregon Senator James Manning.

In 2020, Nelson served as chair of Oregon's Bernie Sanders delegation and Oregon delegation co-chair to the 2020 Democratic National Convention.

== Electoral history ==
2024 Oregon State Representative, 44th district
Party	Candidate	Votes	%
Democratic	Travis Nelson	27,281	98.3
Write-in		474	1.7
Total votes		27,755	100%

2022 Oregon House of Representatives 44th district election
Party	Candidate	Votes	%
Democratic	Travis Nelson (incumbent)	26,429	87.65
Republican	Rolf Schuler	3,444	11.42
Constitution	Morgan Hinthorne	232	0.77
Write-in		47	0.16
Total votes		30,152	100.0

2022 Oregon House of Representatives 44th district Democratic primary
Party	Candidate	Votes	%
Democratic	Travis Nelson (incumbent)	10,271	91.35
Democratic	Eric Delehoy	948	8.43
Democratic	Write-in	25	0.22
Total votes		11,244	100.0

== See also ==
- Politics of Oregon
