= Albina, Portland, Oregon =

Collection of neighborhoods in Portland, Oregon

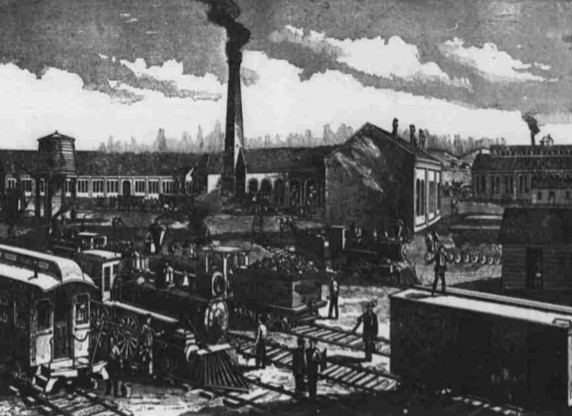
1891 Union Pacific Railroad Company Albina, Oregon

Albina is a collection of neighborhoods located in the North and Northeast sections of Portland, Oregon, United States. During the latter half of the 20th century, Albina was home to the majority of Portland’s African American population. The area derives its name from Albina, Oregon, a historical American city that was consolidated into Portland in 1891. Albina includes the modern Portland neighborhoods of Eliot, Boise, Humboldt, Overlook, and Piedmont.

== History ==
Historic Albina was a company town controlled by the Union Pacific Railroad before its annexation to the city of Portland in 1891. In the 1870s and 1880s, most of the Albina residents were new immigrants from Europe who worked at either the Union Pacific Railroad terminal or on the docks. Over the next two decades, while most African American residents of Portland rented homes or apartments on the west side of the Willamette River, wealthy Portlanders began to purchase land in east Portland in the Albina neighborhood.

However, by 1910 the African American neighborhoods in Northwest Portland were overcrowded and residents crossed the river to look for homes in Lower Albina for its proximity to jobs at the docks or with the railroad. In response, the newer, white neighborhoods in east Portland adopted more restrictive regulations, which effectively confined the east Portland African American home-seekers to the Albina area. These restrictive real estate practices were racially motivated and effective. "In 1919, the Portland Realty Board adopted a rule declaring it unethical for an agent to sell property to either Negro or Chinese people in a White neighborhood. The Realtors felt that it was best to declare a section of the city for them so that the projected decrease in property values could be contained within limited spatial boundaries."

At the same time, the houses in Albina were among the first owned by Portland's African Americans since housing in the neighborhood was affordable and accessible. Additionally, the transportation system was good and men could find jobs working for the railroad.

== World War II ==
The community grew slowly until World War II, when large numbers of workers were needed to support the war effort; most African American workers worked in large shipbuilding yards on the Columbia and Willamette Rivers. The influx of workers created a housing shortage, which was keenly felt by the African Americans who faced discrimination.

In 1942, a large community housing development, called Vanport, was built in outer North Portland to house shipyard workers. The 1948 Columbia River flood destroyed Vanport and displaced over 16,000 people. The African American residents who lost their homes faced limited housing options and many who moved back to Albina rented the aging homes or apartments vacated when white Portlanders moved to the suburbs.

== Post World War II ==
Between 1940 and 1960, the African American population in Albina grew dramatically as white residents moved out. More than 21,000 left for the suburbs or other Portland neighborhoods. By 1960, African-Americans totaled only 2% of the Portland's population and 80% lived in the Albina neighborhood. As a result of this racial disparity, black representation in city government and civic institutions was nearly non-existent.

== Urban renewal and worsening conditions ==
In the early 1950s, residents opened their own shops, restaurants, and clubs to serve the black community; however, in the mid 1950s through early 1960s, most residents lived in sub-standard housing and community proposals for urban renewal were rejected. Without access to capital, housing conditions worsened to the point that abandonment became a major problem. "The real estate industry (government housing officials, Realtors, bankers, appraisers, and landlords), by denying access to conventional mortgage loans, played a pivotal role in perpetuating the absentee ownership and predatory lending practices that fueled the decline in housing conditions. Many Black residents were denied the opportunity to own homes when they were affordable."

In the 1960s, the construction of the Interstate-5 freeway cut through neighborhoods, displacing many residents and local businesses. The area continued to struggle: the Model Cities Program meant to revitalize the area had limited success, the Emanuel Hospital expansion created worse economic blight, residents didn't have mortgage capital to purchase homes, and violence increased.

The neighborhood was the site of the Albina Riot of 1967.

== Present day ==
Community members continue to organize, most recently forming the Albina Vision Trust, a project to build affordable housing and restore land in North and Northeast Portland.

== See also ==
- Legacy Emanuel Medical Center
- Redlining
