= Bernstein's Bagels =

Bagel shop in Portland, Oregon, U.S.

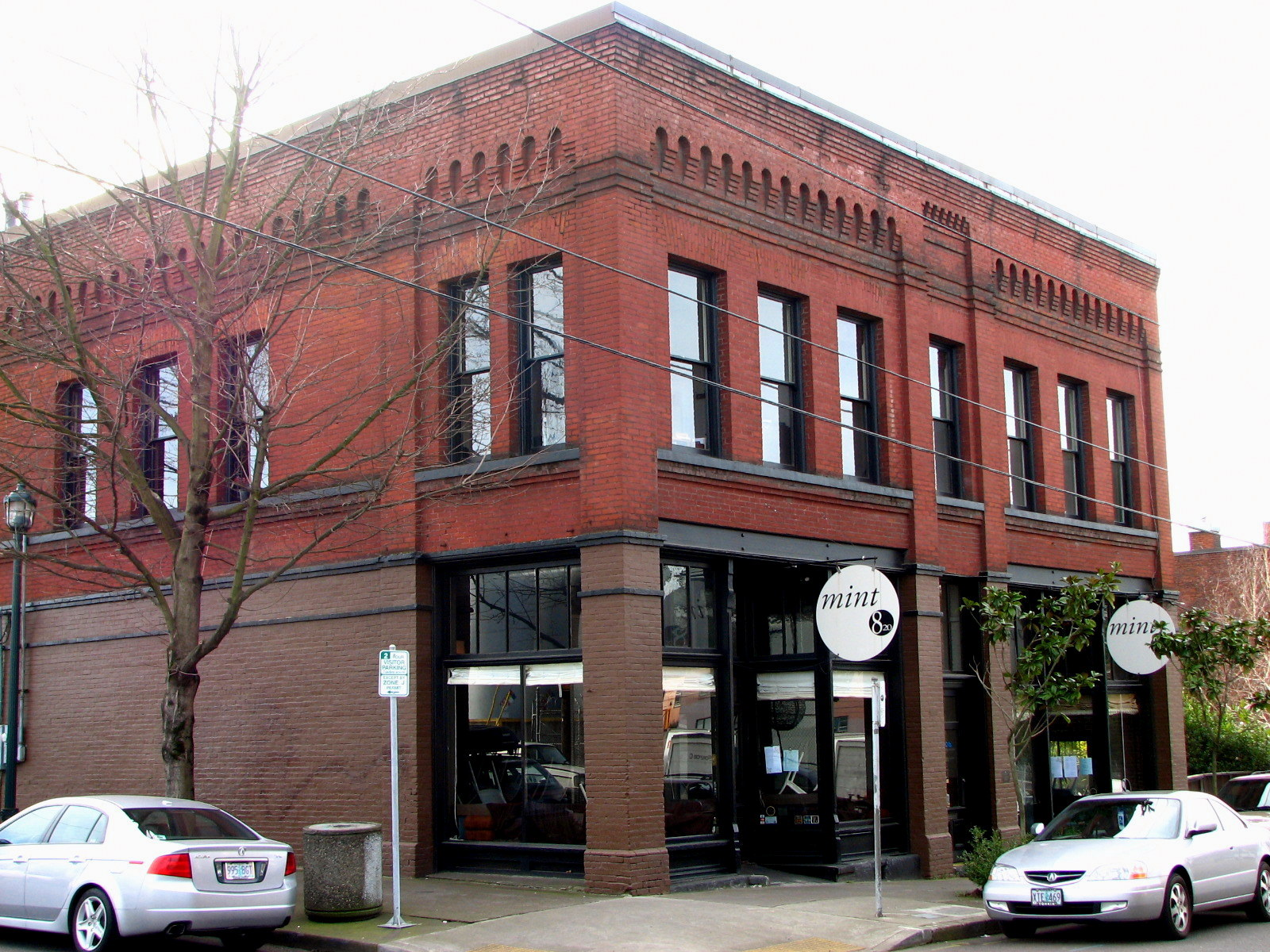
- 2008 photograph of the exterior of the Frederick Torgler Building, which housed Bernstein's Bagels starting in 2018
- Interactive map of Bernstein's Bagels

Restaurant information
- Established: 2016
- Owners: Noah Bernstein; Peter Hurteau
- Location: 816 North Russell Street, Portland, Multnomah, Oregon, 97227, United States
- Coordinates: 45.5409°N 122.6750°W
- Seating capacity: 25–30
- Website: bernsteinsbagels.com

Bernstein's Bagels is a bagel shop in Portland, Oregon, United States. Noah Bernstein and Peter Hurteau started the business in 2016, and opened a brick and mortar shop in North Portland's St. Johns neighborhood in 2017. Bernstein and Hurteau opened an outpost in the Eliot neighborhood's Frederick Torgler Building in 2018, briefly operating two shops before the building that housed the original shop was sold.

Bernstein's serves bagels with schmears and sides like eggs, lox, and prosciutto, as well as bagel sandwiches, coffee, and tea. The business has garnered a positive reception. Bon Appétit and Food & Wine have included Bernstein's in overviews of the nation's best bagels.

== Description ==
Bernstein's Bagels has a shop in the North Portland part of the Eliot neighborhood, and previously operated in the St. Johns neighborhood. The shop has a seating capacity of approximately 25 to 30 people, a counter with white tile, and Art Nouveau wallpaper with paintings.

The menu includes eight regular bagel varieties, plus pumpernickel on weekends. Sides for bagels include eggs, lox, and prosciutto. Among schmears are two called 'I Shallotted the Dijons' and 'Twin Leeks and Honey'. The 'Mama Lil's' schmear is cream cheese with pickled goat peppers and the 'Raisin Schmearizona' has cream cheese with brown sugar and honey-macerated raisins. The Popper is a bagel sandwich with avocado, egg, sweet onion, and pickled pepper schmear. The Oregon trout salad sandwich has caramelized fennel and Old Bay Seasoning.

Bernstein's serves coffee by Nossa Familia and tea by Steven Smith.

== History ==
Business partners Noah Bernstein and Peter Hurteau started Bernstein's Bagels in 2016. Bernstein had been making bagels at his house for approximately two years. The company's bagels were available at farmers' markets, Townshend's Teahouses, and Museum Grounds, the coffee shop at the Portland Art Museum.

In February 2017, Willamette Week reported that Bernstein and Hurteau were planning to open a brick and mortar shop in St. Johns by early April. The shop opened in on May 19, operating Tuesdays through Sundays.

Bernstein's sold approximately 300–500 bagels a day, as of 2018. In November, Bernstein and Hurteau announced plans to open a second location in the Frederick Torgler Building, which previously housed the craft cocktail bar Mint, in Eliot in December. The duo wanted an outpost since the building in St. Johns was put up for sale. The second location opened on December 22, 2018. The St. Johns location closed.

Bernstein's offered delivery during the COVID-19 pandemic. In 2022, the shop hosted Bialy Bird, a pop-up restaurant specializing in bialys. Bernstein's got rid of tipping and implemented a service charge in 2024, in order to make wages more consistent and fund employee benefits.

== Reception ==
In 2017, Sophia June of Willamette Week said Bernstein's "is making some of the best bagels in the city". The business was a runner-up in the Best Bagel category of the newspaper's annual readers' roll in 2022 and 2024. It was a finalist in the same category in 2025. Michael Russell included the shop in The Oregonian's 2019 overview of the forty best inexpensive eateries in the Portland metropolitan area. Sunset magazine included the Super-Seedy Poppy-Seed Bagel in a 2019 overview of West Coast bagels that "deserve a nosh". During the pandemic, Alex Frane included the business in Thrillist's 2020 list of Portland's best sandwiches for "perfect picnic food". David Landsel included Bernstein's in Food & Wine's 2021 list of the best bagels in the U.S., and Bon Appétit included the business in a 2023 overview of the nation's best bagels outside New York.

Brooke Jackson-Glidden included the prosciutto bagel in Eater Portland's 2019 list of the city's "hottest new cheap plates". In 2021, Frane included Bernstein's in Eater Portland's list of seventeen restaurants for "amazing" breakfast sandwiches, and he and Ron Scott recommended the bagels as one of Portland's "most potent" hangover remedies. Jackson-Glidden and others included the business in a 2024 overview of the city's ten best "real-deal" bagel shops. Zuri Anderson included Bernstein's in iHeart's 2021 list of Portland's best breakfast restaurants. In 2024, Sara Klimek selected the shop to represent Oregon in Tasting Table's list of the best bagel shops in each U.S. state, based on online reviews. Kilmek said the business offers "perfectly chewy" bagels in a "comforting" space, and wrote: "The vibe ... is definitely on par with Portland. Visitors ranked this shop a 4.7 on Google Reviews and 4.5 on Yelp." DB Kelly included Bernstein's in Chowhound's 2026 list of the best bagels in each U.S. state, based on reviews.
