= 1803 Fund =

Organization based in Portland, Oregon, U.S.

- Formation: 2023; 3 years ago
- Tax ID no.: 92-2585176
- Legal status: nonprofit
- Location: Portland, Oregon, U.S.
- CEO: Rukaiyah Adams
- Board of directors: 3 members
- Key people: Larry G. Miller (Chair); John Donahoe (Treasurer)
- Revenue: $55.6 million (2025)
- Expenses: $21.8 million (2025)
- Endowment: $40.8 million (2025)
- Website: 1803fund.com

The 1803 Fund is a nonprofit organization based in Portland, Oregon, seeking to redevelop historically Black areas in North and Northeast Portland. The organization was established in 2023, after Penny and Phil Knight pledged $400 million to the fund.

== History ==
The 1803 Fund was established in April 2023, with a $400 million pledge from Phil and Penny Knight. Ron Herndon and Tony Hopson, Black leaders of two North Portland nonprofit organizations, Albina Head Start and Self Enhancement Inc. initiated the idea for the 1803 Fund in a series of conversations about investing in the Albina neighborhood with Phil Knight, a Portland native and founder of Nike. Knight and Bill Bowerman launched the idea for Nike with a handshake in the Lower Albina area. Rukaiyah Adams, a co-founder of the 1803 Fund, is an alumna of Albina Head Start.

Broadway Bridge, Willamette River, Veterans Memorial Coliseum, and Moda Center. Aerial view. Albina Portland.

The Albina neighborhood is the historical cultural and residential center for Portland’s Black community; the neighborhood became splintered in the 1960s and 1970s because of urban renewal and gentrification projects, such as Veterans Memorial Coliseum construction (opened in 1960); Interstate 5 development (completed in 1961); and Legacy Emanuel Hospital (expanded facility opened in 1972).

In 2023, the 1803 Fund hired its first two employees, North Portland natives Adams and D'Artagnan Calamin. Adams, the 1803 Fund's current chief executive officer, founded Albina Vision Trust and served as chief investment officer of Meyer Memorial Trust. Caliman serves as the 1803 Fund's vice president of community partnerships.

According to Oregon Public Broadcasting (OPB), the 1803 Fund was established "to help investors rebuild some of the economic prosperity and community spaces destroyed by racist urban renewal policies and projects", and "focuses on building community areas for education, arts programs, housing and youth development." Adams serves on the OPB board of directors.

Adams' stated longterm goal is to build a $1 billion endowment for the 1803 Fund. In 2025, the 1803 Fund had an endowment of approximately $41 million.

== Grantmaking ==
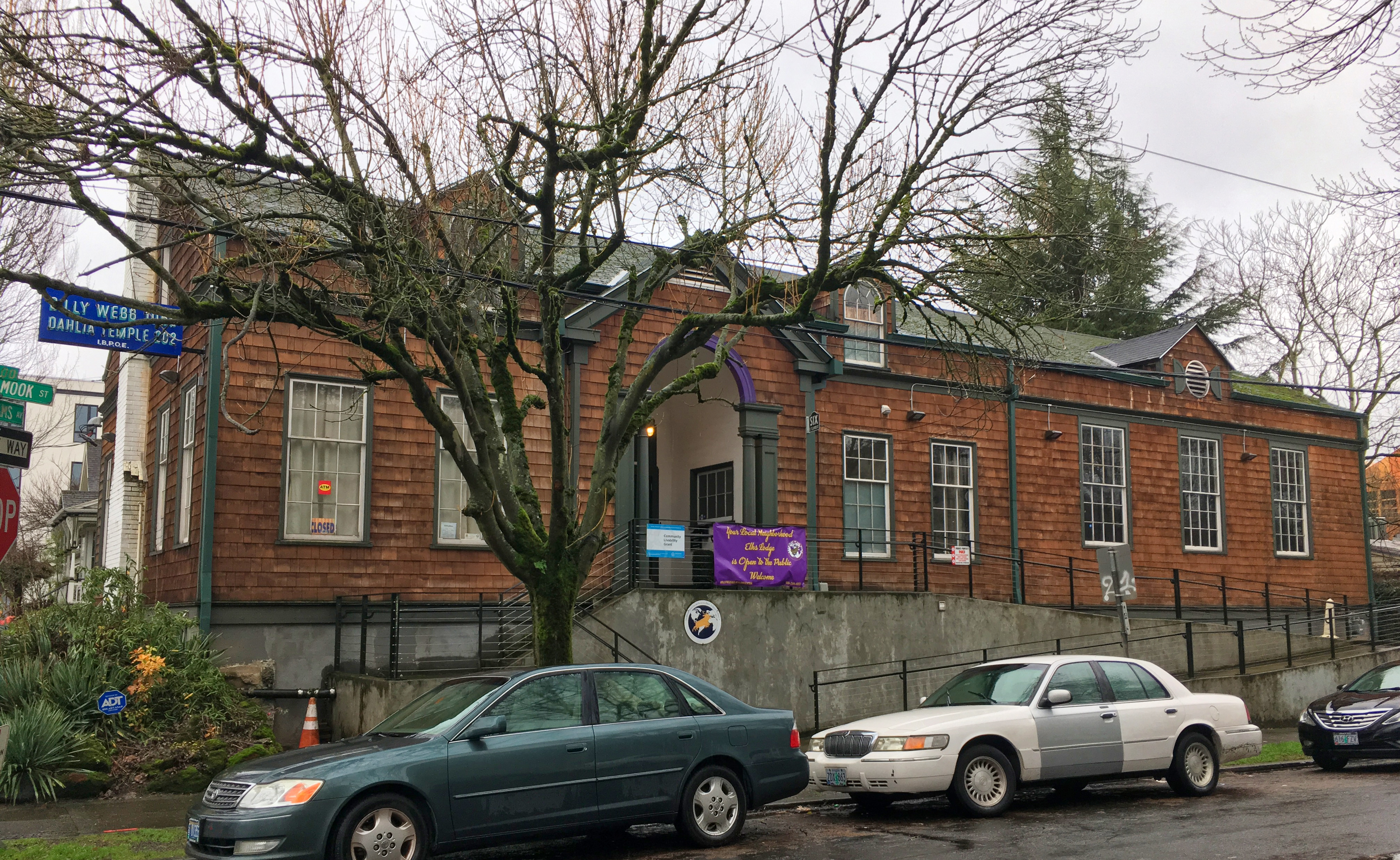
Exterior of the Billy Webb Elks Lodge

Since its inception, the 1803 Fund has donated more than $24 million to nonprofit organizations. In May 2026, the 1803 Fund donated $300,000 to restore the Billy Webb Elks Lodge in North Portland, an historic landmark in the Black community. The 1803 Fund also made a four-year commitment to support the lodge.

=== Albina Head Start and Self Enhancement ===
In August 2025, the 1803 Fund announced a 10-year, $75 million commitment to Self Enhancement Inc. and Albina Head Start, two nonprofits organizations located in North and Northeast Portland. As part of the gift, each organization will receive $25 million over a 10-year period, and redistribute an additional $2.5 million annually to nonprofit organizations in Portland that provide education and services to the Black community.

=== Albina Vision Trust ===
In 2017, the 1803 Fund's current CEO, Rukaiyah Adams, founded the Albina Vision Trust. In 2024, the 1803 Fund donated $2.1 million to the Albina Vision Trust. In 2025, the 1803 Fund donated $1.8 million to the Albina Vision Trust. In addition to being a major donor to Albina Vision Trust, the 1803 Fund provided the Albina Vision Trust with a $4.3 million loan in 2025.

=== For the Future. For the Culture. ===
The 1803 Fund's initial project, “Rebuild Albina”, invested in “education, place and culture and belonging in the Albina neighborhood." In 2024, the 1803 Fund announced that it had awarded eight million dollars in "For the Future. For the Culture" grants to 11 Portland community organizations. The donations were distributed in two categories: 1. Place and 2. Culture.

1. Place

- Albina Vision Trust: $2.1 million grant;
- Arrive (formerly Portland Housing Center): $1.1 million grant;
- Taking Ownership PDX: $550,000 grant; and
- Williams & Russell: $1.3 million grant. (It was reported that the 1803 Fund donated $2.5 million to the Williams & Russell Project in 2024).

2. Culture

- Albina Music Trust: $550,000 grant;
- Friends of Interstate Firehouse Cultural Center: $435,000 grant;
- Micro Enterprise Services of Oregon: $400,000 grant;
- Oregon Black Pioneers: $550,000 grant;
- Portland Art Museum: $1.1 million grant;
- PRISMID Sanctuary: $550,000 grant; and
- World Stage Theater: $300,000 grant.

In 2025, the 1803 Fund expanded its grants program and awarded more than $15 million to 32 nonprofit organizations. These award recipients include:

- Albina Head Start: $2.5 million grant;
- Albina Music Trust: $527,5000 grant;
- Albina Vision Trust: $1.8 million grant;
- Arrive (formerly Portland Housing Center): $1 million grant;
- Black Women on Boards: $150,000 grant;
- BMe Community: $125,000 grant;
- Micro Enterprise Services of Oregon: $380,000 grant;
- Lewis College of Business / Pensole Lewis Portland: $125,000 grant;
- Oregon Black Pioneers: $500,000 grant;
- Portland Art Museum: $1 million grant;
- PRISMID Sanctuary: $500,000 grant;
- Self Enhancement, Inc.: $5 million grant;
- Taking Ownership PDX: $500,000 grant;
- Williams & Russell: $312,500 grant; and
- World Stage Theater: $250,000 grant.

=== Portland Art Museum ===
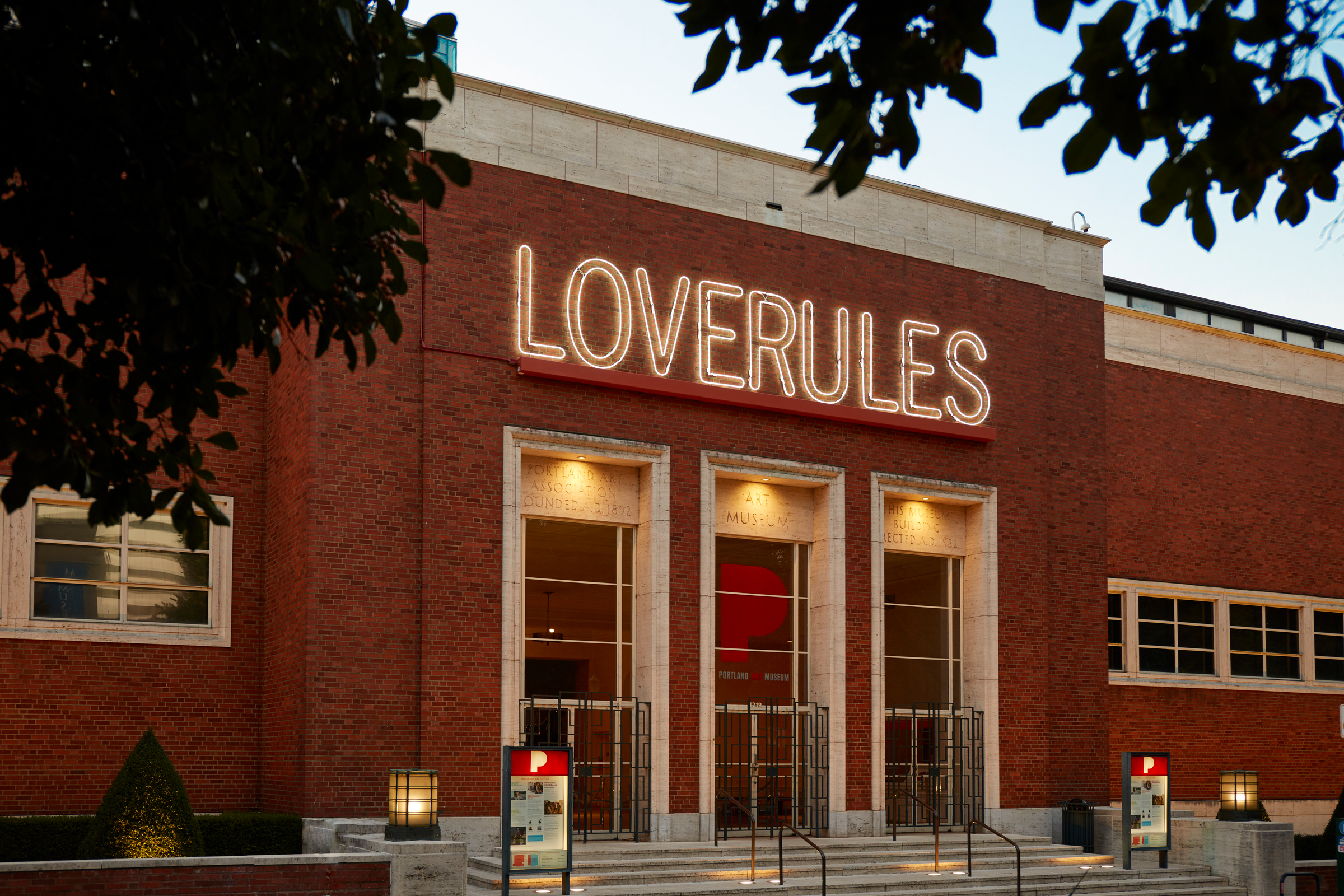
Hank Willis Thomas, "LOVERULES," Portland Art Museum (exterior), as part of "Hank Willis Thomas: All Things Being Equal...", October 12, 2019 – January 12, 2020.

In 2025, the Portland Art Museum announced that it had received a multi-year grant from the 1803 Fund to create a Black Art and Experiences Gallery in the museum's lower level. In 2024, the 1803 Fund awarded $1.1 million to the Portland Art Museum, and in 2025, the 1803 Fund donated an additional $1 million dollars to the downtown Portland museum. In 2026, the 1803 Fund launched Black History Month with a celebration at the museum, including a moderated conversation with the 1803 Fund's Adams and visual artist Nick Cave.

== Real estate development ==
The 1803 Fund has announced two real estate developments in North Portland to regenerate historically Black neighborhoods. According to Adams, the 1803 Fund has purchased "20 parcels" in the Albina neighborhood for "new construction, renovation, and preservation."

=== Albina Riverside ===
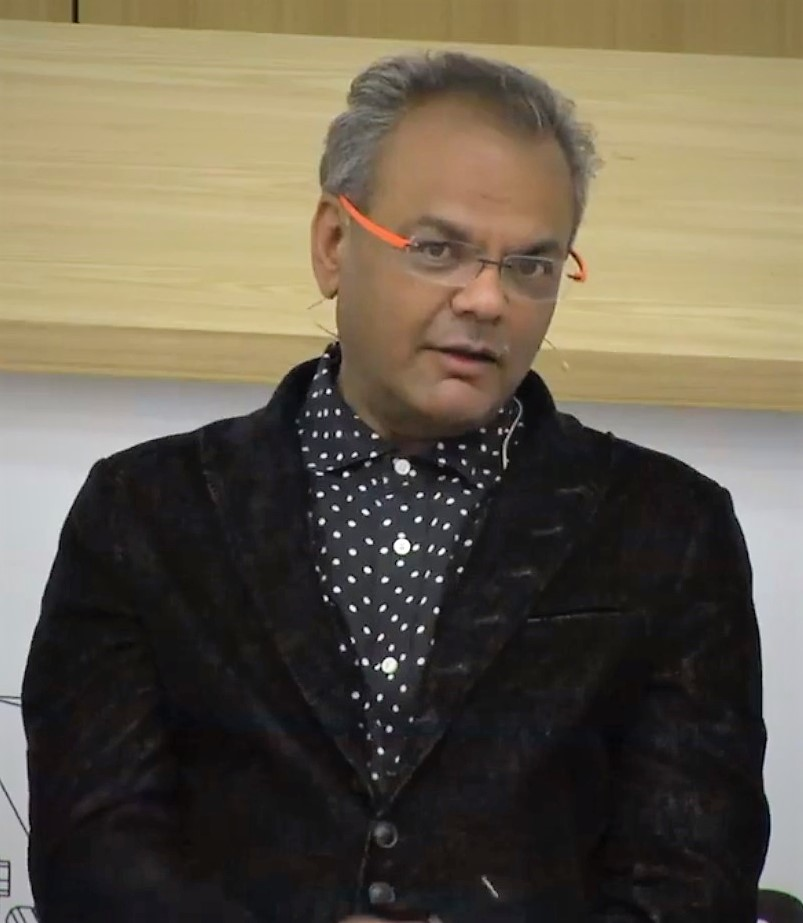
Structural engineer Hanif Kara, 2018

The Albina Riverside development project includes the purchase of approximately $70 million of real estate in the Albina neighborhood. In 2025, the 1803 Fund announced that it had purchased a 3-acre parcel near the Moda Center. The post-industrial waterfront site features a 1914 grain terminal that was a key trading port for Pacific Northwest. To develop Albina Riverside, the 1803 Fund is partnering with structural engineer Hanif Kara; development partner project^; consultant Natanya Jones; master planner Jennifer Bonner/MALL Team; and firms AD—WO, MALL and Wayside Studio; and Amen, Amen. Studio. Albina Riverside will include a 16-story hotel designed by MALL. It is expected that the Albina Riverside development will connect the Rose Quarter section of Portland with the Willamette River. As of September 2026, the 1803 Fund has not released a completion timeline for the Albina Riverside project.

=== The Low End ===
The Low End development is located at the western end of Russell Street, south of the Fremont Bridge and west of Interstate 5.

== See also ==
- Sneaker Week
