= Prosper Portland =

Economic development corporation in Oregon, US

Agency overview
- Jurisdiction: Portland, Oregon
- Parent Service Area: Community & Economic Development
- Website: https://prosperportland.us/

Prosper Portland, formerly the Portland Development Commission (PDC), is the community development corporation created by the city of Portland, Oregon. It promotes development, housing projects and economic development within the city's eleven urban renewal districts.

As of 2025, Prosper Portland is overseen by the city’s Community & Economic Development service area, led by Deputy City Administrator for Community and Economic Development Donnie Oliveira.

In February 2025, Prosper Portland issued a loan that did not meet its own risk guidelines to a startup athletic wear company called Made in Old Town. Applications by Made in Old Town for additional funding were denied by Oregon regional government Portland Metro and the Portland Clean Energy Fund.

Propser Portland has an Office of Small Business.

== History ==
In May 2017, the Portland City Council voted to change PDC's name to Prosper Portland.

It has controversially sought to establish measurable standards for workplace diversity among its contractors.
