= Portland Fashion Week =

Event in Portland, Oregon, U.S.

- Logo
- Location: Portland, Oregon
- Country: United States
- Website: portlandfashionweek.net

Portland Fashion Week is a fashion week in Portland, Oregon, United States. It is the nation's third oldest fashion week.

The 2008 event was held at the 14 Square building. In 2015, PFW sought to be "the world’s only carbon negative fashion week, incorporating the use of Solarmors 50,000-watt solar-powered generator, LED lighting and soy-based inks on post-consumer recycled papers for all printed materials", according to the Statesman Journal.

== See also ==
- Culture of Portland, Oregon
- Fashion in the United States
- List of fashion events
- Sneaker Week
- Sustainability in Portland, Oregon
