= Patton Home =

Historic building in Portland, Oregon, U.S.

Coordinates: 45.5565°N 122.6774°W

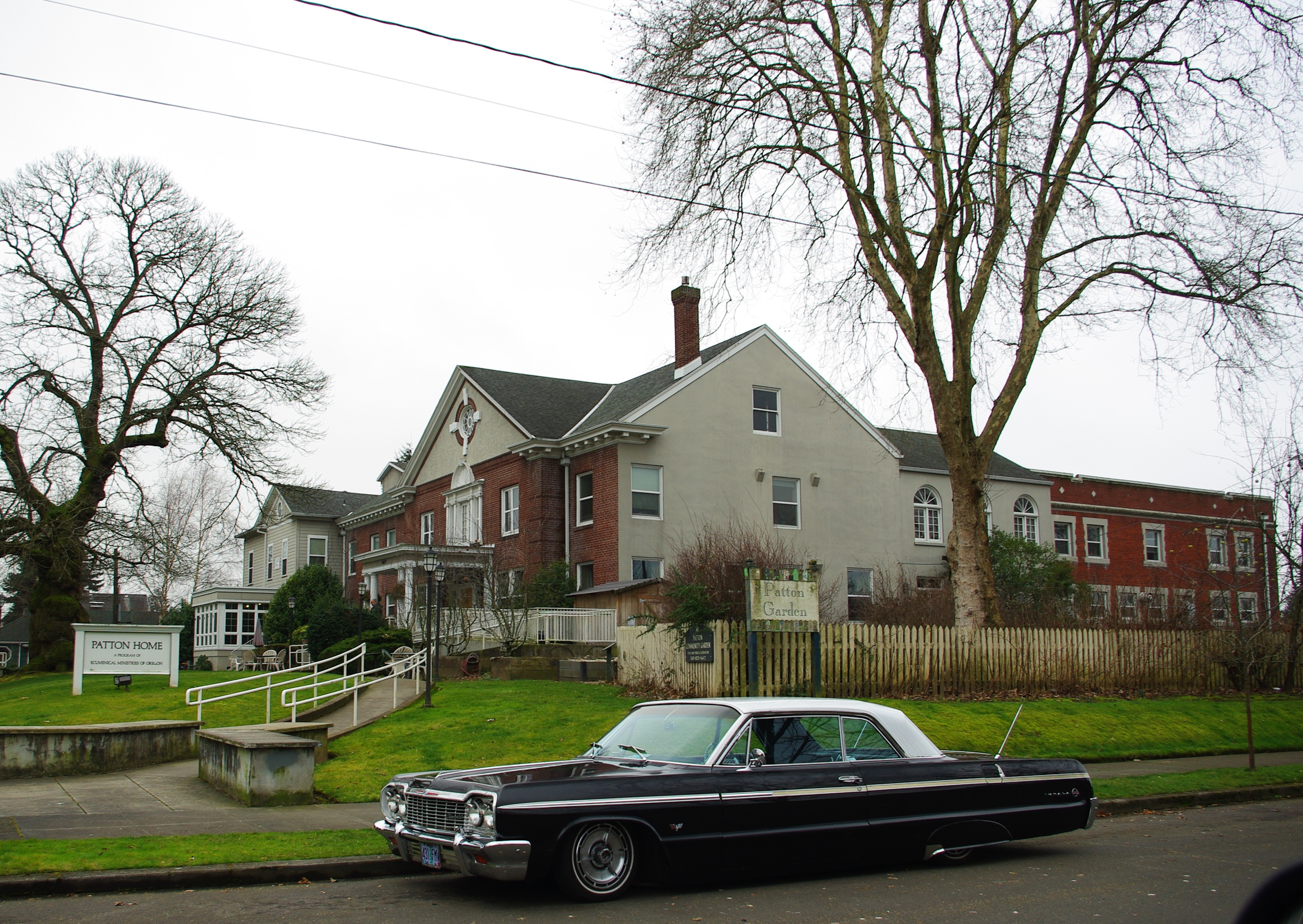
Patton Home in 2013

The Patton Home is a historic building and low-income housing facility in Portland, Oregon, United States. It was once known as the Patton Home for the Friendless. It was listed on the National Register of Historic Places in 2021.

== History ==
The building, originally used as a retirement home, was built in 1890 on Michigan Avenue in the Humboldt district of Portland. Matthew Patton, who arrived in Oregon in 1847, donated the land for use as a home for the aged. Since its opening, the Patton Home has served the Humboldt neighborhood of north Portland for over 100 years. The Patton Home offers shelter and care for those in need.

During the late 1990s, the Patton Home was purchased by the Ecumenical Ministries of Oregon (EMO), which then invested $6 million in renovating the building in order to briefly operate the Patton Home as a residential care facility. It is now an SRO (single room occupancy)-style apartment building with shared kitchenettes and bathrooms.

The grounds of the Patton Home occupy a whole block of Michigan Avenue between Blandena and N. Going, and are located on the east side of Interstate 5. The grounds also contain a community garden.
