= Albina Riot of 1967 =

1967 race riot in Portland, Oregon

- Part of Long, hot summer of 1967
- Date: July 30, 1967
- Location: Albina District, Portland, Oregon, U.S.

Parties
	Portland Bureau of Police

Lead figures
	Mayor of Portland: Terry Schrunk; Governor of Oregon: Tom McCall

Casualties
- Arrested: 115
- Damage: $50,000 in property damage dealt

The Albina Riot of 1967 occurred in the Albina District of Portland, Oregon, during a year when other cities were experiencing similar civil rights demonstrations and urban unrest.

== Background ==
On July 30, 1967, a group of 100 to 150 people gathered in Irving Park. They were there to hear speakers from Portland, Seattle, and San Francisco talk about civil rights, poverty and unemployment, institutionalized discrimination, and police brutality.

In addition to other activist leaders, attendees expected Eldridge Cleaver, Minister of Information for the Black Panther Party, to make an appearance at the event. After days of rumors there would be civil unrest at the event, parents, ministers, and community leaders urged people to stay home. Police increased their patrols and were present at the event. Cleaver did not appear and tensions increased; young people threw rocks and bottles at the police. The disturbance quickly escalated when the group moved to nearby Union Avenue and set fires, broke windows, and looted a stereo store. The next night saw similar unrest and damage, but the police responded immediately. Mayor Terry Schrunk and Governor Tom McCall alerted the National Guard and State Police and asked them to remain close enough to respond within 10 to 15 minutes if they were needed.

The incident left some businesses permanently closed. The riots resulted in 115 arrests and over $50,000 in damaged property.

== See also ==
- Portland foreclosure protest
