= Sneaker Week =

Annual event in Portland, Oregon, U.S.

- Logo
- Status: Active
- Frequency: Annually
- Location: Portland, Oregon
- Country: United States
- Website: sneakerweekpdx.com

Sneaker Week (sometimes Sneaker Week PDX or Sneaker Week Portand), is an annual festival in Portland, Oregon, United States. Herbert Beauclere and Megan Davis co-founded the event in 2017. Sneaker Week "celebrates the city's place as one of the epicenters of the athletic footwear industry", according to Matthew Kish of The Oregonian.

In 2026, the event partnered with the 1803 Fund and hosted activities in the Lower Albina district.

== See also ==
- Culture of Portland, Oregon
- Fashion in the United States
- List of festivals in the United States
- Portland Fashion Week
- Sneaker collecting
