= Sustainability in Portland, Oregon =

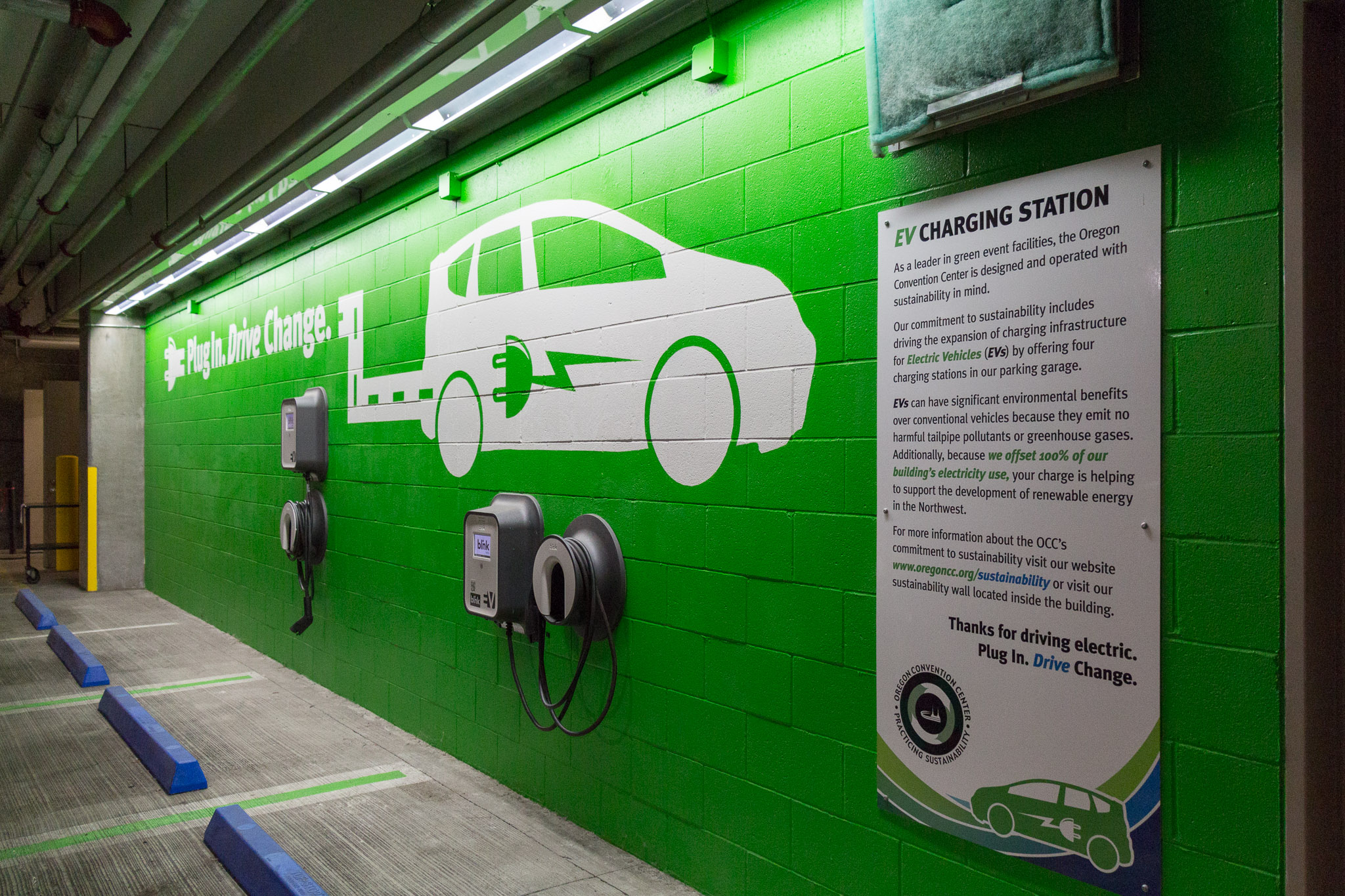
Electric vehicle charging station at the Oregon Convention Center in 2017

The American city of Portland, Oregon, is known for supporting sustainability and has been described as a "top city for urban sustainability". According to KOIN, "The City of Roses is known as one of the best cities for cycling in the U.S. and its parks per capita rank among the highest in the country. If one thing's for certain, this city loves going green. Portlanders also put their money where their mind is when it comes to supporting the environment. The city is filled with businesses and organizations that focus on sustainability, reducing waste, and renewing energy." Portland has also seen efforts to reduce food loss and waste.

In 2024, Time Out said the city "has been the butt of the joke for many years", including from Portlandia-era harmless teasing about the city's preoccupation with sustainable food". In 2025, VegNews called Portland "a pioneer in the sustainable vegan lifestyle" and said the city "showcases a high density of vegan establishments relative to its population", with 46 vegan restaurants and 103 vegan businesses. Portland set the Guinness World Record for the largest electric bicycle group ride in 2026.

== Local government and initiatives ==
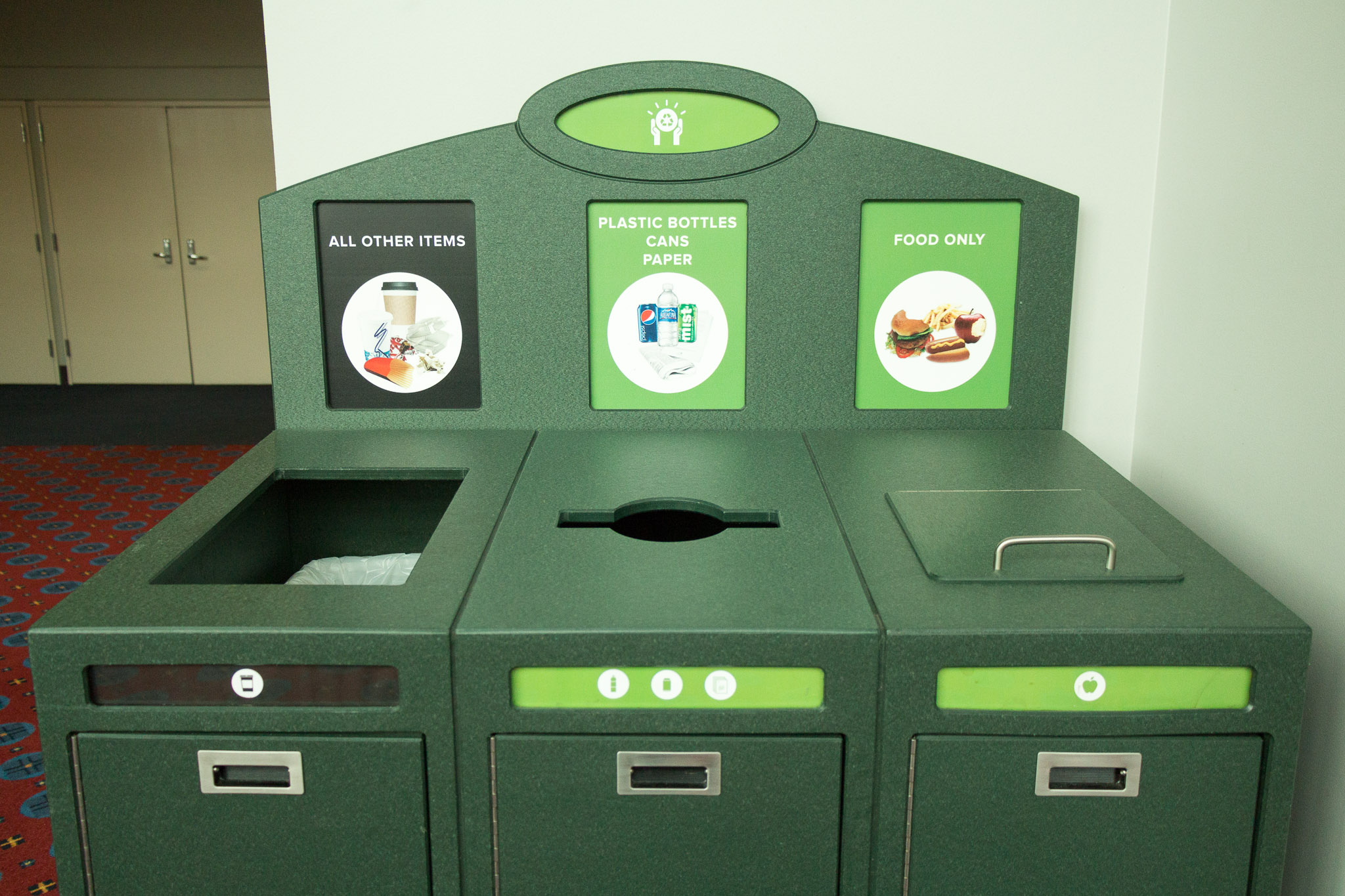
Recycling and waste management at the Oregon Convention Center, 2017

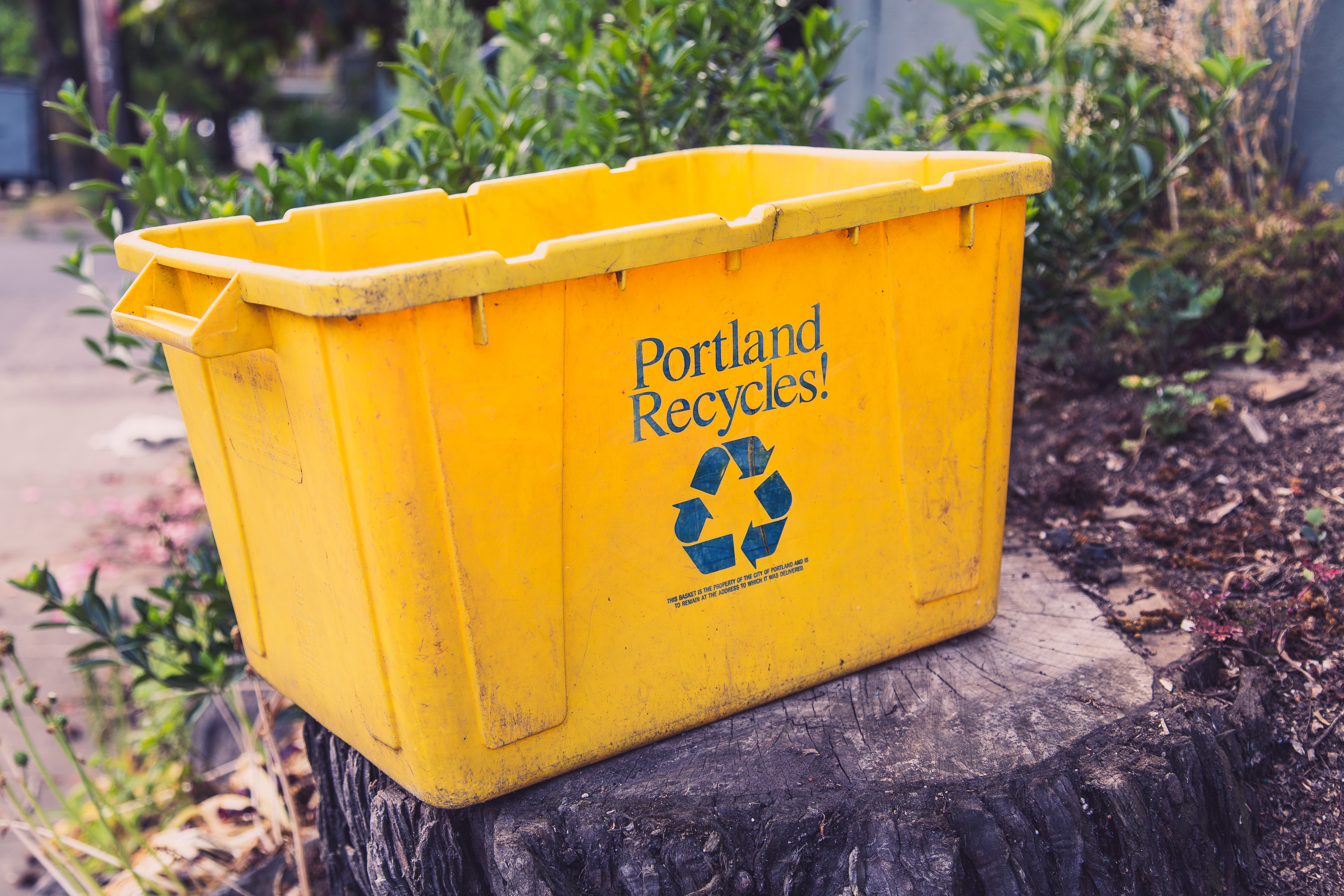
Recycling bin in Portland, 2015

The City of Portland has a Sustainability and Climate Commission and Multnomah County has an Office of Sustainability. In 2023, Portland City Council approved a five-year, $750 million plan focused on climate action and environmental justice. The Portland Clean Energy Fund's (PCEF) Climate Investment Plan seeks to "reduce carbon emissions and ensure residents are better prepared for climate change, with a focus on helping communities of color and low-income residents". According to Oregon Public Broadcasting (OPB), "The climate justice program will fund a wide variety of projects from renewable energy and energy efficiency upgrades to lowering greenhouse gas emissions from the transportation sector by encouraging electric vehicle purchases over the next five years." In 2023, OPB said of the PCEF: "Last year, the fund experienced a series of setbacks, including an unfavorable audit, in which auditors found the clean energy fund lacked oversight and accountability. The [PCEF] raises money from a tax on large retailers, and has so far raised much more money than initially expected when voters passed the tax in 2018." In 2026, the city launched the Recycling Quality Improvement Pilot Project is reduce recycling mistakes.

The city has had a chief sustainability officer. The Portland Bureau of Planning and Sustainability (BPS), which The Oregonian says "manages a wide array of city functions, from land use planning and zoning to residential and commercial trash collection", has proposed a tax on smokestack emissions and offers a battery recycling service.

During his tenure as mayor, Sam Adams vowed to make Portland "the most sustainable city in the world".

The Moda Center, which is owned by the city, has started serving drinks in reusable cups.

== Studies and rankings ==
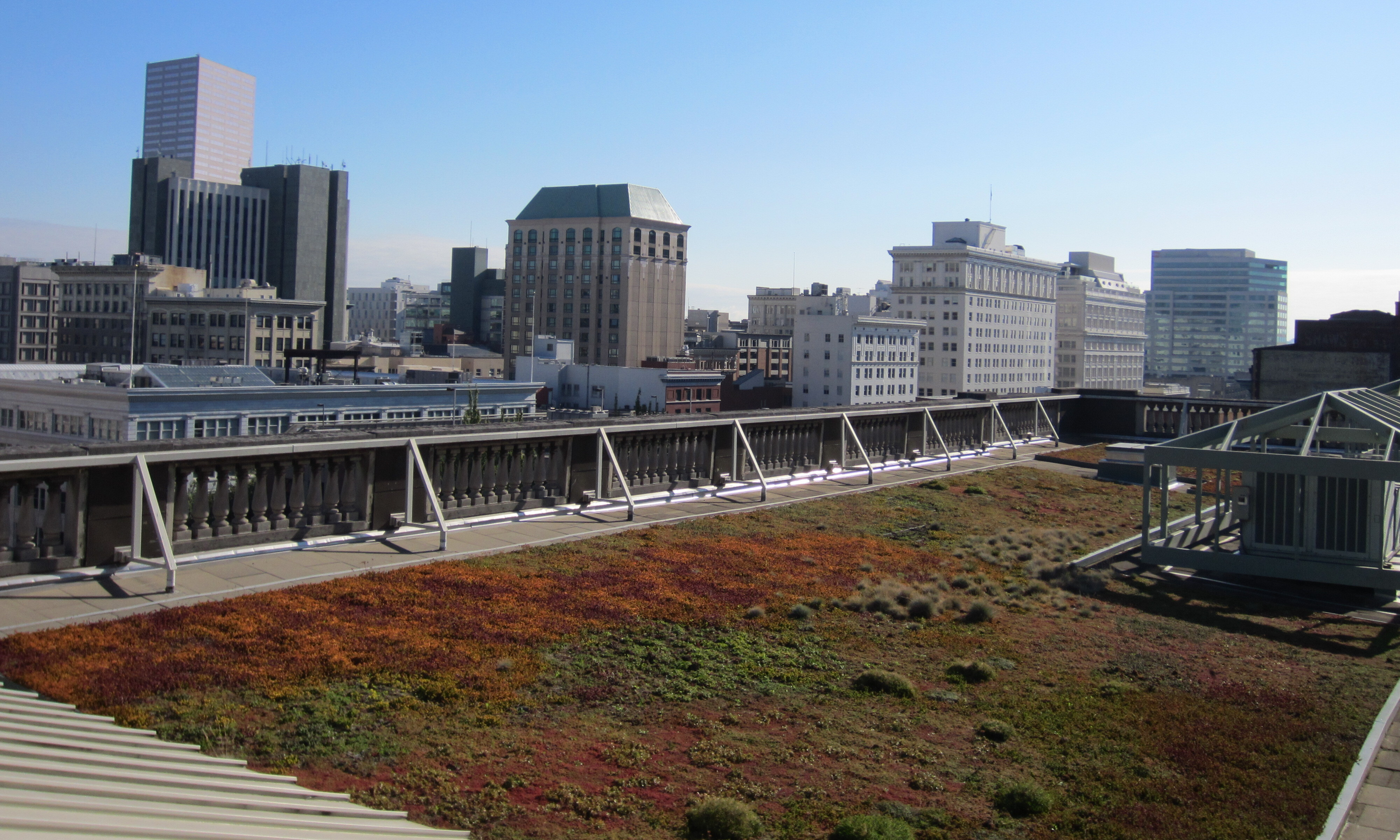
Green roof, Central Library, Portland, Oregon, 2012

In 2019, a study ranked Portland tenth in a list of American cities "making the most progress toward sustainability". According to KATU, "Portland scored high marks for its ratings given by the ACEEE and its reduction in energy-related CO2 emissions." In 2022, a study commissioned by a travel blog deemed Portland the most sustainable city in the nation. According to KPTV, "Portland consistently ranks high on lists of the greenest cities in the United States and was one of the first to present a thorough strategy to address CO2 emissions."

Another study in 2024 named Portland the "greenest" city in the U.S., also ranking tenth in the sustainability category. According to CNBC, "Portland is actively working on achieving a net-zero carbon emissions goal by 2050 and uses wind and other forms of renewable energy to help keep the city running. Over one-third of Portland's 2,500 miles of sewer pipes are more than 80 years old, so the city uses green infrastructure to protect the aging sewer system, according to Portland's Environmental Services. The city uses green streets, eco-roofs, trees and more to manage the stormwater."

== Sustainable architecture and businesses ==
In 2024, the PAE Living Building in the Old Town Chinatown neighborhood was named one of the most sustainable buildings in the world. A company operating within the building creates fertilizer from collected rainwater, solar energy, and waste. The renovated Portland International Airport was built with sustainable timber.

Portland-based Columbia Sportswear makes sustainable fashion using recycled materials. In 2023, the University of Oregon announced a new sustainable textile facility near its campus in northeast Portland.

== See also ==
- Earth Day in Portland, Oregon
