= Red House eviction defense =

2020 site of eviction protest in Portland, Oregon, US

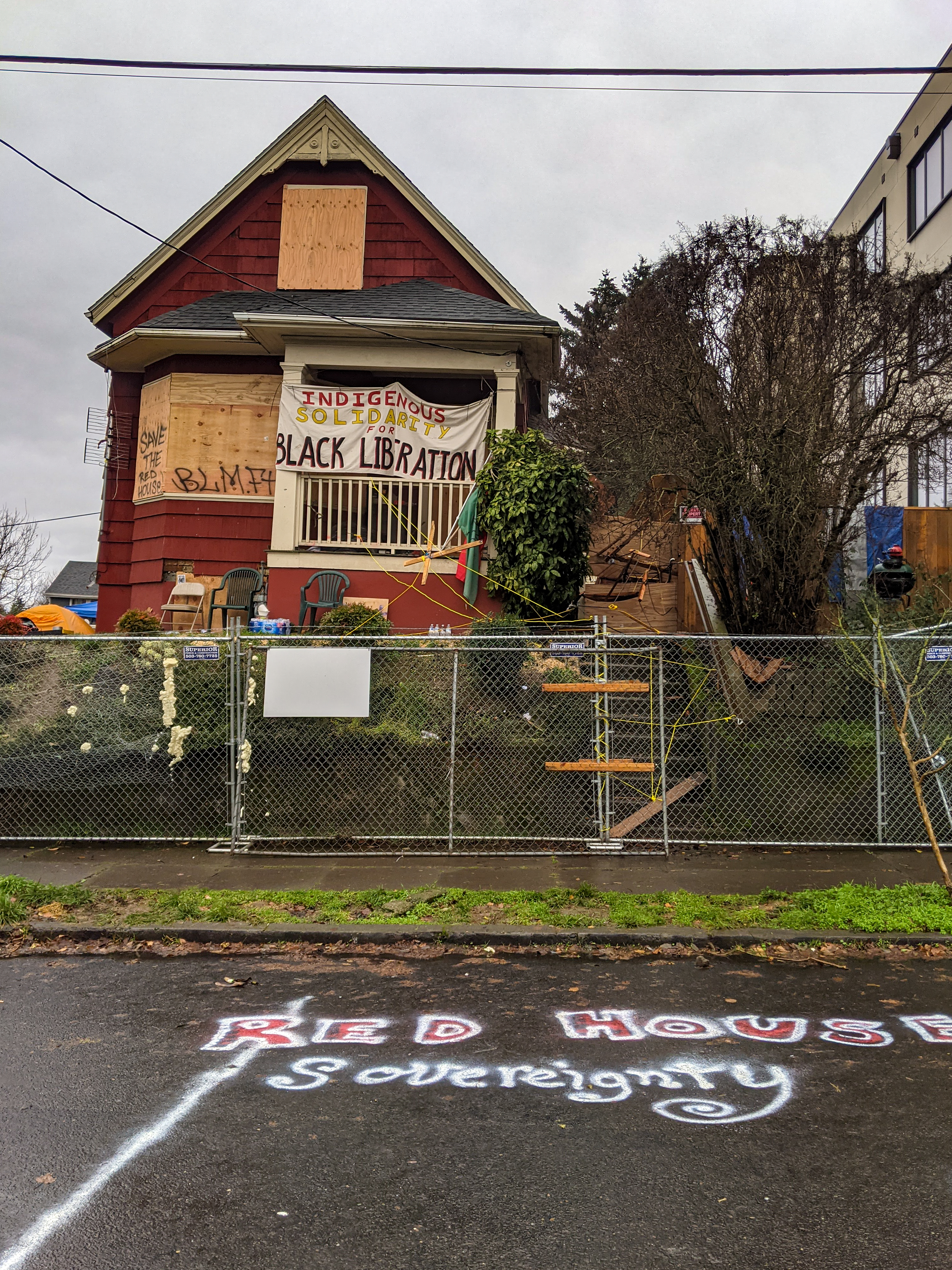
- The Red House, pictured on December 13, 2020
- Date: September–December 2020
- Location: 4406 North Mississippi Avenue,Portland, Oregon, U.S. 45°33′20″N 122°40′31″W
- Caused by: Eviction of the Kinney family

The Red House eviction defense was an occupation protest at a foreclosed house on North Mississippi Avenue in the Humboldt neighborhood in the Albina district, a historically Black district of Portland, Oregon, United States.

The Kinneys, a Black and Indigenous family, owned the house, often called the "Red House," for 65 years. They took out a mortgage on the house in the early 2000s, but the loan went into default in 2016. In 2018 the family lost the home in a non-judicial foreclosure proceeding, but continued to live there. William Kinney III (also known as William X. Nietzsche) relied upon sovereign citizen ideas when arguing that state and federal laws do not have jurisdiction over the family and their debts.

In September 2020, Multnomah County Sheriff's Deputies served a court order at the home and evicted the Kinneys. Activists rose in support of the family and occupied the property and the surrounding area.

In December 2020, law enforcement officers returned, removing some activists and arresting several people. Activists then barricaded the area surrounding the house. Police and demonstrators clashed as police tried to clear demonstrators from the area.

On December 11, the Kinney family and city officials reached an agreement, barricades were removed, and reports circulated that the developer might return the house to the Kinneys at cost. However, upon receiving the funds from a crowdfunding campaign started to assist with repurchase, the family stated they would weigh their options regarding whether or not to repurchase the house.

== History and context ==
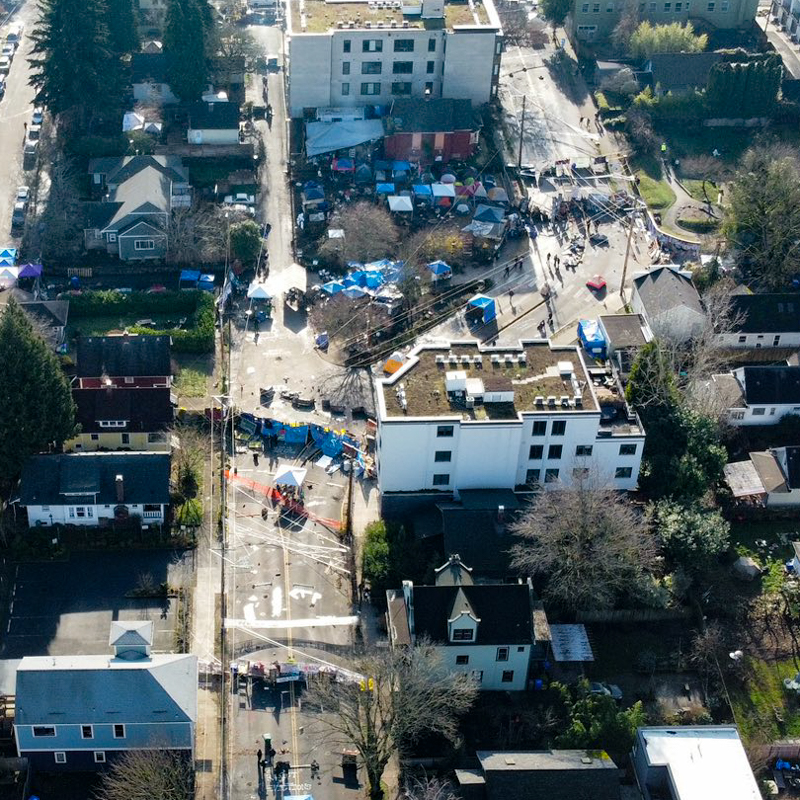
Overhead view of the Red House and its surroundings on December 12

Pauline and William Kinney sold the Red House to William Kinney, Jr. and his wife, who is Upper Skagit, in 1995. In the early 2000s, the younger Kinney family mortgaged their home, which had by that time been in their family for 65 years, in order to pay legal fees after their son William Kinney III (William X. Nietzche), then age 17, was found guilty of killing a man and injuring his wife in 2002 while without a valid driver's license. The mortgage was from Freedom Mortgage Corporation in May 2002. In March 2004, they refinanced that loan with Beneficial Oregon Incorporated.

In December 2016 the loan was transferred to another company. According to a website created by supporters of the Kinney family, the family began receiving bills from both the previous mortgage company and the new one, and so began putting payments into an escrow account instead of paying the bills so the billing issue could be resolved. However, according to reports by The Oregonian, "it’s not clear if that account was ever set up," and the Kinney family missed 17 payments for over a year. Multiple communications were made between the Kinney family and lenders during this period which questioned the lenders' jurisdiction, with rhetoric "consistent with the so-called sovereign citizen movement". The Kinneys would mark forms "void" and return them, and claimed that "the company had no jurisdiction".

William Kinney III and his mother have stated in court filings and on social media that the law and the courts do not have jurisdiction over them. J.J. MacNab, a research fellow at the George Washington University's Program on Extremism, said that their rhetoric was similar to that of Ammon Bundy in his occupation of the Malheur National Wildlife Refuge, and that they appeared to be adherents of Moorish sovereign citizen ideas. The Kinneys' social media posts have also referred to QAnon and other right-wing conspiracy theories.

The Kinneys owed $97,000 in 2018 when the house was put into foreclosure and purchased by a developer for $260,000. The family states it has had trouble finding an attorney who would take their cases, often needing to be represented by their son, William Kinney III. According to reporting from Oregon Public Broadcasting, legal experts believe if the Kinney family had adequate legal representation in 2016, they likely could have avoided the foreclosure. The same reporting emphasizes the significance of the non-judicial foreclosure process, which lacks many of the legal protections that would have been in play if a judge had overseen the foreclosure proceeding.

William Kinney III frequently spoke out about the situation on social media. The Kinneys have alleged that the mortgage lender and an investment company deliberately tried to remove the Kinneys from the house in order to redevelop the land. Portland Mayor Ted Wheeler took a different view, writing on Twitter, "There was a lengthy, thorough judicial proceeding resulting in a lawful judge's order to evict people illegally occupying a home."

The home has been the subject of legal conflicts and political actions ever since the foreclosure. In September 2020 the family petitioned a judge to be allowed to stay in their home, pointing to Oregon's moratorium on evictions that had been implemented due to the COVID-19 pandemic. The courts have allowed the eviction to go ahead on the basis that the foreclosure was in 2018, prior to the pandemic. Protestors have argued that an eviction during a pandemic is cruel nonetheless. The Kinneys began staying in hotels and with friends, and eventually in a North Portland home owned by the elder Kinneys since 1966.

After the event, OPB author Jonathan Levinson apologized and defended the "second home" story, stating it should have been reported with more context, compassion, and nuance. Ultimately Levinson defended the story as completing the Kinneys' narrative.

William Kinney III described the home as "unceded territory." He said gentrification is just a different word for a familiar pattern of displacement. "It's the same scheme—different word, different day." “It’s a fight against systemic racism and gentrification that’s been going on for years,” he said, and added: “My family comes from this land and to see it taken without right and by gunpoint… It’s outrageous to me.”

== Demonstration ==
=== Initial eviction and community response ===
In early September 2020, Multnomah County sheriffs forcibly evicted the Kinney family. Members of the community rose in support of the family.

From September into December 2020, activists, including those who protested against systemic racism as part of the Black Lives Matter movement, gathered at the home to protest the eviction of "a Black and Indigenous family that has lived there for over six decades and as a stand against further gentrification of the city's historically Black Albina neighborhood". The house has become known as the "Red House on Mississippi", or simply the "Red House". Predatory lending and the criminal history of the family's son have been cited as reasons for financial difficulties leading to the foreclosure. The home was purchased at auction by Urban Housing Development LLC in 2018; the family disputes the new ownership of the house. A judge ordered the family to be evicted in September 2020. The family filed a federal lawsuit attempting to overturn the eviction.

The sheriff's department stated that protestors were "camping on adjacent privately owned and city-owned properties", and that 81 calls for service were made between September 1 and November 30, because of fights, shots fired, burglary, thefts, vandalism, noise violations and threats by armed individuals.

=== December 2020 escalation ===
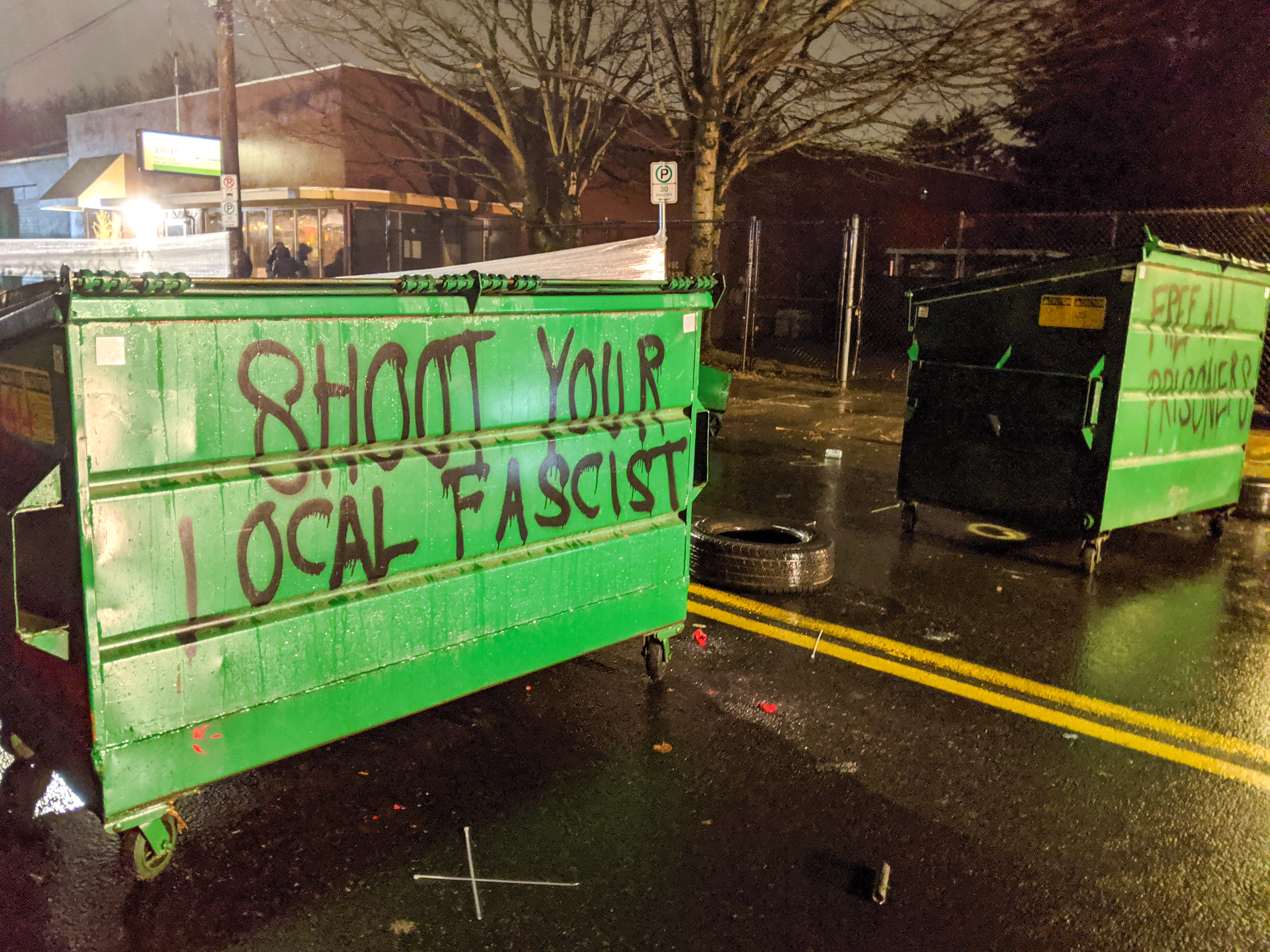
Graffitied dumpsters near the site of the occupation on December 8, 2020

Around 5 a.m. on December 8, 2020, the Portland Police Bureau and Multnomah County Sheriff's Office arrived to evict residents, clear property, and render the house uninhabitable. They evicted the residents and arrested seven people with a small number of protesters present. The police left while anti-eviction activists threw rocks and paint balloons. Police returned to supervise the erection of a construction fence around the house, and protesters repelled the police around 10:30 a.m. Several police cars were damaged and had their tires deflated, and an officer drove into a parked car while retreating.

Over the course of the day, an estimated 200 activists reoccupied the property and constructed barricades to block all access to the house. Protesters sealed off the intersection of North Mississippi Ave and North Albina Ave to the north of the house, as well as the surrounding entrances from North Skidmore Street and North Prescott Street. They also positioned guards at the entrances to the barricaded area.

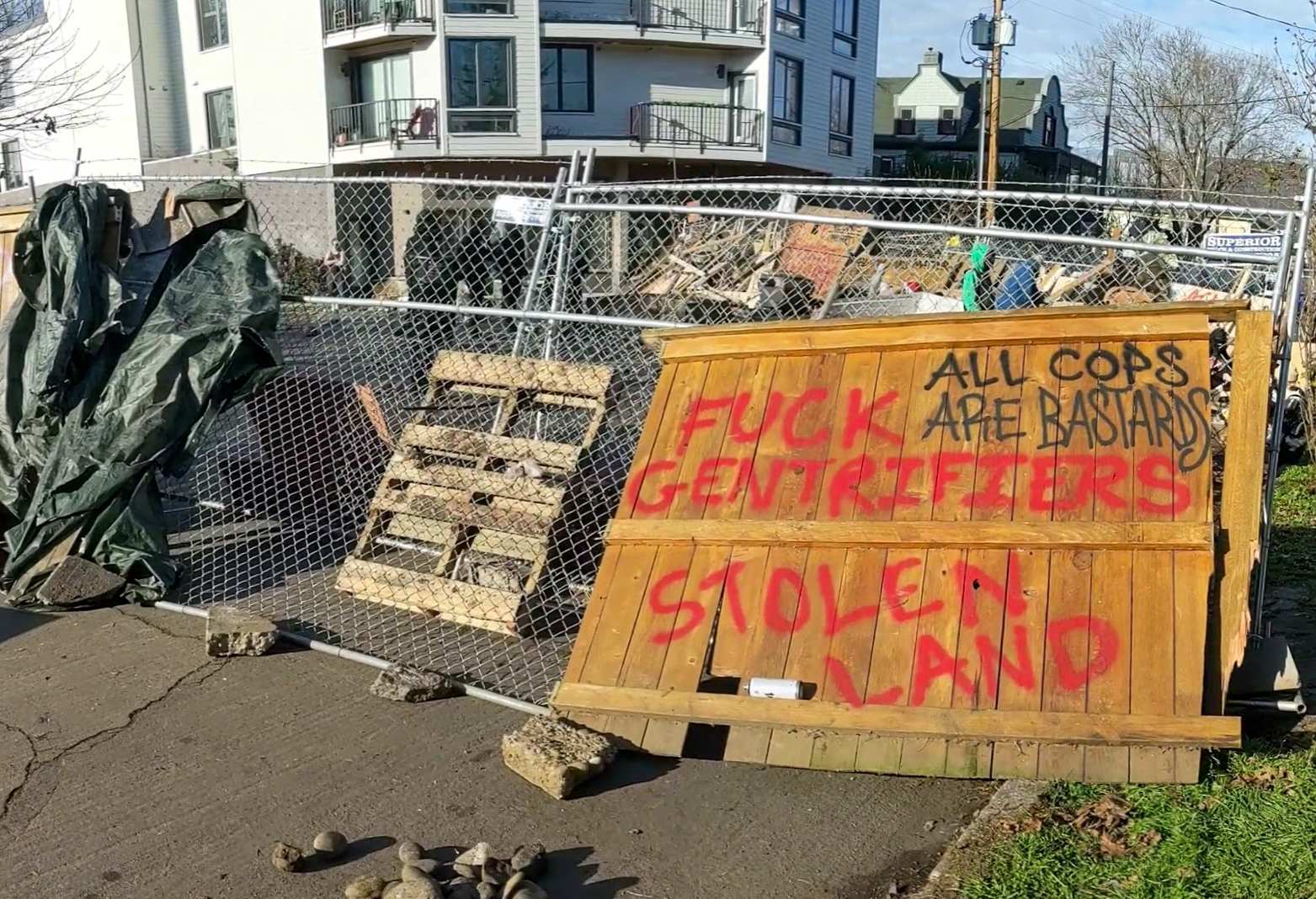
Part of a barricade near the Red House on December 8, 2020

Later on December 8, Mayor Ted Wheeler authorized the Portland Police Bureau to "use all lawful means to end the illegal occupation" and said, "there will be no autonomous zone in Portland. It's time for the encampment and occupation to end. There are many ways to protest and work toward needed reform. Illegally occupying private property, openly carrying weapons, threatening and intimidating people are not among them." Supporters said that Wheeler and Lovell's statements seek to "criminalize the right of Afro-Indigenous people to bear arms". They additionally alleged that law enforcement was applying Oregon gun laws more aggressively against Black and Indigenous people of color (BIPOC), stating "We are threatened upon speculation, while known white supremacists continue to brandish arms without consequence." KGW quoted a representative from Community Alliance of Tenants in their coverage: "This is not a story of an autonomous zone. This is a story of systemic oppression."

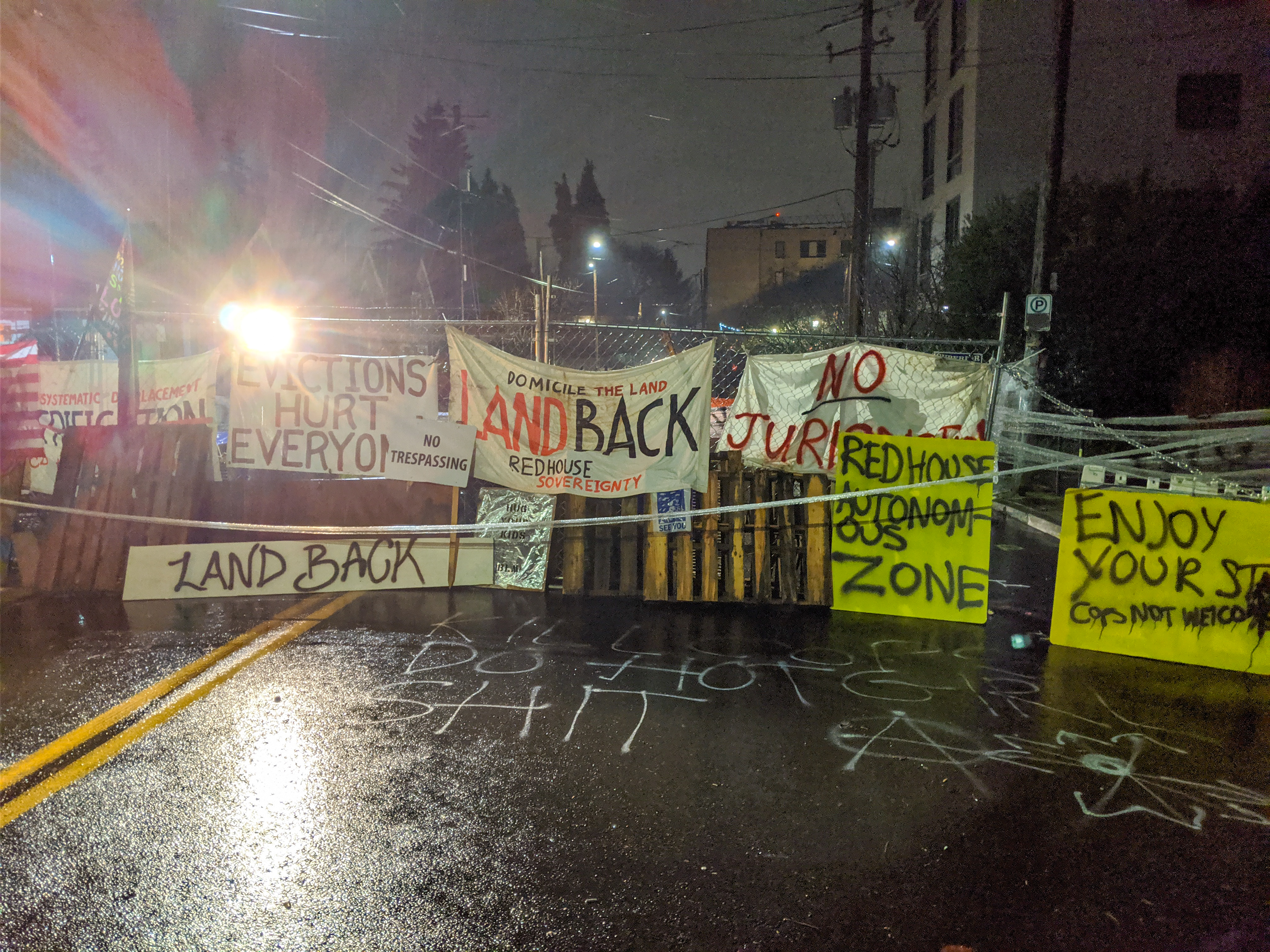
Barricade at Red House eviction defense on December 8, 2020

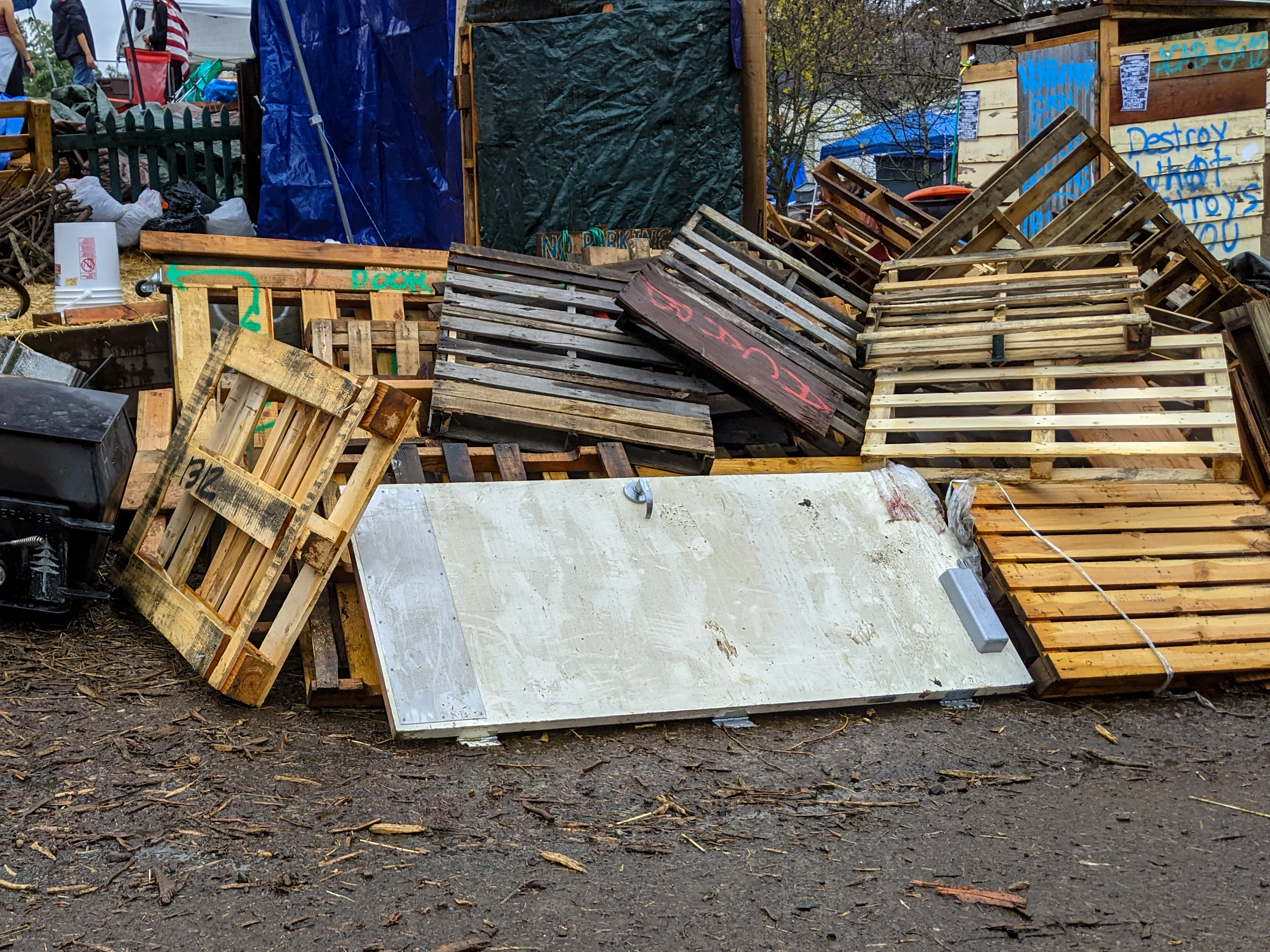
Barricade materials on December 13

On December 9, The Oregonian reported that guards, at least one of whom was armed, remained posted at each intersection blocked by protesters, and that spike strips made of boards and nails were outside one of the barricades. Willamette Week later described the guard as being part of "several physical barricades of protection and layers of guards... to make people of color feel safe standing around a fire pit" at the center of the space. That same day, the Portland Police Bureau spoke to the illegality of the occupation and the possibility of violence on the site. Describing this, the Portland Mercury stated that "the police continued spinning fear-mongering disinformation about the occupation". On December 10, Oregon Public Broadcasting reported that protestors were forbidding photography or video recording within the occupied zone. Most such confrontations were verbal, though that policy was reportedly at times enforced through physical violence.

That same day, a co-owner of Urban Housing Development LLC offered to sell the property to the family for the price he paid at the foreclosure sale in 2018. In addition to stating "We're overwhelmed by the attention to this," he expressed fear for his family's safety. The co-owner was described as a house flipper and investor.

On December 11, district attorney Mike Schmidt praised "the neighbors and community members who have refused to stand by silently" and who spoke out about what was happening, but stated that some neighbors were scared to leave their homes and that "continued violence, property damage, and harm to our community is inexcusable and will be met with aggressive prosecution."

=== December 2020 deescalation ===
The director of the Coalition to Save Portland visited the Red House on December 11, and reported, among other things, that the Kinney family wanted a letter offering assurances that people would not be arrested or prosecuted if they worked to take down barriers. That same day, a GoFundMe fundraising campaign to help the Kinney family repurchase their house surpassed $260,000, approximately the amount the developer paid for it in 2018. By the 14th, the campaign surpassed $300,000.

Two days later, the Kinney family reached a tentative deal with the City of Portland which would prevent their eviction as long as barricades came down in the neighborhood. The announcement was accompanied by an apology from the mayor and police chief for their tweets; this apology explained that by referring to the protest as an attempted "autonomous zone" and issuing threats to the protesters, they had escalated the situation, which caused threats to the family.

The Kinney family echoed that sentiment in their statement, as did City Council member Jo Ann Hardesty and local news outlets. In a press conference the following day, Mayor Wheeler expressed "disgust" at the idea that his statements constituted a "win" for protesters, saying that "we are talking about safety. And if you think that negotiating at the head of a gun is a win, you need to reevaluate." He added that "nobody should take this as an invitation to do it anywhere else. The end result could turn out very differently."

Wheeler also announced that the Kinney family and the developer had reached a "tentative" deal, but later retracted the claim.

Following those announcements by the mayor and police chief, activists requested assistance in removing the barriers. By December 14, they were fully removed and traffic along Mississippi and Albina avenues was restored.

Willamette Week stated "if the closure of a major city street caused any neighborhood resentment, it hasn't been apparent", describing how a local coffee shop, open during the defense, allowed activists to use their bathroom and that neighbors frequently purchased coffee for the activists. Residents also supplied material to build the barricade. On December 17, KATU reported that protestors were no longer blocking the street, but that some remained encamped at the house and on a neighboring lot. They stated that some neighbors were afraid to speak publicly and that these neighbors claimed some protestors were still engaging in intimidating behavior.

=== Later events ===
As of February 20, 2021, people — many of them homeless — remained encamped on the property and an adjacent empty lot. Neighbors and local residents complained of harassment, vandalism, and personal threats by occupiers; some emailed the city government asking that the area be cleared. The family raised at least $315,000 through GoFundMe; the Kinneys received the money but it is unclear what happened to it thereafter.

On November 15, 2023, the property's title was transferred to "Kinney Ross Metcalf Enick International" trust for the sum of $345,000.

In August 2026, William Kinney III was arrested after reportedly harassing and threatening to shoot employees and contractors building affordable housing on the neighboring property. During the search, officers discovered several weapons and body armor. Kinney was charged with several counts of being a felon in possession of a firearm. Self Enhancement Inc., the nonprofit developer of the adjoining property, also obtained a temporary restraining order and then a preliminary injunction against Kinney.

== See also ==
- 2020–2021 United States racial unrest
- Black Lives Matter art in Portland, Oregon
- Capitol Hill Occupied Protest
- Dignity Village, a 20-year-old autonomous tent city in Portland
- George Floyd protests in Portland, Oregon
- Institutional racism in housing and lending
