= Albina Yard =

Rail yard in Portland, Oregon, U.S.

Coordinates: 45°32′54″N 122°41′19″W

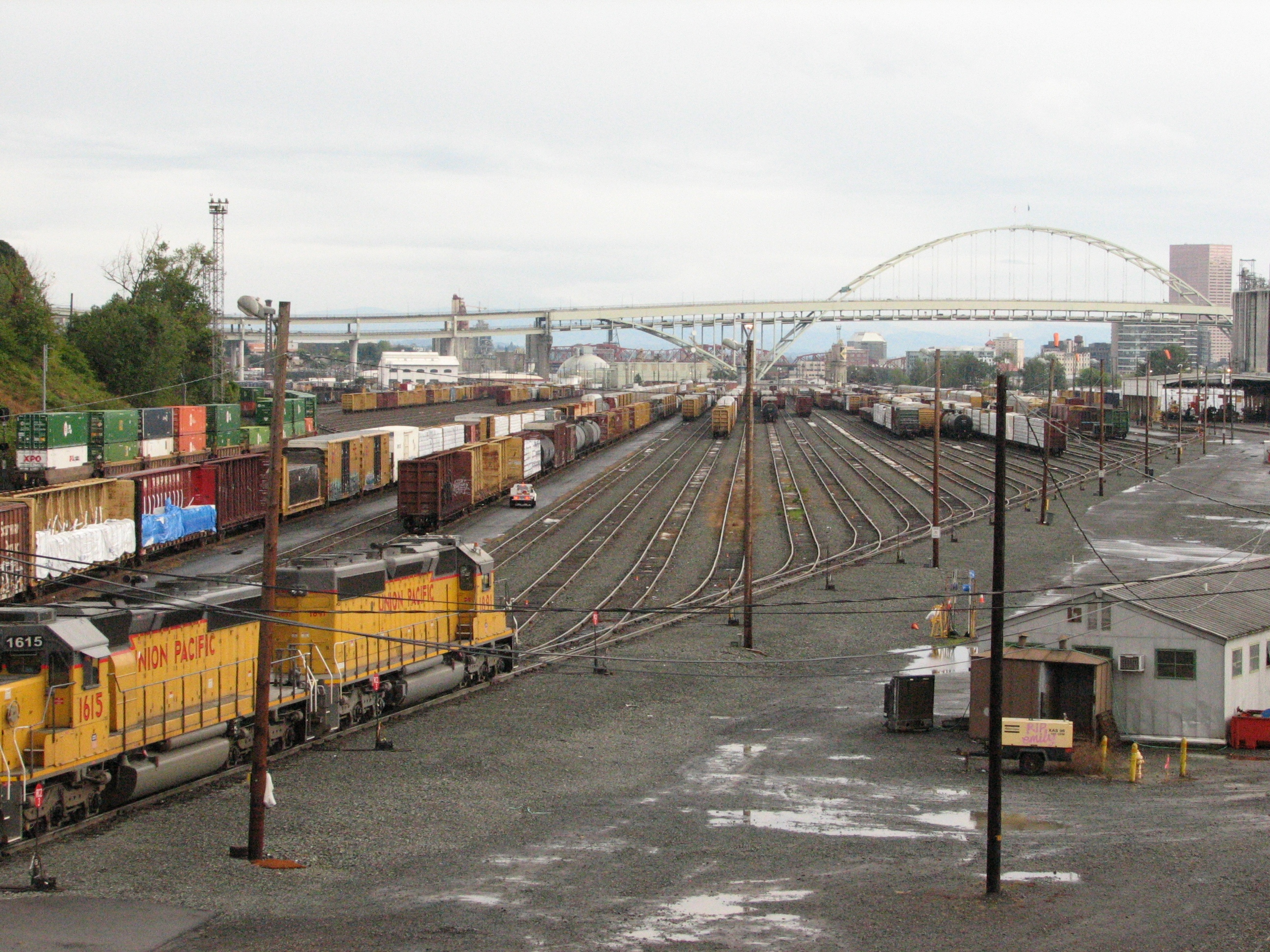
- Albina Yard as seen from the far north end

Overview
- Locale: Portland, Oregon

Service
- Type: Rail yard
- Operator(s): Union Pacific Railroad

Technical
- Track gauge: 4 ft 8 1/2 in (1,435 mm)

The Albina Yard is a 200-acre (81 ha) rail yard located in the Albina District of Portland, Oregon, currently operated by the Union Pacific Railroad. One of several yards operated by the Union Pacific Railroad in Portland, as of year 2000 the Albina yard processes an average of 1,200 rail cars a day.

The south end of the train yard features a distinctive brick smokestack that is easily visible when passing over the Fremont Bridge. Originally built in 1887 for Northern Pacific Terminal Company, the smokestack was refurbished in 2008 along with the addition of night lighting.

In 2009, the 50-year-old Union Pacific building adjacent to the yard was dismantled. In 2019, a Union Pacific train derailed in the yard and cracked a support beam of the Going Street bridge overpass.
