= Nossa Familia Coffee =

American coffee company

- Founded: 2004; 22 years ago
- Headquarters: Portland, Oregon
- Area served: United States
- Key people: Augusto Carneiro
- Products: Coffee
- Website: www.nossacoffee.com

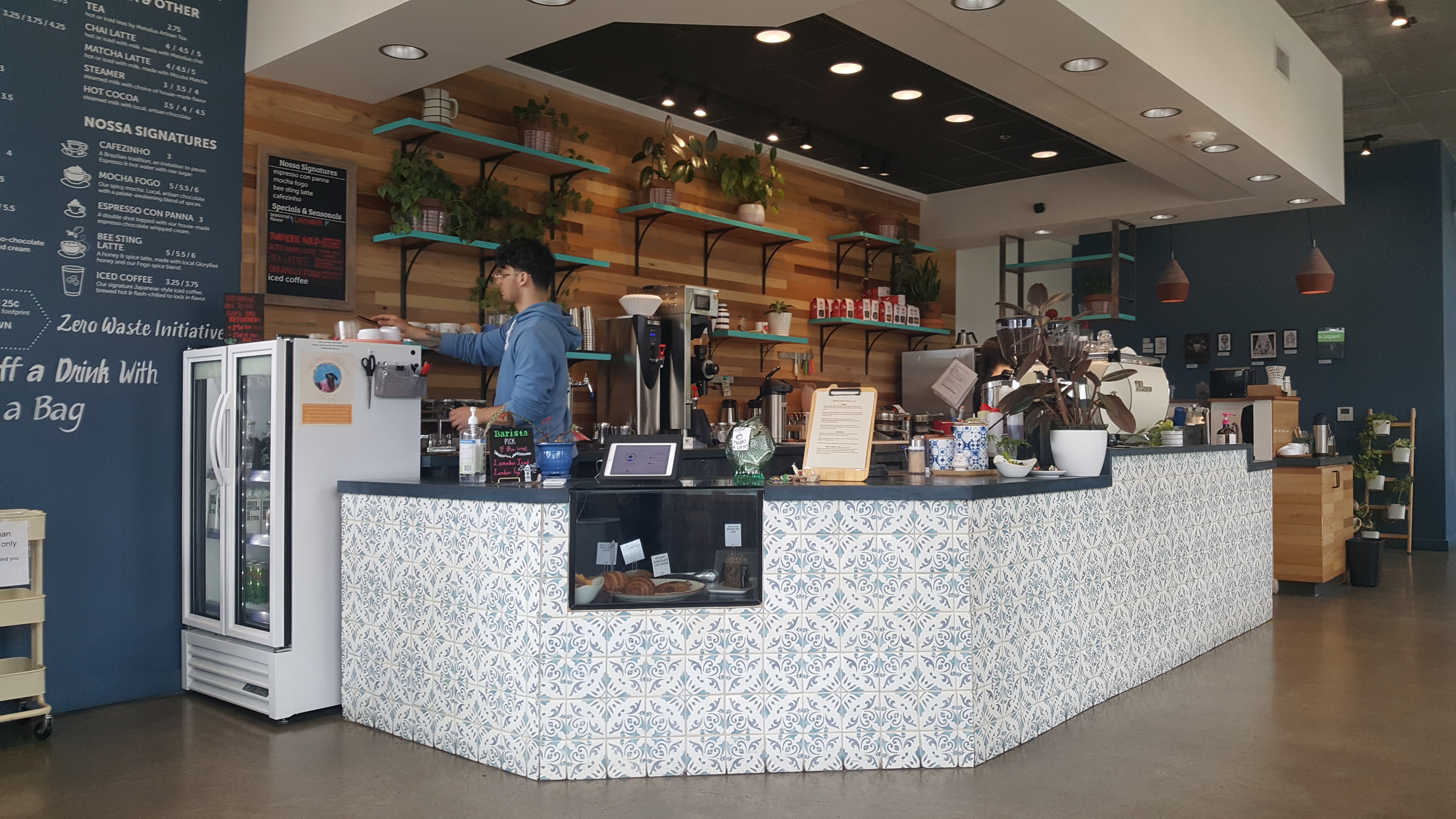
Interior of cafe in southeast Portland, Oregon, 2022

Nossa Familia Coffee is a coffee company based in Portland, Oregon. The roaster was founded by Augusto Carneiro in 2004 and uses sustainably sourced beans imported from Africa as well as Central and South America.

== Description and history ==
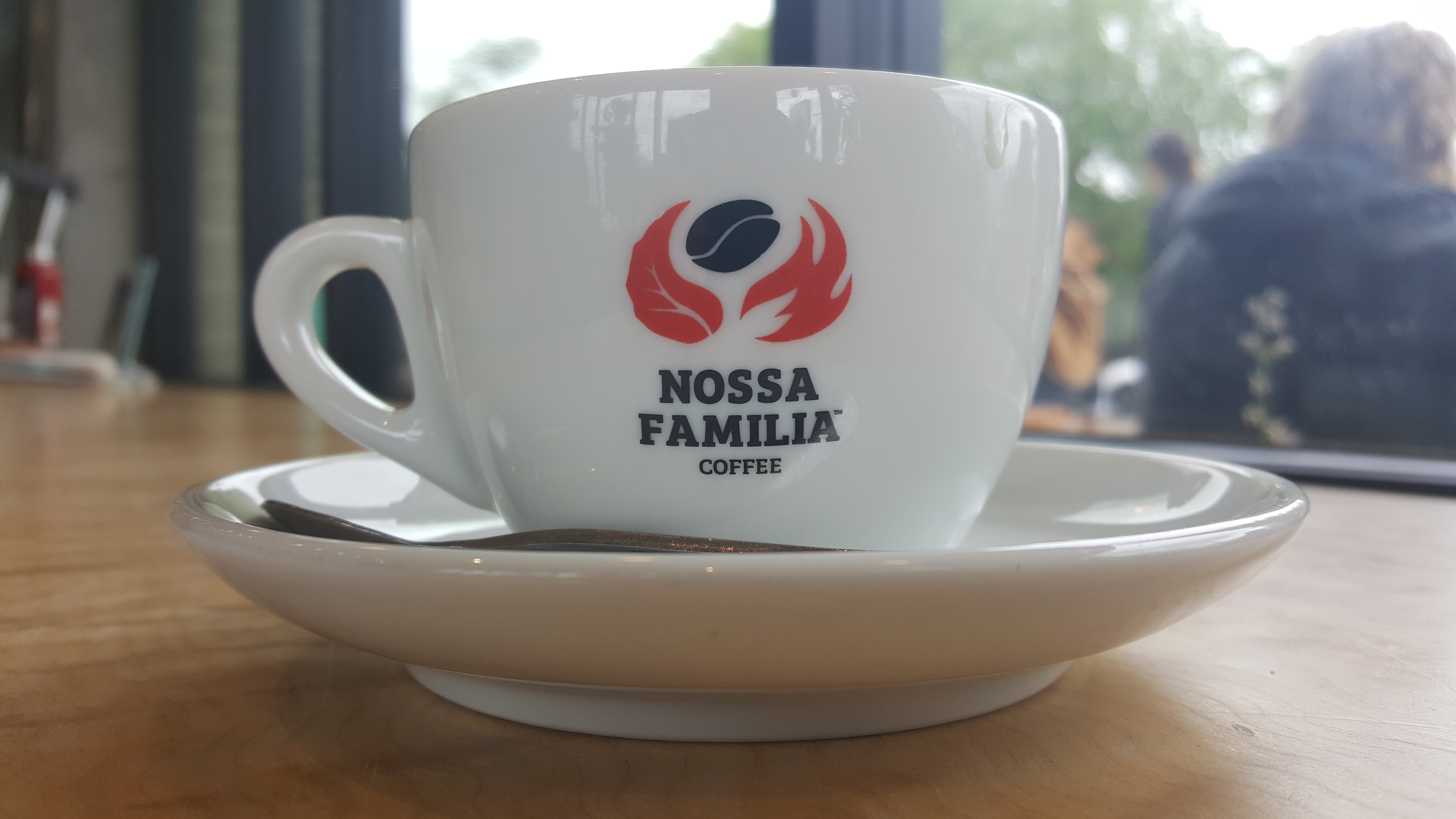
Cup of coffee

Nossa Familia ("Our Family" in Portuguese) was founded by Augusto Carvalho Dias Carneiro.

In 2017, the business confirmed plans to close the warehouse roasting facility and Espresso Bar in northwest Portland and open four cafes:

- Nossa Familia's Guatemala Cafe in southeast Portland
- Nossa Familia's Brazil Cafe in southeast Portland
- Nossa Familia's Cloudforest Espresso Bar in northwest Portland
- Nossa Familia's CalEdison Espresso Bar in Los Angeles, California

In 2019, Nossa Familia became "the first Portland coffee shop to add a 25-cent extra charge to orders served in disposable to-go cups". The company stopped operating for nearly two years because of the COVID-19 pandemic, reopening in January 2022.

== Reception ==
Seiji Nanbu included Nossa Familia in Eater Portland's 2020 overview of "Portland's go-to hot chocolates". The website's Katrina Yentch included the company in a 2021 list of "14 Distinctive Portland Cafés That Roast Their Own Coffee".

== See also ==
- List of coffeehouse chains
- List of restaurant chains in the United States
