= Earth Day in Portland, Oregon =

Earth Day is celebrated annually in the American city of Portland, Oregon. In 2018, Zoë Miller included Portland in Business Insider's list of seventeen "cities around the world that do Earth Day right". In 2024, Joseph Gallivan of Axios Portland said, "From student-led climate strikes to multi-use water bottles, the ideals of Earth Day have penetrated Portland culture." A photograph of Governor Tom McCall on the inaugural Earth Day in 1970 is part of the collection of the Oregon Historical Society.

== Events and activities ==
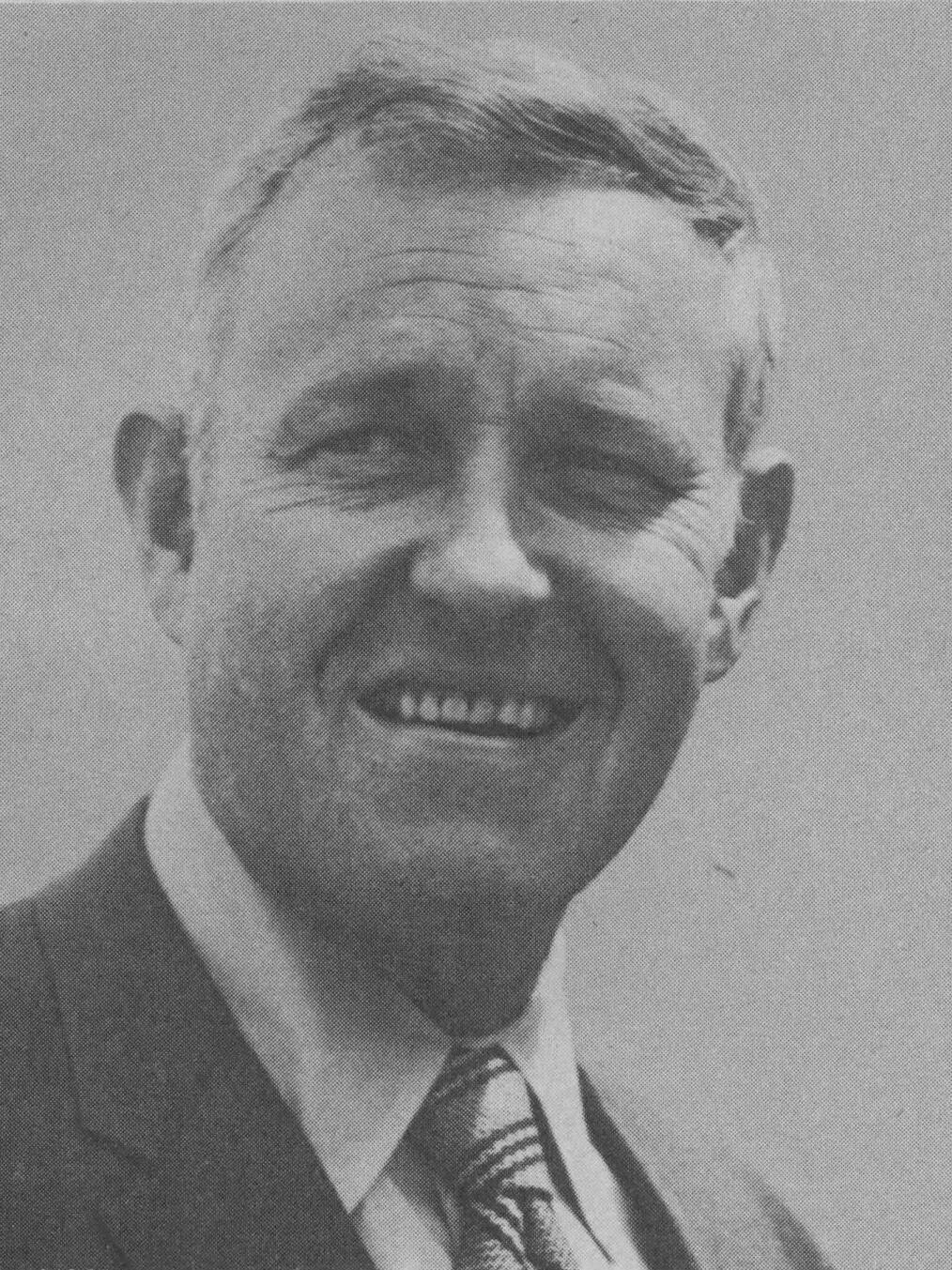
Governor Tom McCall (pictured in 1970) spoke at the city's first Earth Day celebration in 1970.

Earth Day activities in Portland include fundraisers, neighborhood clean-up efforts, plant sales and swaps, and street festivals. In 2010, Martin Patail of Portland Monthly described the first celebration in Portland in 1970, writing: "students across the city engage in weeklong programs to clean up our corner of Mother Earth, even going so far as to scrub Teddy's Rough Rider statue in the Park Blocks with soap and water. Governor McCall uses the day to rally opposition against the Army's nerve-gas storage." In his speech, McCall said, "If we are to succeed in saving our planet, the battle will be won or lost at the local level... Oregon is the key state in the domino structure of North America. If we fail, pollution marches on."

In 2020, during the COVID-19 pandemic, local artist Mike Bennett created Earth Day kits for people to paint spring-themed cartoon cutouts at home, in collaboration with Miller Paint. Other activities were organized online. Approximately 130 people cleaned Powell Park, in southeast Portland's Brooklyn neighborhood, with the help of a local radio station KFBW in 2023. In 2024, Portland Community College sponsored a week-long holiday fair with free bicycle repairs, gardening and terrarium lessons, upcycling workshops, and sustainability-related resources. A holiday celebration was also held in Multnomah Village.

Portland saw dozens of Earth Day activities organized in 2025, according to KGW. The Portland Bureau of Transportation (PBOT) hosted a "bike bus" with nine routes throughout the city. PBOT also offered free compost to residents. There was also Make Earth Cool, a family-friendly holiday celebration with a parade, a big brass band, and other activities. Willamette Week said, "If you're looking for a loud boisterous event with people dressed like daffodils wielding giant puppets of nature spirits, boy, do we have the event for you." The group also hosted the Earth Films for Earth Day festival at Tomorrow Theater.

In 2026, the city hosted its second annual Earth Day celebration at Parkrose Middle School. The free, family-friendly event was called "Earth in Motion" and focused on sustainability and transportation. It featured approximately 50 exhibitors, ranging from city programs and environmental organizations. It also unveiled a new Biketown station and included a bicycle ride with free helmets for participants.

=== Portland State University ===
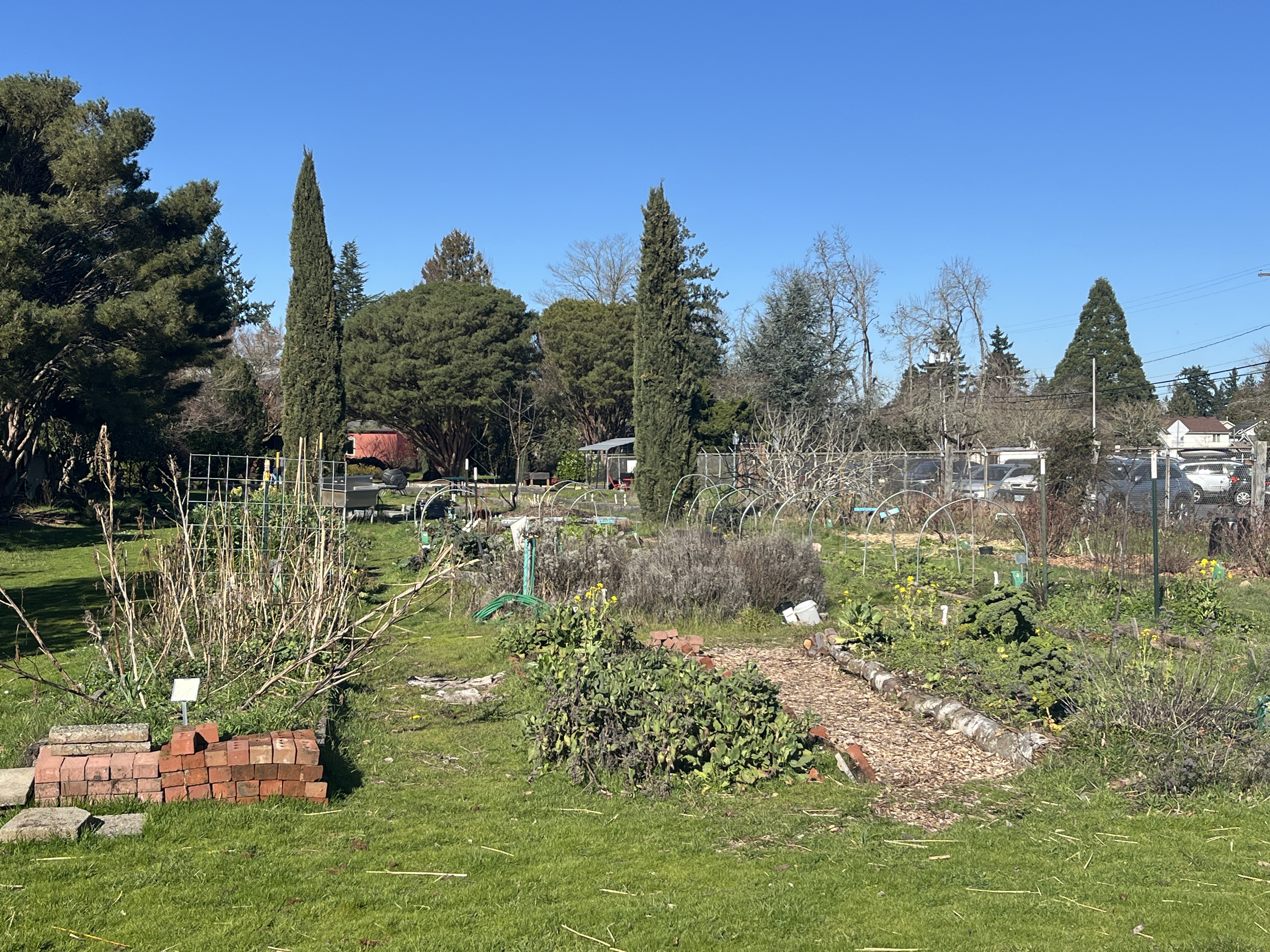
Portland State University's Learning Gardens Laboratory (pictured in 2026) hosts an Earth Day fair annually.

In 1970, Portland State University (PSU) commemorated the first Earth Day by dedicating eight pages in the yearbook to landscape photography for the "environment teach-in".

The university's fourth annual Earth Day Festival was held in the South Park Blocks in 2011. It featured food, music, and sustainable living demonstrations. The 2015 festival was hosted by PSU's Environmental Club at the same location. The event had a craft market, free food, a clothing swap, and live music.

PSU's Learning Gardens Laboratory hosts an Earth Day fair annually; the event has been held in southeast Portland's Brentwood-Darlington neighborhood. The 2015 and 2017 events were billed as the Earth Day Spring Festival; the festival was later called the Earth People's Fair, and later the Earth Day Fair.

=== Protests ===
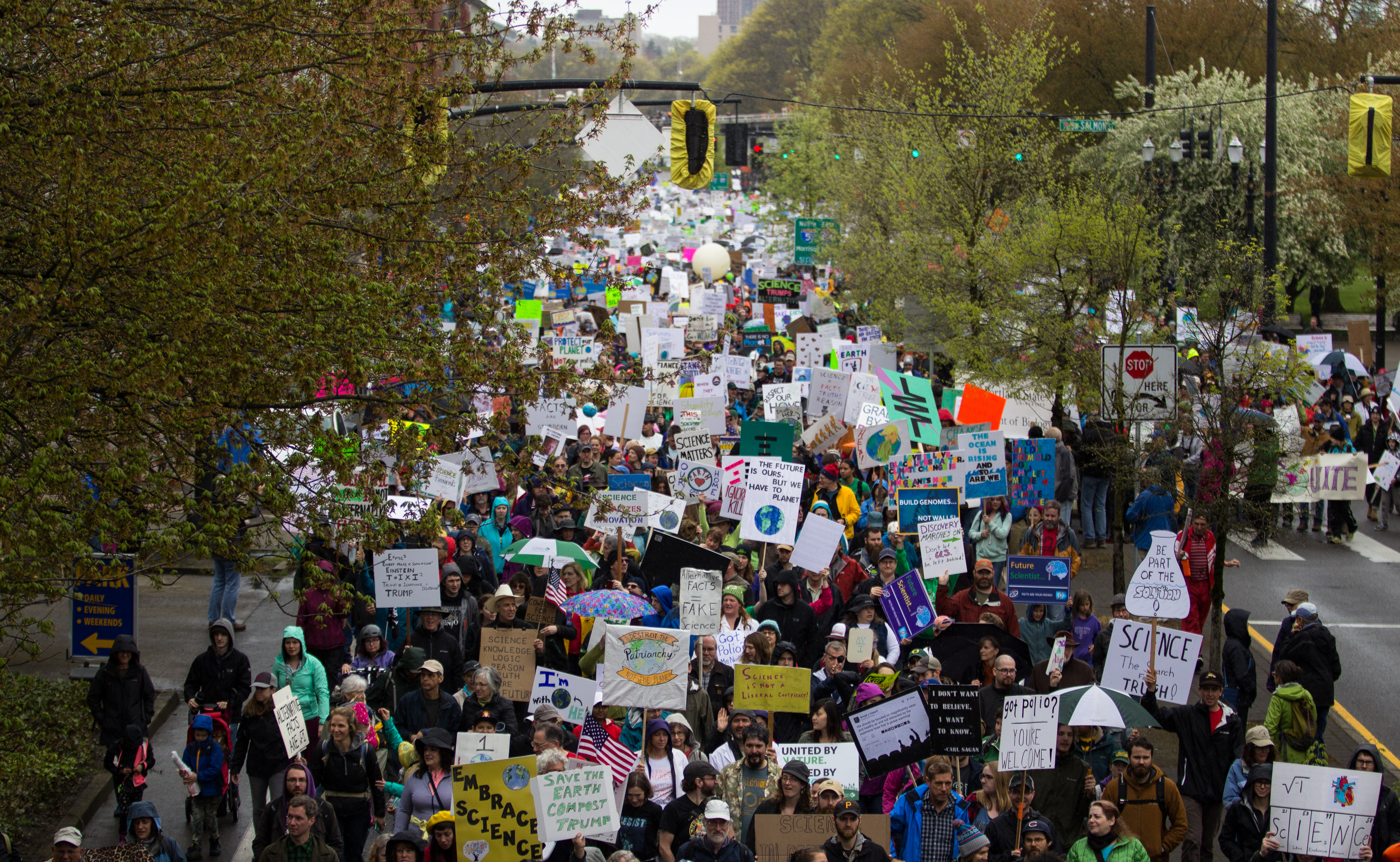
The March for Science Portland was held on Earth Day in 2017.

March for Science Portland was among 600 March for Science protests held on Earth Day in 2017; thousands of people attended the local demonstration. In 2019, eleven people were arrested on the holiday for sitting on railroad tracks to protest Zenith Energy's import of Alberta tar sands oil.

In 2025, approximately 100 students from multiple local high schools gathered at the Portland Youth Climate Strike outside of Portland City Hall, before marching to Pioneer Courthouse Square, to advocate for more aggressive policies to address climate change. Additionally, local organizers with Indivisible also hosted Earth Day Rally at Caruthers Park, in the South Waterfront district, to protest the Donald Trump administration's energy and environmental policies.

== See also ==
- Culture of Portland, Oregon
