= Albina Youth Opportunity School =

Location
- 3710 N. Mississippi Avenue; Portland, (Multnomah County), Oregon 97227; United States; 45.549882°N 122.675322°W

Information
- Opened: 1966
- Grades: 7-12
- Enrollment: 54
- Accreditation: NAAS

Albina Youth Opportunity School was an alternative high school in Portland, Oregon, United States.

The school has been accredited by the Northwest Association of Accredited Schools since 1993.
