= Billy Webb Elks Lodge =

Historic building in Portland, Oregon, U.S.

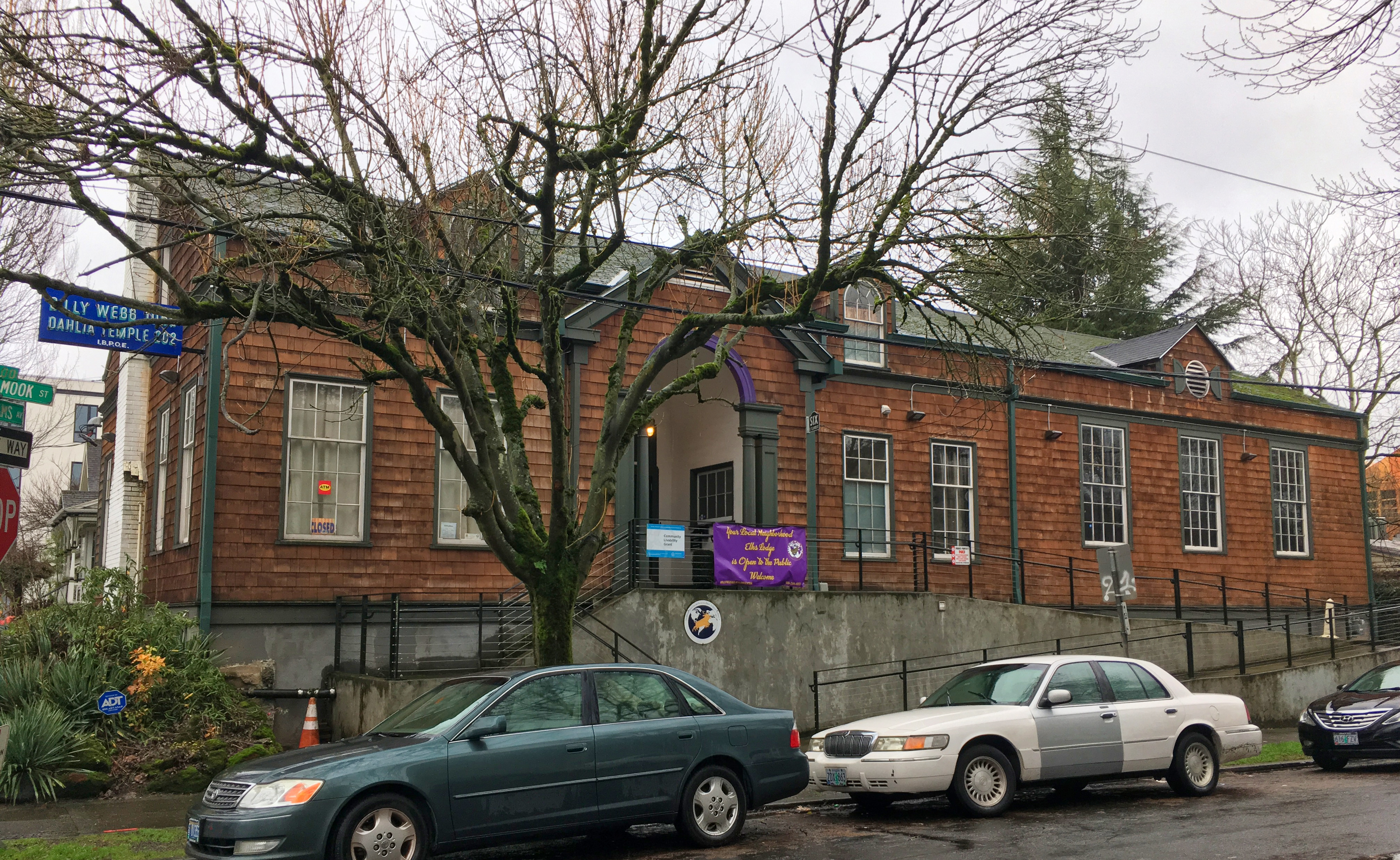
- The building's exterior in 2019
- Interactive map of the Billy Webb Elks Lodge area

General information
- Location: Portland, Oregon, United States
- Coordinates: 45°32′16.5″N 122°40′1.2″W

The Williams Avenue YWCA, also known as the Billy Webb Elks Lodge, is an historic building in north Portland, Oregon. Listed on the National Register of Historic Places in 2020, the structure was heavily damaged by fire in 2021.
