= Frederick Torgler Building =

Historic building in Portland, Oregon, U.S.

- U.S. National Register of Historic Places
- Portland Historic Landmark
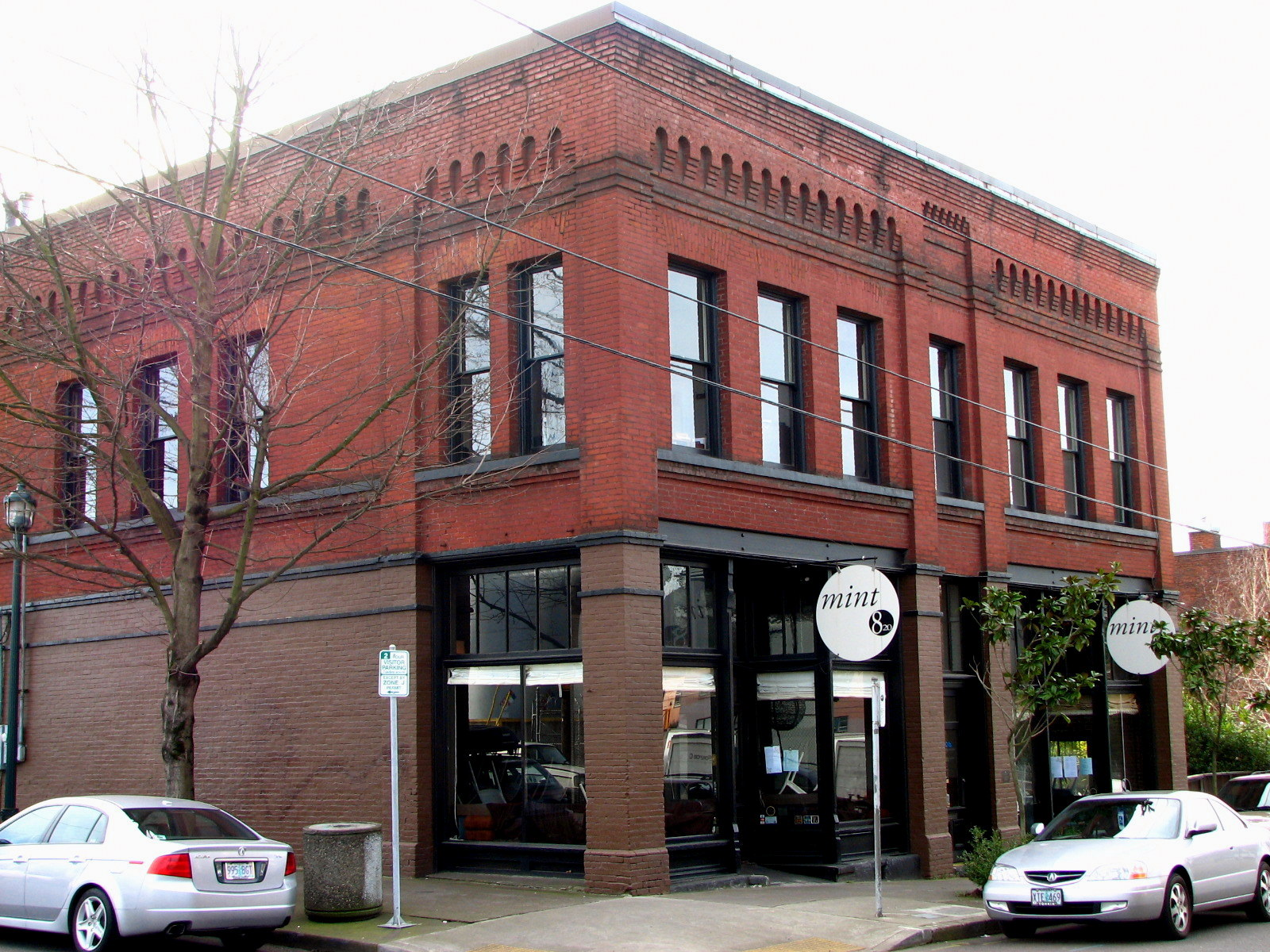
- Frederick Torgler Building in 2008

- Location within Portland, Oregon Location within Oregon Location within the United States
- Location: 816-820 N. Russell St., Portland, Oregon
- Coordinates: 45°32′27″N 122°40′30″W
- Built: 1894
- Architectural style: Early Commercial
- MPS: Eliot Neighborhood MPS
- NRHP reference No.: 99000357
- Added to NRHP: March 18, 1999

The Frederick Torgler Building is a building located in north Portland, Oregon listed on the National Register of Historic Places.

Bernstein's Bagels operates in the building.

== See also ==
- National Register of Historic Places listings in North Portland, Oregon
