= Portland Clean Energy Fund =

The Portland Clean Energy Fund (PCEF) is a climate and justice program based on a one percent tax on retail sales of large companies in Portland, Oregon, United States. Designed to reduce carbon emissions, it was established by a ballot measure in 2018.

== See also ==
- Sustainability in Portland, Oregon
