= Humboldt, Portland, Oregon =

Humboldt
- Neighborhood
- Interactive map of Humboldt
- Coordinates: 45°33′35″N 122°40′23″W
- Country: United States
- State: Oregon
- City: Portland

Government
  - Association: Humboldt Neighborhood Association
  - Coalition: Northeast Coalition of Neighborhoods

Area
  - Total: 0.55 sq mi (1.42 km^{2})

Population (2000)
  - Total: 5,061
  - Density: 9,230/sq mi (3,560/km^{2})

Housing
  - No. of households: 1921
  - Occupancy rate: 92% occupied
  - Owner-occupied: 821 households (43%)
  - Renting: 1100 households (57%)
  - Avg. household size: 2.63 persons

Humboldt is a neighborhood in the North and Northeast sections of Portland, Oregon. It is bordered by the neighborhoods of Piedmont to the north, King to the east, Boise to the south, and Overlook to the west.

== See also ==
- Portland foreclosure protest
- North Portland Library
