= Albina Vision Trust =

Nonprofit organization in Portland, Oregon, U.S.

- Abbreviation: AVT
- Founded: 2017
- Founder: Rukaiyah Adams
- Type: Nonprofit
- Location: Portland, Oregon, U.S.
- Executive director: Winta Yohannes
- Website: albinavision.org

Albina Vision Trust (AVT) is a nonprofit organization in Portland, Oregon, United States. The organization was established by Rukaiyah Adams in 2017. Winta Yohannes is the executive director. JT Flowers is the government relations and communications director.

== Projects and partnerships ==
AVT opened Albina One in 2025. Among other projects is a series of covers over Interstate 5.

In 2024, Albina Vision Trust and the Portland Trail Blazers partnered to create the Albina Rose Alliance.

Albina Vision Trust has also partnered with Lewis & Clark College.

== See also ==
- 1803 Fund
