= May Day Protests =

May Day Protests may refer to:

- 1971 May Day Protests in Washington, D.C.
- New Haven May Day protests, 1970
- 2009 May Day protests
- Evil May Day
- May Day Riots of 1919
- Los Angeles May Day mêlée
- 2012 May Day protests
- 2014 May Day protests
- 2015 May Day protests
- 2017 May Day protests
- 2025 May Day protests

== See also ==
- List of demonstrations against corporate globalization
