= Protests in Portland, Oregon =

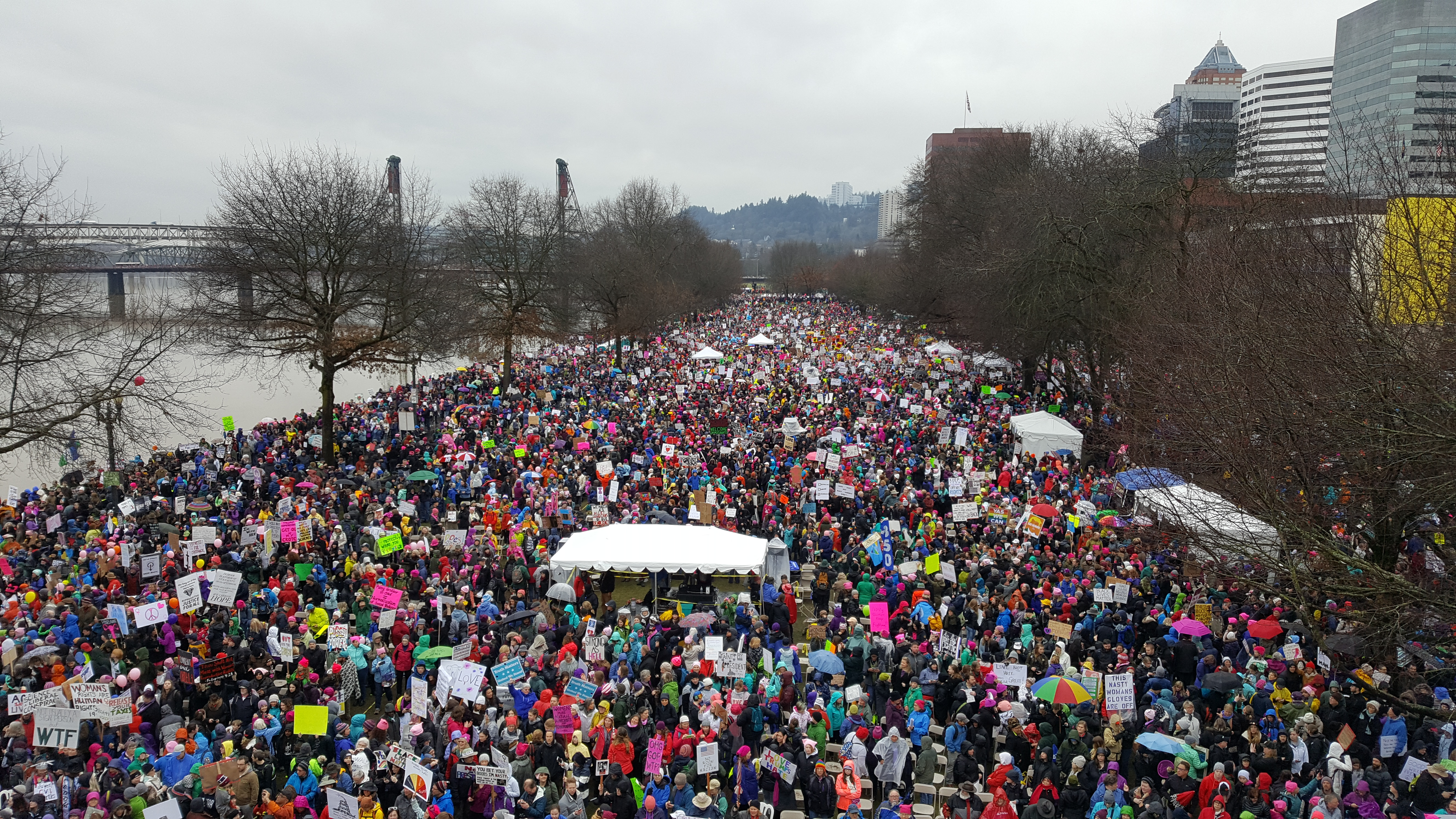
Women's March on Portland, Tom McCall Waterfront Park, 2017

Portland, Oregon has an extended history of street activism and has seen many notable protests.

== History ==
Portland's first organized demonstration was held in 1857.

=== 19th century ===
Women organized in the late 19th century around several issues. The temperance movement was especially active in Portland. Throughout Oregon and the Pacific Northwest, suffrage was brought to the ballot five times before its establishment in 1912. The movement began in the early 1870s when Abigail Scott Duniway persuaded Susan B. Anthony to join her for a speaking tour across the Pacific Northwest which spanned thousands of miles. Duniway later articulated her non-confrontational approach, explaining that she felt it important to win over men (whose votes were required to effect change) with a lighthearted, humorous approach: "Men like to be coaxed. They will not be driven."

The Direct Legislation League brought direct democracy to Oregon in the late 19th century.

=== 1900–1970 ===
Beatrice Morrow Cannady, shortly after founding the Portland chapter of the NAACP and joining the editorial staff of the local Portland paper The Advocate, organized Portland's protest of the racist film The Birth of a Nation in 1915. The protests resulted in a city ordinance banning films intended to incite racial hatred.

In the early 1960s, journalists at the Oregonian and the Oregon Journal protested labor conditions, along with other journalists around the country. They formed the newspaper The Portland Reporter, well-received during its five-year run, which undercut the business of its competitors. A strong campaign persuaded readers to cancel their Oregonian subscriptions and buy stock in the new paper. Striking workers engaged in protest marches, among other tactics. The National Labor Relations Board ultimately ruled this strike illegal.

By the 1970s, national protest of the Vietnam War peaked. Oregon had been the site of opposition to the war since at least the 1950s, when U.S. senator Wayne Morse opposed military intervention in the country and was one of only two senators who opposed the Gulf of Tonkin Resolution authorizing military action. U.S. president Richard Nixon planned to visit Portland in 1970. Some, including governor Tom McCall, predicted violent anti-war protests in the city, and planned a rock music festival in remote Milo McIver State Park to distract from efforts to protest in the city. The resulting festival, called Vortex I, became the only state-sponsored rock festival in U.S. history.

=== 1970s and 1980s ===
March Against Racism arriving at King Neighborhood Facility, April 4, 1981. Photo from The Portland Advocate front-page story from May 1981.

In 1970, a plan implemented by Portland school superintendent Robert Blanchard called for busing Black students to schools in predominantly white districts, and the closure of schools in Black neighborhoods. The Portland chapter of the National Black United Front emerged as the principal adversary of the school board at that time, implementing an array of protest tactics.

The Black United Front organized a "March Against Racism" on April 4, 1981, held in conjunction with similar marches in 37 cities across the United States, which drew an estimated crowd of 1,500 people, 70% of whom were Black. The march, which occurred less than a month after an incident in which Portland police officers threw dead possums in front of a Black-owned restaurant in Portland, was one of several large demonstrations in Portland. The following year, Oregon voters approved Ballot Measure 51, which created the first public police review committee in Portland.

The brutal murder of Mulugeta Seraw in 1988 by the East Side White Pride gang further galvanized anti-racist protests in Portland.

The Trojan Nuclear Power Plant, Oregon's only commercial nuclear power facility, was the subject of protests from its initial installation in the early 1970s until its 1992 decommissioning.

- Igor Vamos and the Guerilla Theater of the Absurd, "Little Beirut"

=== 1990s and 2000s ===
- The WTO protests in nearby Seattle on November 30, 1999, were considered highly successful. While local boosters had hoped to "showcase the city to the world as a cosmopolitan capital of trade," instead the protests of the talks came to exemplify popular opposition to globalization. The protest leadership drew heavily on veterans of two decades of "timber wars" protests of the Pacific Northwest. As a result, Seattle canceled its Y2K New Year's Eve party; Portland did not, but there were concerns about possible disruptions.
- Tre Arrow § Background
- Shooting of Kendra James (often used as a reference point for Portland police killings
- First Portland World Naked Bike Ride oil dependency protest hosted in 2004 which has grown to be the largest in the world with over 10,000 participants in 2019.

=== 2010s–present ===
Notable recent demonstrations include Hands Across Hawthorne, which was held in May 2011, and Occupy Portland, which began in October 2011. The 2016 riots were a reaction to the election of Donald Trump as US president. The Women's March was held the day after Trump's inauguration in conjunction with the 2017 Women's March. Subsequent protests during Trump's presidency included the March for Science and Trump Free Speech Rally in 2017. In a retrospective of the city's protests from November 2016 to November 2017, Shane Dixon Kavanaugh of The Oregonian wrote: "Portland's convulsive protests thrust the city into the national spotlight as they often descended into violence and chaos even as most demonstrators remained peaceful... [T]he churn of marches, demonstrations and rallies has become enduring fiber in the fabric of the city. The protests spanned issues – immigrant rights, homelessness, racism, police accountability, free speech. They drew students, parents, anarchists and Trump supporters."

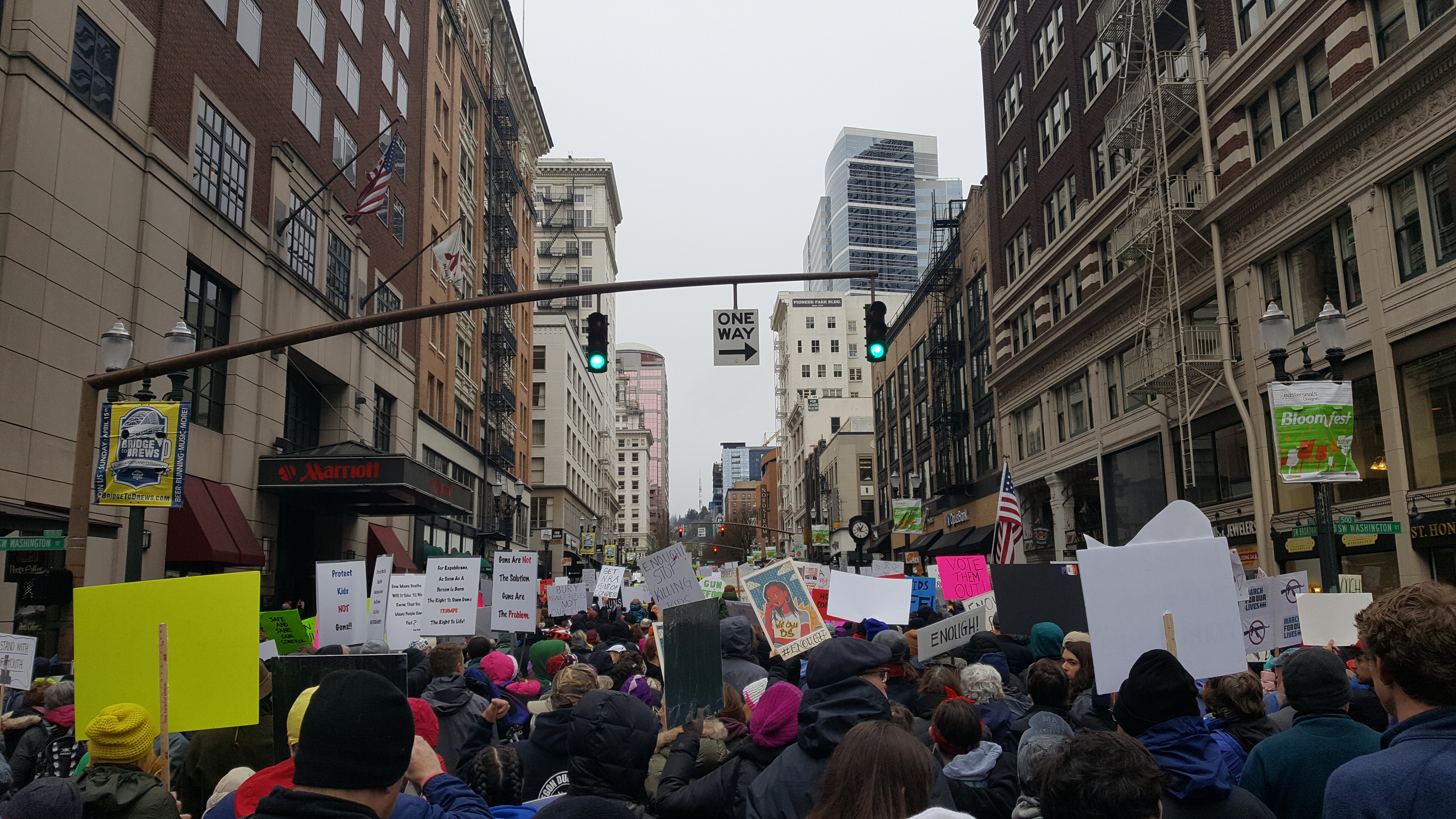
March for Our Lives Portland, 2018

The March for Our Lives was held in 2018 and the End Domestic Terrorism rally was held in 2019.

After the assassination of Qasem Soleimani in January 2020, hundreds gathered at Terry Schrunk Plaza for a "No War in Iran" protest, led by the DSA.

2020 saw the George Floyd protests, Indigenous Peoples Day of Rage, and Red House eviction defense. Portland saw protests following the election of Joe Biden. As of March 2021 the U.S. Department of Justice has dismissed 31 of the 90 protest cases resulting from protests in downtown Portland during the summer, including a mix of misdemeanor and felony charges.

March 2021 saw Portland police responding forcefully to protesters at the Hatfield U.S. Courthouse. The protests spread over two nights and were described by protestors as involving an extension of a protest over the expansion of an oil pipeline, the dismantling of the security fence in front of the Courthouse, and the murder of George Floyd. On the first night (March 12) Federal officers deployed impact munitions, tear gas, flash-bang grenades and smoke bombs at a group of a few dozen protesters who had gathered at the Hatfield U.S. Courthouse and was setting fires and smashing windows. The second night police surrounded a crowd of over 100 protesters using a process known as kettling detaining them for blocking traffic. They used pepper spray on two people outside the perimeter who were confronting the police about this tactic. Spent containers of a potentially deadly gas that had been used by the police in earlier demonstrations were also found.

On October 13, 2021, Portland Police reported that "a group of around 100 anarchists caused substantial damage to businesses and government buildings in downtown Portland Tuesday night" (Oct. 12). Participants broke numerous windows and "35 separate locations were targeted, including banks, retail stores, coffee shops, and government buildings." Police stated that some group members laid down in front of police vehicles to attempt to prevent police response, and that they believe that some people involved in criminal activity were changing clothes to stymie efforts to identify them. The cost of the damage was later estimated to be at least $500,000. Although police officers did give direction to the group over a loudspeaker to disperse and a Mobile Field Force moved in, police did not directly intervene to stop the vandalism. Portland Police Bureau officials said that this was due to legislation which restricts the tools they can use to stop people causing such destruction, and the lack of clarity on the bill.

On November 19, 2021, law enforcement in Portland declared a riot as approximately 200 demonstrators protested the acquittal of Kyle Rittenhouse, 18, who killed two people and injured another in Wisconsin. Protesters were reportedly yelling anti-police chants.and throwing objects at police, such as urine, water bottles and batteries, and the rear window of one patrol car was smashed. Windows on buildings were also broken and doors of city facilities were damaged, and there were trash and debris fires in the streets. Protesters began to engage in erecting street barricades using fencing they tore down and construction signs. The Multnomah County Sheriff's Office said a riot was declared after protesters began focusing on and "tampering with" a roll-up gate at the Justice Center. Some protesters had begun moving toward the entrance of the jail and had put large tree branches in the way to stop the gate from closing. Several people were given citations but only one person who had an outstanding warrant from another matter was arrested. By about 11 p.m. the crowd had dispersed.

In solidarity with the Mahsa Amini protests, groups of Iranian-American protesters have met in Pioneer courthouse square on with signage in the Iranian tricolor declaring "A Free Iran is Better for the World", and many signs demanding the ouster of Khamenei. Other signs declared "Justice for Iranian Women", and "my hair, my choice," and "Break the Silence, be Iranians voice." The American stars and stripes flag was featured prominently by one demonstrator. Although most chants were in Persian, an occasional refrain of "Iranian Lives Matter" was given in English. The protests continued on October 1, with hundreds gathering.

2024 saw the Portland State University pro-Palestinian campus occupation.

Since June 2025, protests against ICE have occurred continuously outside their South Waterfront field office.

== See also ==
- International Workers' Day in Portland, Oregon
- Vortex I
- The Advocate (Portland, Oregon) (re: protests of The Birth of a Nation)
- Kent Ford, founder of Portland chapter of the Black Panther Party
- Ron Herndon, founder of Portland Black United Front
