= International Workers' Day in Portland, Oregon =

Annual holiday in Portland, Oregon

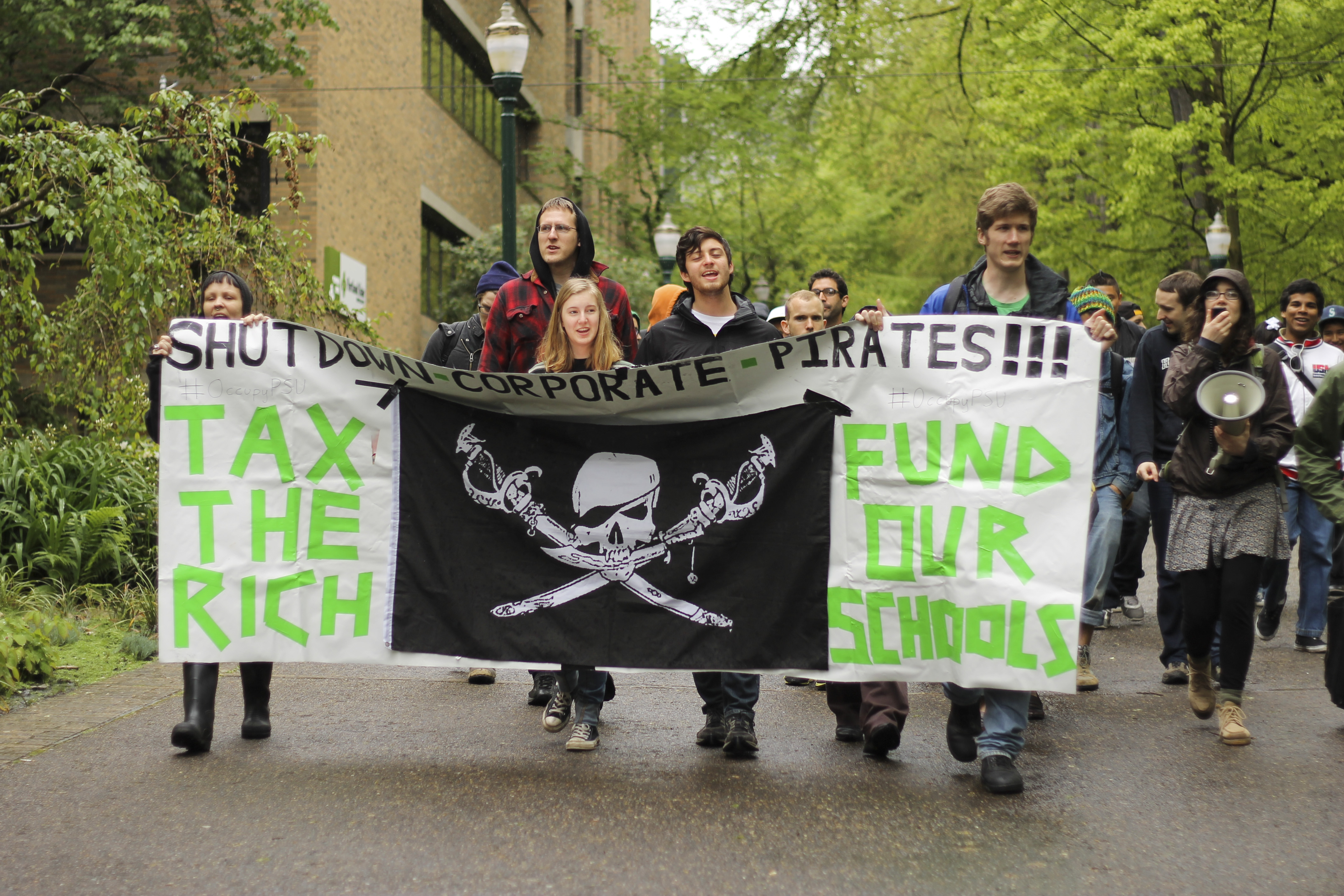
May Day demonstration at Portland State University, 2012

The holiday International Workers' Day (also known as May Day, but not to be confused with the holiday of the same name commemorating the start of summer) is celebrated annually in Portland, Oregon. The city has seen many demonstrations on the holiday, which are often referred to as "May Day protests". Some of the demonstrations have led to arrests, fires, and vandalism. Other activities have included a family-friendly picnic in 2018 and a caravan to support essential workers in 2020, during the COVID-19 pandemic.

== Events and activities ==
In addition to protests, Portland has seen other events and activities organized for the holiday. In 2018, May Day Coalition organizers hosted a family-friendly picnic at Lents Park in southeast Portland's Lents neighborhood. Approximately 200 people attended the picnic. In 2020, during the COVID-19 pandemic, a group of local social justice groups organized a car caravan in southeast Portland. There were approximately one dozen vehicles and participants stopped at businesses with essential workers, including stores operated by Fred Meyer, Grand Central Bakery, and Whole Foods.

=== Protests ===
The city has a "long history of protests" on the holiday, according to The Oregonian. In 2020, Rebecca Ellis of Oregon Public Broadcasting said, "In Portland, May Day often means big outdoor rallies and protests in honor of workers' rights." In 2021, KOIN said, "May Day demonstrations and protests are a tradition in Portland." Some of the demonstrations have resulted in arrests, fires, and vandalism.

The American Revolutionary Communist Party organized a May Day parade to Lownsdale Square in the Plaza Blocks in 1980. The Oregonian said participants were "met by aggressive counter-demonstrators, who dogged the march, shouting 'Down with communism' and 'Red is for murder.' The confrontation devolved from opposing chants into name-calling and then a brawl."

==== 2000s ====
Protesters in 2007

In 2018, Shane Dixon Kavanaugh of The Oregonian wrote:

Since 2000, a mishmash of anarchists, socialists and others opposed to capitalism's excesses have flooded downtown each May 1 to observe a day dedicated to workers' rights, a cause celebrated worldwide. The gatherings have also served as an annual rallying point for the city's diverse community of left-leaning activists. Speakers condemn police brutality. Canvassers promote plans to fight climate change. Others organize for immigrant rights.

Approximately 350 people gathered at the South Park Blocks in 2000. The scene fell into "chaos", according to Willamette Week, resulting in 20 injuries and 10 arrests. In 2016, Douglas Perry of The Oregonian wrote: "Charlie Hales, then a city commissioner, came around a downtown corner on May Day in 2000 and was stunned to find a wall of police 'for what, to my amateur eyes, was a noisy but not terribly disruptive' rally. Later that afternoon, the large, swarming labor-rights march degenerated into chaos, and police declared an emergency, with officers charging the crowd on horseback."

The May Day rally in the North Park Blocks in 2003 was attended by approximately 600 participants. An immigration protest was held in downtown Portland on May 1, 2007. In 2008, members of International Longshore and Warehouse Union (ILWU) from Portland, Astoria, and Longview stopped work for the day. Some workers as well as members of Veterans for Peace met near the Burnside Bridge for a rally and to honor soldiers killed in Iraq.

==== 2010s ====
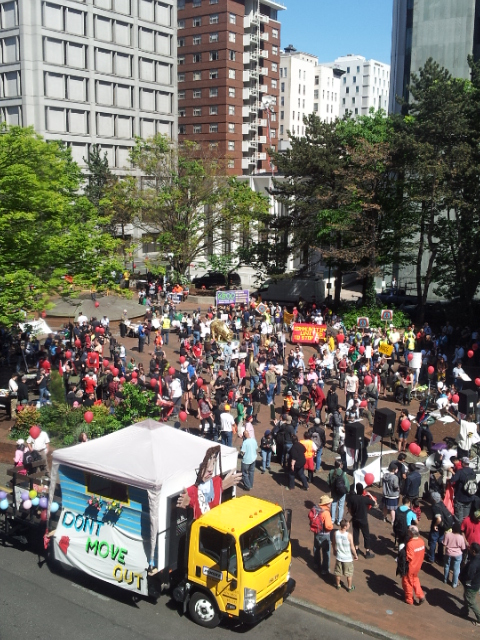
Rally at O'Bryant Square, 2013

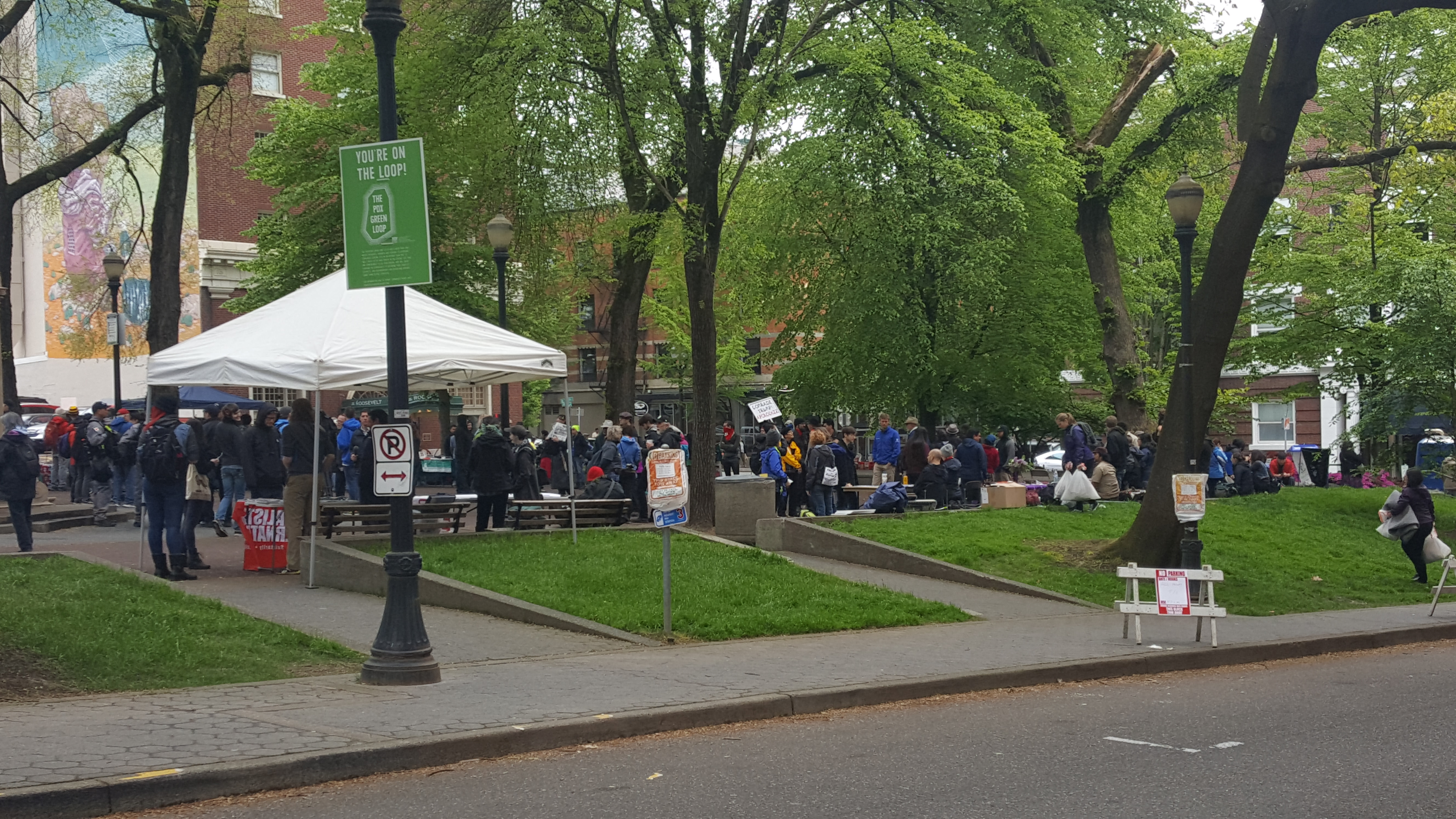
Rally at the South Park Blocks, 2017

The city saw two protests in 2010, including one at the South Park Blocks. Thousands of people marched in downtown Portland in 2010 to protest Arizona's new illegal immigration law. There were also demonstrations in downtown Portland in 2012 and 2013; in 2012, protesters gathered at the west end of the Burnside Bridge and there were 36 arrests.

Hundreds of people participated in May Day activities in 2015. KATU said the event "was initially a peaceful protest but turned violent after a splinter group left the main group". The Guardian said, "a crowd of people flung rocks and chairs at police, who responded with pepper spray and tried to hem demonstrators in along the pre-arranged route of the demonstration. Officers threw flashbang grenades to try to disperse the crowd when it tried to march onto a major bridge." One officer was injured and there were no arrests.

In 2017, 25 people were arrested in a protest deemed a riot by the Portland Police Bureau. Mayor Ted Wheeler denounced the actions of some demonstrators and commended law enforcement for a "tremendous job under very dangerous circumstances". In 2019, approximately 100 and 200 people gathered at Caruthers Park and Holladay Park, respectively; both demonstrations saw counter-protesters.

==== 2020s ====
There were multiple demonstrations in 2021. Several people were arrested. Some businesses in downtown Portland had boarded up windows ahead of the holiday, based on tensions since the George Floyd protests. In 2022, protesters gathered outside the U.S. Bancorp Tower demanding Amazon and Starbucks improve labor rights and wages; the demonstration included employees of both companies who were seeking to unionize. Some windows were smashed during a May Day protest in downtown Portland in 2024.

Multiple demonstrations were organized in 2025, including by a local chapter of the 50501 movement at the South Park Blocks, by Indivisible Cedar Mill at Pioneer Courthouse Square, and by the Portland Association of Teachers (the union for teachers at Portland Public Schools) at Terry Schrunk Plaza. Thousands attended the rally at the South Park Blocks, which included Sameer Kanal as a guest speaker, and hundreds attended the protest at Pioneer Courthouse Square. The demonstrations were peaceful.

Multiple May Day demonstrations were planned in 2026. Thousands of people joined a march starting from the South Park Blocks. The event was peaceful, apart from a few minor disputes with counter-protestors. Several hundred people gathered at the Portland ICE facility. Five people were arrested. Reporters for KGW said "the timing of May Day made it a particular flashpoint for confrontation".

== See also ==
- Culture of Portland, Oregon
- Labor history of the United States
