= 2025 May Day protests =

International protests on a variety of topics

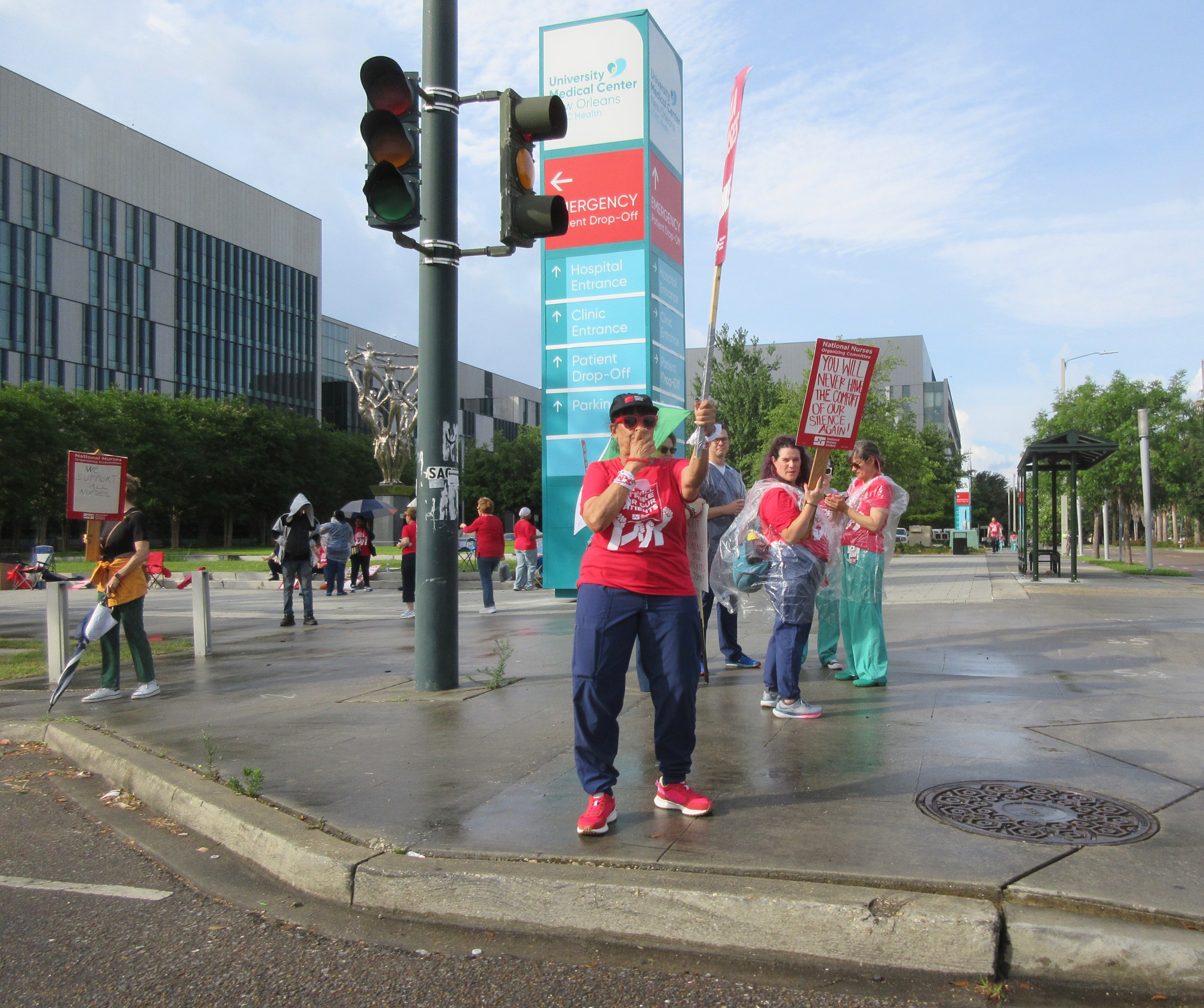
Nurses on strike in New Orleans

The 2025 May Day protests were held internationally on May 1, 2025. Demonstrations were held in France, Germany, Italy, Japan, and the United States. There were also protests in Manila and Taipei.

In the United States, protests were organized as part of the 50501 movement.

== Japan ==
Demands by protesters in Tokyo "ranged from higher wages and gender equality to health care, disaster relief, a ceasefire in Gaza and an end to Russia’s invasion of Ukraine", according to ABC News.

The National Confederation of Trade Unions (Zenroren) hosted a rally called Central May Day in Tokyo's Yoyogi Park which they announced was attended by 14,000 people. Demands put forth by the organization included significant increases in wages to improve quality of life as cost of living increases, the elimination of all forms of harassment, pursuit of gender equality, and improvement to the Japanese economy through supporting farmers as well as small and medium businesses.

The National Trade Union Council hosted another May Day rally called Hibiya May Day at Hibiya Open-Air Concert Hall attended by 3,000 people. One slogan posted at the concert hall was, "Make a society where we can survive on 8 hours of work a day." National Trade Union Council announced that while May Day rallies had been held at the concert hall for the past 36 years, 2025 would be the last held at that venue due to its scheduled closing for renovation, though they would carry on at a different venue.

Additionally, 100 members from anti-war organizations gathered in an Anti-War May Day protest in front of Mitsubishi Heavy Industries in Chiyoda, Tokyo demanding the company not have a hand in war through the manufacture of weapons.

== Turkey ==
Hundreds of protesters were detained in Istanbul.

== United States ==
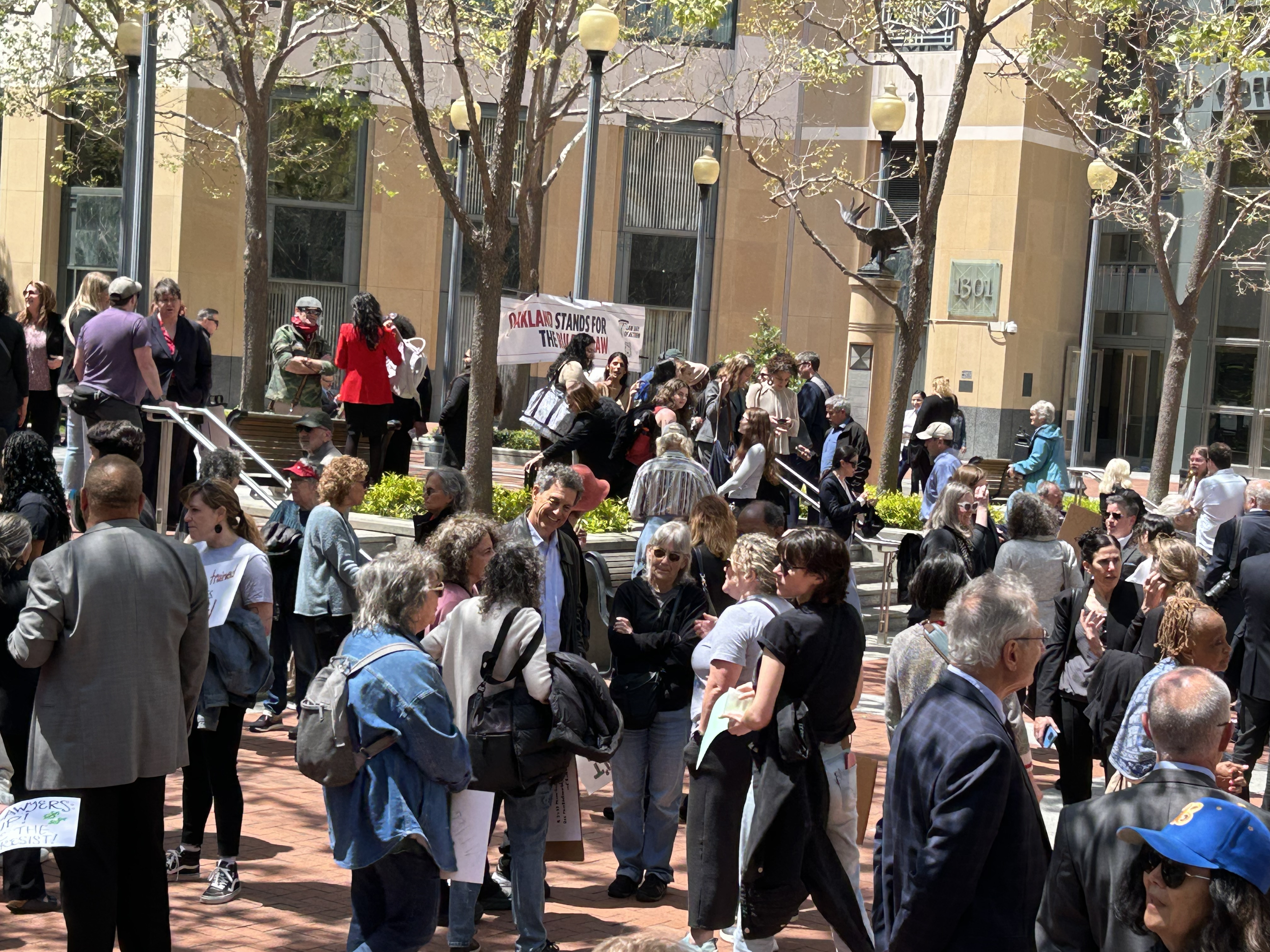
May Day protest in Oakland, California

Organizers planned over 1,000 protests across the United States on May Day, supported by the 50501 movement, unions, student groups and grassroots organizations. Protesters opposed the Trump administration and its billionaire backers including Elon Musk, accusing the administration of rolling back labor rights and targeting immigrants. The May Day protests follow a series of related protests that occurred throughout early 2025. The Associated Press estimated that hundreds of thousands of people demonstrated during protests against the Trump administration on May Day.

There were protests in Alaska.

In Arizona, a protest was planned in Phoenix.

In California, thousands of people are expected to attend a demonstration in Los Angeles. In the San Francisco Bay Area, protests are planned in Berkeley, Oakland, Pleasanton, San Francisco, and San Jose. There were demonstrations in Palm Springs and San Diego.

Idaho saw a protest in Boise.

In Illinois, thousands of protestors marched from Union Park to Grant Park through downtown. Protestors focused on the targeting of institutes of higher education, especially the University of Chicago, the targeting of immigrants, and targeting of labor unions. The protest ended at the Petrillo Music Shell in Grant Park, where speakers including mayor Brandon Johnson spoke. Mayor Johnson's short 3-minute speech briefly touched on many topics, especially workers' rights and the labor movement, encouraged Chicagoans to remain strong, and reminded Chicagoans of past challenges. There was a rally in Evanston, in the northern suburbs of Chicago.

There was a protest outside the Indiana Statehouse in Indianapolis.

In Louisiana, demonstrations are planned in Baton Rouge, Covington, and New Orleans.

Over 1,000 people demonstrated in Baltimore, Maryland.

Protests occurred in Michigan, including in Detroit.

Protests took place in Nevada.

In New York, demonstrations occurred in New York City and several other cities.

Demonstrations occurred in North Carolina. There was a protest in Hendersonville.

In Oklahoma, there was a protest in Norman.

In Oregon, protests were planned in Portland and Salem. Hundreds gathered in downtown Portland.

In Pennsylvania, Bernie Sanders spoke at a protest in Philadelphia.

In Texas, protests occurred in Dallas

A dozen protests took place in Vermont.

In Washington, protests were held in Ellensburg, Seattle, and Vancouver.

There was also a demonstration in Washington, D.C.

Wisconsin saw a protest in Sauk City.

== See also ==
- 2009 May Day protests
- 2012 May Day protests
- 2014 May Day protests
- 2015 May Day protests
- 2017 May Day protests
- 2026 May Day protests
