= Shortell =

Shortell is a surname. Notable people with the surname include:

- Max Shortell (born 1992), American football quarterback
- Timothy Shortell, American sociologist
