= 2012 May Day protests =

The 2012 May Day protests were a series of international protests that took place worldwide on 1 May 2012 over the then ongoing global economic crisis.

== History ==
The first May Day protests originated in several countries throughout Europe including Stockholm, Madrid, London, Brussels, and Geneva in 1890. While the demand for an 8-hour workday was the primary concern that protesters were protesting for, other demands included improved working conditions, universal suffrage, peace among nations, and international solidarity. While it originally started as a labor movement in protest for improved wages and working conditions, protesters - who are primarily from working-class backgrounds - now demonstrate for celebratory purposes and tradition while many others do it to create change.

Over the decades, the May Day protests and demonstrations have expanded globally and internationally to other countries including Canada, Indonesia, and Taiwan. The protests are also a part of the Occupy Movement, a movement dedicated to protesting against capitalism and the corruption of corporations and to finding solidarity within labor unions and other activist groups.

== North America ==
=== Canada ===
Protesters in Canada demonstrated to bring awareness about the impact that federal government budget cuts had on employment and job loss. The protest in Montreal also turned violent as more than 100 people were arrested during the protest.

=== United States ===
Voice of America report on New York City May Day protests

Protests were held from coast to coast in major cities including New York City, San Francisco, Chicago, Los Angeles, and Atlanta. Protests were often organized by Occupy movement. Turnout was lower than that of other countries because the protests were held on a work day.

- New York City – There were rallies protesting Wall Street, banks, and major institutions. A march to Bank of America was led by Occupy Wall Street. There were also protests of New York University's expansion into Greenwich Village. At least 50 people were arrested. Occupy Wall Street had called for a general strike, which did not materialize.
- San Francisco – Protesters disrupted ferry service.
- Oakland, California – Protests were dispersed by police with the use of tear gas.
- Seattle - Protesters in Seattle, who primarily consisted of teens and young adults in their early 20s, demonstrated to call the end to capitalism. The protests in Seattle got violent as windows and glass panels were shattered and smoke bombs were set off.

== Asia ==
=== Indonesia ===
Thousands of protesters marched through the capital demanding higher wages and better working conditions. President Susilo Bambang Yudhoyono responded by announcing a higher tax-free income ceiling and additional subsidized housing.

=== Philippines ===
Protesters gathered in Manila to demand higher wages and policies to prevent workers from termination.

=== Taiwan ===
Protesters in Taiwan marched through the streets of downtown Taiwan to demand for a number of things including higher wages, lower school tuition, and better conditions for foreign workers.

== Europe ==
=== Sweden ===
Two different demonstrations were organized in Gothenburg, one by the Swedish Social Democratic Party with the Swedish Trade Union Confederation (Landsorganisationen) which attracted 2,450 participants, and a second organized by the Left Party which attracted 3,400 participants.

== See also ==
- 2009 May Day protests
- 2013 May Day protests
- 2015 May Day protests
- 2017 May Day protests
- 2025 May Day protests
- List of protests in the 21st century
