= List of City University of New York alumni =

This is a list of alumni of City University of New York, United States, organised alphabetically by surname.

Name	Grad.	College	Notable for
Kenneth Arrow	1940	City	economist and joint winner of the Nobel Prize in Economics
Robert Aumann	1950	City	mathematician and winner of the Nobel Prize in Economics
Albert Axelrod		City	Olympic foil fencer
Herman Badillo	1951	City	civil rights activist and first Puerto Rican elected to the US Congress
Daniel Bukantz		City	Olympic foil fencer
Abram Cohen		City	Olympic foil, épée, and saber fencer
Arlene Davila	1996	City	author and Anthropology and American Studies professor at New York University
Rubén Díaz Jr.	2005	Lehman	Bronx borough president
Rubén Díaz Sr.	1976	Lehman	NYC Council member, pastor
Jeffrey Dinowitz	1975	Lehman	NYS Assembly member
Jesse Douglas	1916	City	mathematician and winner of one of the first two Fields Medals
Eliot Engel	1969	Lehman	member of the US House of Representatives, chairman of the House Foreign Affairs Committee
Abraham Foxman		City	national director, Anti-Defamation League
Felix Frankfurter	1902	City	US Supreme Court justice
Denise Galloway	1975	City	cancer researcher and medical academic
Harold Goldsmith	1952	City	Olympic foil and épée fencer
Andy Grove	1960	City	chairman and CEO, Intel Corporation
Herbert A. Hauptman	1937	City	mathematician and winner of the Nobel Prize in Chemistry
Letitia James	1982	Lehman	NYS attorney general
Barbara Joans	1974		anthropologist who researched biker culture
Jane Katz	1963	City	Olympic swimmer
Henry Kissinger		City	US secretary of state and national security advisor
Leonard Kleinrock	1957	City	computer scientist, Internet pioneer
Guillermo Linares	1975	City	New York City Council member, first Dominican-American City Council member and commissioner of the mayor's Office of Immigrant Affairs
Nathaniel Lubell	1936	City	Olympic foil, saber, and épée fencer
Samuel Lubell		City	pollster, journalist, and National Book Award for Nonfiction finalist
Lisa Nakamura	1993 1996	City	director and professor of the Asian American Studies Program at the Institute of Communication Research at the University of Illinois Urbana-Champaign
Charles Neider		City	author, scholar
Barnett Newman	1927	City	abstract expressionist artist
John O'Keefe		City	2014 Nobel laureate in Medicine
Colin Powell	1958	City	chairman of the Joint Chiefs of Staff and secretary of state
Mario Puzo		City	novelist, Oscar-winning screenwriter for Best Adapted Screenplay (1972, 1974)
Faith Ringgold	1955	City	feminist, writer and artist
Saul Rogovin		City BMCC	professional baseball player
A. M. Rosenthal	1949	City	executive editor of The New York Times who championed the publication of the Pentagon Papers; Pulitzer Prize–winning journalist expelled from Poland in 1959 for his reporting on the nation's government and society
Rochelle Saidel		City	author, founder of the Remember the Women Institute
Jonas Salk	1934	City	developed the first polio vaccine
Daniel Schorr	1939	City	Emmy award-winning broadcast journalist for CBS-TV and National Public Radio
Elliott Fitch Shepard	1855	City	lawyer, banker, and a founder of the New York State Bar Association
James Strauch		City	Olympic épée fencer
Bernard Weinraub		City	journalist and playwright
Henry Wittenberg		City	Olympic champion wrestler
Egemen Bağış		Baruch	Turkish politician, government minister
Abraham Beame	1928	Baruch	born Abraham Birnbaum; mayor of New York City
Robin Byrd		Baruch	host of public access program The Robin Byrd Show (dropped out)
Barbara A. Cornblatt	1977	Baruch	professor of psychiatry and molecular medicine at Hofstra University School of Medicine
Fernando Ferrer		Baruch	New York City mayoral candidate in 2001 and 2005
Sidney Harman	1939	Baruch	founder and executive chairman of Harman Kardon
Marcia A. Karrow		Baruch	member of New Jersey General Assembly
James Lam	1983	Baruch	author, risk management consultant
Ralph Lauren		Baruch	born Ralph Lifshitz; chairman and CEO of Polo Ralph Lauren (dropped out)
Dolly Lenz		Baruch	New York City real estate agent
Dennis Levine		Baruch	prominent player in the Wall Street insider trading scandals of the mid-1980s
Jennifer Lopez		Baruch	actress, singer, dancer (dropped out)
Craig A. Stanley		Baruch	member of New Jersey General Assembly since 1996
Tarkan		Baruch	Turkish language singer
Bella Abzug	1942	Hunter	born Bella Savitzky; feminist; political activist; US representative, 1971–1977
Carmen Beauchamp Ciparick	1963	Hunter	first Hispanic woman named to the New York State Court of Appeals
Robert R. Davila	1965	Hunter	president of Gallaudet University and advocate for the rights of the hearing impaired
Ruby Dee	1945	Hunter	Emmy-nominated actress and civil rights activist
Martin Garbus	1955	Hunter	First Amendment attorney
Florence Howe	1950	Hunter	founder of women's studies and founder/publisher of the Feminist Press/CUNY
Audre Lorde	1959	Hunter	African-American lesbian poet, essayist, educator and activist
Mohamed Mahmoud Ould Mohamedou	1991	Hunter	foreign minister of Mauritania and professor of international history at the Graduate Institute of International and Development Studies in Geneva
Soia Mentschikoff	1934	Hunter	first female partner of a major law firm; first woman elected president of the Association of American Law Schools
Thomas J. Murphy Jr.	1973	Hunter	three-term mayor of Pittsburgh, Pennsylvania, 1994–2006
Pauli Murray	1933	Hunter	first African-American woman named an Episcopal priest; human rights activist; lawyer and co-founder of N.O.W.
Edward Thomas Brady		John Jay	MA, trial attorney and associate justice of the Supreme Court of North Carolina
Jennings Michael Burch		John Jay	author of the 1984 best-selling memoir They Cage the Animals at Night
Marcos Crespo		John Jay	BA, New York state assemblyman representing district 85
Edward A. Flynn		John Jay	chief of the Milwaukee Police Department
Petri Hawkins-Byrd	1989	John Jay	Judge Judy bailiff
Henry Lee	1972	John Jay	forensic scientist and founder of the Henry C. Lee Institute of Forensic Science
Miguel Martinez		John Jay	BS, member of the New York City Council representing the 10th District in upper Manhattan's Washington Heights, Inwood, and Marble Hill areas until his resignation on July 14, 2009
Eva Norvind		John Jay	MA, actor and director
Pauley Perrette		John Jay	actor best known for her role as Abby Scuito on NCIS
Ronald Rice		John Jay	New Jersey State senator
Ariel Rios		John Jay	undercover special agent for the United States Bureau of Alcohol, Tobacco, Firearms and Explosives (ATF), killed in the line of duty
Imette St. Guillen		John Jay	criminal justice graduate student murdered in February 2006; a scholarship was created in her name
Scott Stringer		John Jay	comptroller, borough president of Manhattan, and member of the New York State Assembly
Dorothy Uhnak		John Jay	BA, novelist and detective for the New York City Transit Police Department
Bill Baird	1955	Brooklyn	reproductive rights activist and co-director of the Pro Choice League
Barbara Aronstein Black	1953	Brooklyn	dean of Columbia Law School
Barbara Levy Boxer	1962	Brooklyn	anti-war activist, environmentalist, US representative, 1982–1993, and US senator
Mel Brooks	1956	Brooklyn	born Melvin Kaminsky; Academy, Emmy, and Tony Award-winning director, writer, and actor
Shirley Chisholm	1946	Brooklyn	first African-American US congresswoman, 1968–1982; candidate for US president, 1972
Bruce Chizen	1978	Brooklyn	president & CEO, Adobe Systems
Manuel F. Cohen	1933	Brooklyn	Securities and Exchange Commission chairman
Paul Cohen	1953	Brooklyn	Fields Medal-winning mathematician
Stanley Cohen	1943	Brooklyn	biochemist and Nobel laureate (Physiology or Medicine), 1986
Robert A. Daly		Brooklyn	CEO of Warner Bros. and Los Angeles Dodgers
Alan M. Dershowitz	1959	Brooklyn	Harvard Law School professor and author
Jerry Della Femina	1957	Brooklyn	chairman & CEO, Della Femina, Jeary and Partners
Dan DiDio	1983	Brooklyn	comic book editor and executive for DC Comics
Benjamin Eisenstadt	1954	Brooklyn	creator of Sweet'N Low and founder of Cumberland Packing Corporation
Sandra Feldman	1960	Brooklyn	president, American Federation of Teachers
James Franco		Brooklyn	Golden Globe Award-winning actor
Nikki Franke	1972	Brooklyn	Olympic foil fencer
Ralph Goldstein		Brooklyn	Olympic épée fencer
Sterling Johnson Jr.	1963	Brooklyn	Senior United States district judge of the United States District Court for the Eastern District of New York
Gata Kamsky	1999	Brooklyn	chess grandmaster and five-time US chess champion
Saul Katz	1960	Brooklyn	president of the New York Mets
Edward R. Korman	1963	Brooklyn	senior United States district judge on the United States District Court for the Eastern District of New York
Marvin Kratter	1937	Brooklyn	owner of the Boston Celtics
Don Lemon	1996	Brooklyn	reporter, CNN
Leonard Lopate	1967	Brooklyn	host of the public radio talk show The Leonard Lopate Show, broadcast on WNYC
Michael Lynne	1961	Brooklyn	CEO of New Line Cinema
Marjorie Magner	1969	Brooklyn	chairman of Gannett
Marty Markowitz	1970	Brooklyn	New York state senator; Brooklyn borough president
Paul Mazursky	1951	Brooklyn	film director, writer, producer; actor
Frank McCourt	1967	Brooklyn	Pulitzer Prize-winning author of Angela's Ashes and 'Tis
Stanley Milgram	1954	Brooklyn	social psychologist
Jerry Moss	1957	Brooklyn	co-founder of A&M Records
Barry Munitz	1963	Brooklyn	chancellor of California State University
Gloria Naylor	1981	Brooklyn	novelist; winner of National Book Award
Peter Nero	1956	Brooklyn	born Bernard Nierow; pianist and pops conductor; Grammy Award winner
Harvey Pitt	1965	Brooklyn	chairman of the Securities and Exchange Commission
Rosemary S. Pooler	1959	Brooklyn	United States circuit judge of the United States Court of Appeals for the Second Circuit
Jason K. Pulliam	1995; 1997	Brooklyn	United States district judge of the United States District Court for the Western District of Texas
Barry Salzberg	1974	Brooklyn	CEO of Deloitte Touche Tohmatsu
Bernie Sanders		Brooklyn	US senator representing Vermont
Steve Schirripa	1980	Brooklyn	actor known for his role as Bobby Baccalieri on the HBO TV series The Sopranos
Irwin Shaw	1934	Brooklyn	born Irwin Shamforoff; O. Henry Award-winning author
Timothy Shortell	1992	Brooklyn	writer, critic of religion
Joel Harvey Slomsky	1967	Brooklyn	senior United States district judge of the United States District Court for the Eastern District of Pennsylvania
Jimmy Smits	1980	Brooklyn	Emmy Award-winning actor; NYPD Blue and L.A. Law
Maynard Solomon	1950	Brooklyn	co-founder of Vanguard Records
Lisa Staiano-Coico	1976	Brooklyn	president of City College of New York
Frank Tarloff		Brooklyn	Academy Award-winning screenwriter
Benjamin Ward	1960	Brooklyn	first black New York City Police commissioner, 1983–1989
Iris Weinshall	1975	Brooklyn	vice chancellor at the City University of New York and commissioner of the New York City Department of Transportation
Jack B. Weinstein	1943	Brooklyn	senior judge, United States District Court for the Eastern District of New York
Walter Yetnikoff	1953	Brooklyn	CEO of CBS Records
Philip Zimbardo	1954	Brooklyn	social psychologist
Joy Behar	1964	Queens	comedian, television personality
Jerry Colonna		Queens	venture capitalist and entrepreneur coach
Joseph Crowley		Queens	member of the US House of Representatives, 1999–2019
Alan Hevesi		Queens	New York State comptroller, New York state assemblyman, Queens College professor
Cheryl Lehman	1975	Queens	professor of Accounting, Hofstra University
Helen Marshall		Queens	Queens borough president
Donna Orender		Queens	WNBA president
Jerry Seinfeld	1976	Queens	actor and comedian
Charles Wang		Queens	founder of Computer Associates, owner of the New York Islanders
Carl Andrews		Medgar Evers	New York state senator
Yvette Clarke		Medgar Evers	congresswoman, member of the United States House of Representatives from New York's 11th and 9th congressional districts
Richard Carmona	1973	Bronx	Surgeon General of the United States
Kid Chaos	1991	Bronx	British rock bassist and guitarist who played in incarnations of hard rock bands such as The Cult
The Kid Mero		Bronx	co-host of Desus & Mero
Annabel Palma	1991	Bronx	NYC Council member, 2004–2017
Cardi B		BMCC	rapper
Queen Latifah		BMCC	singer-songwriter, rapper, actress, and producer
Adam Saleh		BMCC	YouTuber and boxer
Mirko Savone		BMCC	Italian voiceover actor
Assata Shakur		BMCC	former member of Black Liberation Army, 1970–1981
Gabourey Sidibe		BMCC	actress
Michael K. Williams		BMCC	actor
Riddick Bowe		Kingsborough	professional boxer, 1989–2008
Mauriel Carty		Kingsborough	Anguillan sprinter
Andrew Dice Clay		Kingsborough	stand-up comedian, actor, musician and producer
Pete Falcone		Kingsborough	professional baseball pitcher
Jeff Koinange	1989	Kingsborough	journalist and host of Jeff Koinange Live
Phillipe Nover		Kingsborough	mixed martial artist
Larry Seabrook	1972	Kingsborough	NYC Council member, 2002–2012
Aesha Waks		Kingsborough	actress
Khandi Alexander		Queensborough	dancer, choreographer, and actress
Sandra "Pepa" Denton		Queensborough	rapper and songwriter, member of Salt-N-Pepa
Cheryl "Salt" James		Queensborough	rapper and songwriter, member of Salt-N-Pepa
Nayan Padrai		Queensborough	screenwriter, producer and director
Joe Santagato		Queensborough	YouTuber, comedian and podcaster
Elly Gross	1993	LaGuardia	Holocaust survivor and author of several Holocaust-related books of poetry and prose
DJ JP		LaGuardia	DJ
Reby Sky		LaGuardia	professional wrestler and model
Elliott Wilson		LaGuardia	journalist, television producer, and magazine editor
