= Borough of Manhattan Community College =

Public college in New York City, New York, US

Coordinates: 40.71768°N 74.01188°W

- Type: Public community college
- Established: 1963; 63 years ago
- President: Anthony E. Munroe
- Students: 21,900 (Fall 2025)
- Location: New York City, New York, U.S.
- Campus: Urban
- Website: www.bmcc.cuny.edu

The Borough of Manhattan Community College (BMCC) is a public community college in New York City. Founded in 1963 as part of the City University of New York (CUNY) system, BMCC grants associate degrees in a wide variety of vocational, business, health, science, engineering and continuing education fields.

BMCC's original campus was scattered all over midtown Manhattan, utilizing office spaces, hotel conference rooms, and various spaces throughout Manhattan. In the mid-1970s, CUNY began scouting for suitable property on which to erect a new campus of its own. The current campus has been in use since 1983.

== History ==
Martin B. Dworkis was BMCC's first president. Classes were originally held in part of the ground floor, the entire second floor, and part of the third floor of an office building at 131 West 50th Street in midtown Manhattan. BMCC renovated the office space into classrooms and administrative areas, and it created its own entrance at 134 West 51st Street. Fred Kelly, a graphic designer living in Kew Gardens, designed BMCC's official seal. BMCC's first classes were held in fall 1964. During its first school year, 42 percent of its students were African American.

Plans were announced for BMCC to have its own buildings to hold its classes in 1968. In 1974, the Middle States Association of Colleges and Schools determined that BMCC's physical facilities were "so inadequate as to defy description", and it said it would suspend BMCC's accreditation unless improvements were made quickly. The City University of New York's central administration evaluated BMCC the same year, and it found that student grades were inflated to such an extent that they were essentially meaningless. There was a ground-breaking ceremony on a new building for BMCC the same year. Because of the 1975 New York City fiscal crisis, however, construction was suspended the next year. In 1977, BMCC's president, Edgar D. Draper, was fired after he improperly persuaded a college association evaluation team to alter its report to show the college administration more favorably. By 1980, BMCC's passing rates on nursing certification exams had significantly improved, and BMCC no longer had a financial deficit. BMCC's new campus building opened in January 1983. A 15-story building at 30 West Broadway was donated to BMCC in 1993 by Miles and Shirley Fiterman; the building was subsequently named Fiterman Hall in their honor.

On the morning of September 11, 2001, BMCC's students, teachers, and staff members heard explosions coming from the direction of the World Trade Center, which was located just a few blocks away. Port Authority of New York and New Jersey used the gymnasium at BMCC's main building to triage survivors, and BMCC donated medical supplies from BMCC's Nursing Department to treat victims. The Port Authority set up generators at BMCC's main building, and the building became its command center. That afternoon, 7 World Trade Center, across the street from BMCC's Fiterman Hall, collapsed, and the building fell onto Fiterman Hall, rendering the hall uninhabitable. BMCC's staff worked constantly to restore Fiterman Hall and, on October 1, the building reopened for classes. The hall was eventually demolished and a new building opened in September 2012.

== Academics ==
Undergraduate demographics as of Fall 2026
| Race and ethnicity | Total |
|---|---|
| Hispanic | 45% |
| Black | 26% |
| Asian | 11% |
| White | 8% |
| Other (Note: Other consists of multiracial Americans & those who prefer to not say.) | 3% |
Economic diversity
| Low-income (Note: The percentage of students who received an income-based federal Pell Grant intended for low-income students.) | 61% |
| Affluent (Note: The percentage of students who are a part of the American middle class at the bare minimum.) | 39% |

BMCC has also recorded a large rise in remedial education, lack of freshman retention, and overcrowding. Due to its larger base of capital compared to most other two-year colleges, expansion of new campuses during the rebuilding of Fiterman Hall was possible. Several trailers are still used as classrooms to help expand capacity. Internal programs have also been created or expanded to help with academic advisement, provide online access for registration, transferring to other colleges, and job placement.

BMCC also has a diverse student base, some of whom had immigrated to America shortly before enrolling. Among other issues are improving the retention and graduation rate, as well as the increased financial and academic burdens of a remedial program.

== Campus ==
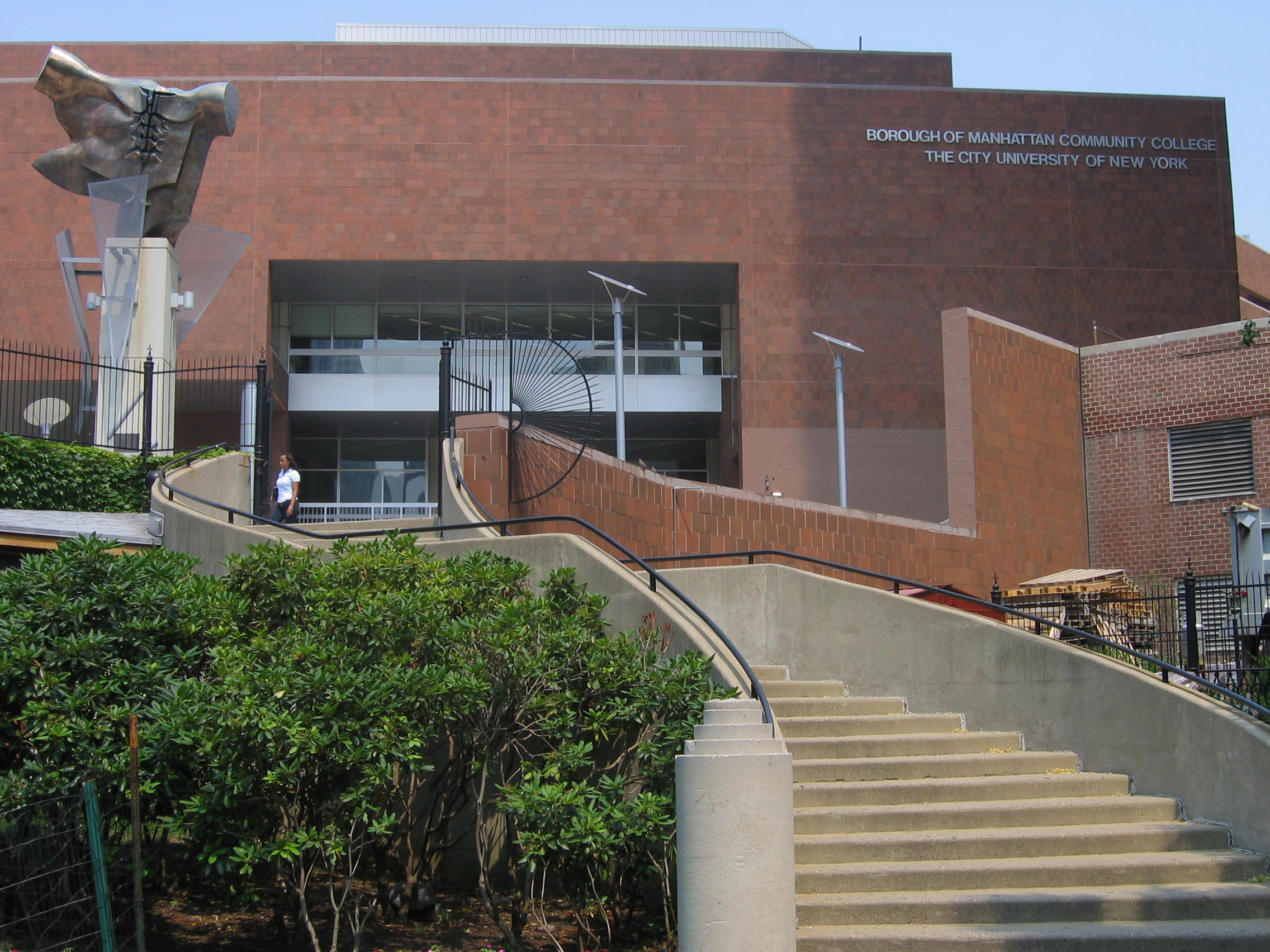
Main entrance (2006)

Borough of Manhattan Community College's four main campuses are in the Tribeca, Civic Center, and Financial District neighborhood of Lower Manhattan. BMCC occasionally hosts the Tribeca Film Festival's ceremonies and films. The main campus on 4.28 acres is located in Chambers Street, North Moore Street and covers a four block radius. It houses a swimming pool and gymnasium as well as technical facilities, computer laboratories, and a media centre.

=== Downtown/Tribeca campus ===
- 199 Chambers Street, New York, NY 10008 – Main Campus
- 245 Greenwich Street (North entrance), 81 Barclay Street (South entrance); New York, NY 10007 – Fiterman Hall
- 70 Murray Street, New York, NY 10008 – Murray Building

==== Fiterman Hall ====
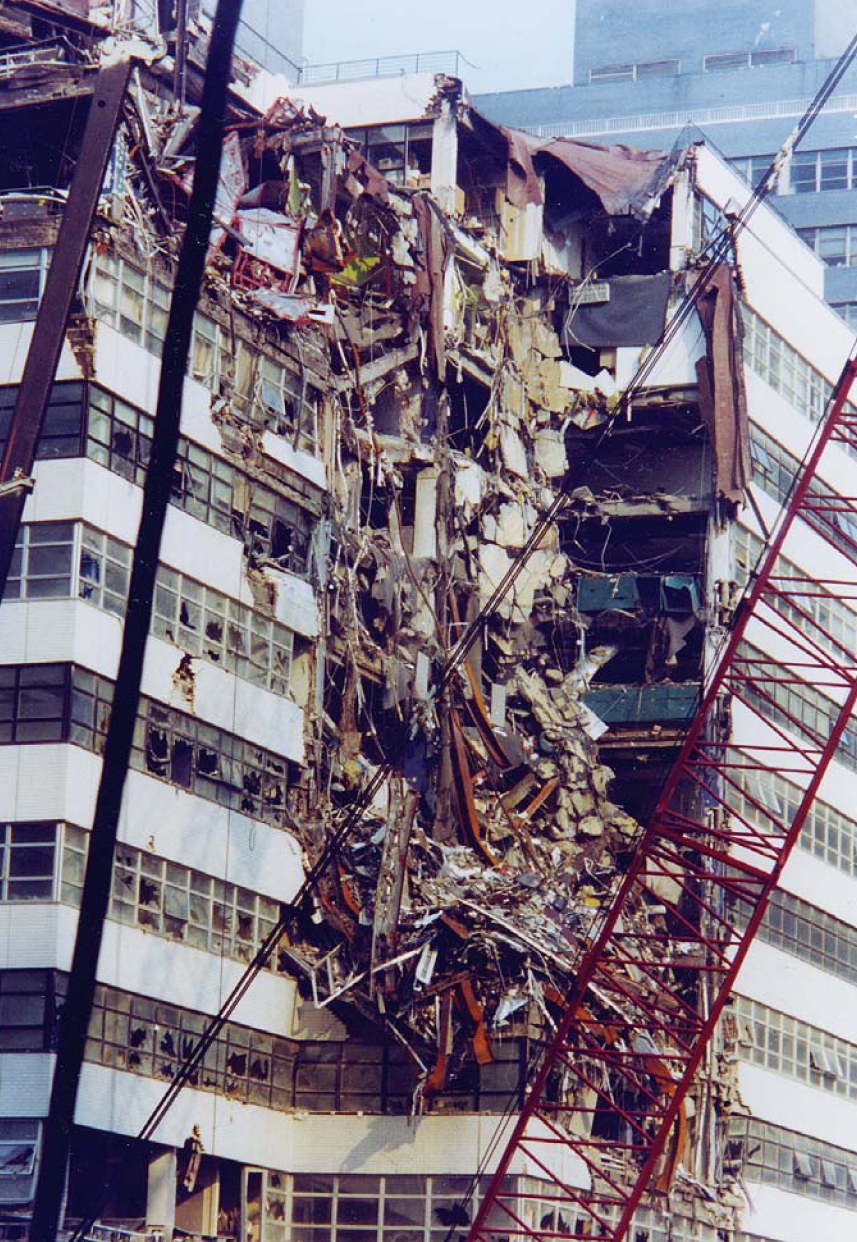
Fiterman Hall was heavily damaged from the collapse of 7 World Trade Center on 9/11.

The original Fiterman Hall opened in 1959 and occupied a block bounded by Greenwich Street, Barclay Street, West Broadway, and Park Place. It had been the original location of King's College, before it was renamed Columbia University and moved to Morningside Heights. Fiterman Hall was donated to BMCC in 1993 by Miles and Shirley Fiterman, for whom the building was subsequently named. The building had previously been used as a bank, and CUNY had wanted to rent the building from the Fitermans, but they decided to donate the building to CUNY instead. It was the largest gift of a building to a community college in the United States, and it was the largest donation ever to CUNY. The building was renamed Miles and Shirley Fiterman Hall. In 2000, the Dormitory Authority of the State of New York, which owned the building, began a massive renovation to better adapt the building for classroom use.

During the September 11 attacks, the building's structure was heavily compromised by debris from the collapse of 7 World Trade Center, and the renovation was never completed. The building became unsafe to occupy because of exposed asbestos and mold growth. Since traditional demolition would result in an unacceptable environmental impact, the building was scheduled for deconstruction and decontamination as a part of the Lower Manhattan redevelopment project.

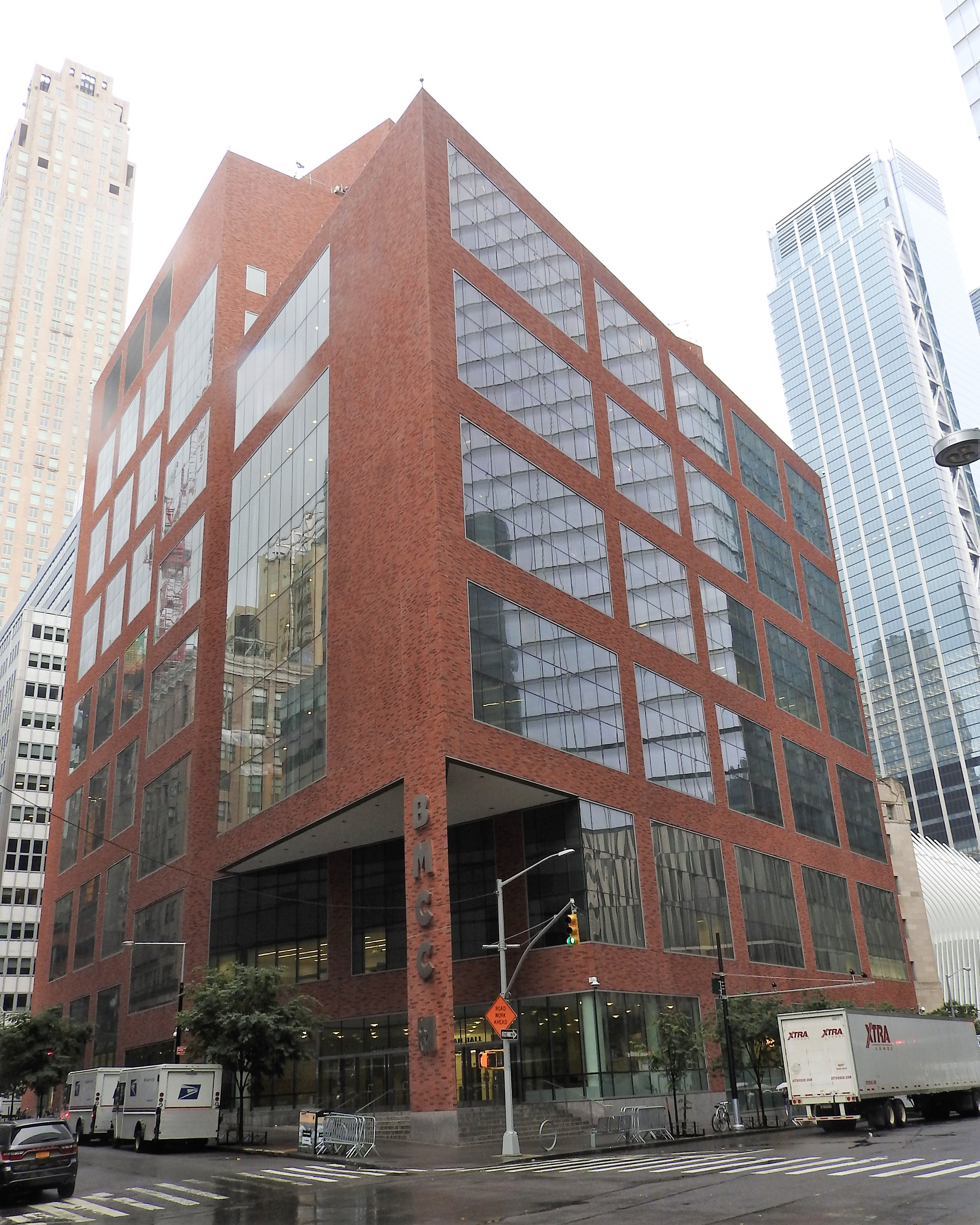
New Fiterman Hall

Fiterman Hall was to be replaced by a new building designed by the architectural firm Pei Cobb Freed & Partners after the deconstruction, and was scheduled to be completed by February 2007. However, environmental impact concerns and funding issues caused numerous delays. At a press conference at BMCC on November 13, 2008, city and state officials announced a new agreement that revised demolition and reconstruction plans through a funding agreement among New York City, New York State, and the City University of New York. In addition, approximately $80 million from an insurance settlement would be applied to the project's budget. Under the plan, the building was demolished in November 2009, and the new Fiterman Hall was completed in September 2012.

=== Off-site programs ===
- Brooklyn College
- CUNY in the Heights
- John Jay College
- Lehman College
- Long Island University Brooklyn
- St. John's University Manhattan

== Athletics ==
College teams of the BMCC participate as a member of the National Junior College Athletic Association (NJCAA). The Panthers are a member of the community college section of the City University of New York Athletic Conference (CUNYAC). Men's sports include baseball, basketball, soccer and swimming; while women's sports include basketball, soccer, swimming and volleyball.

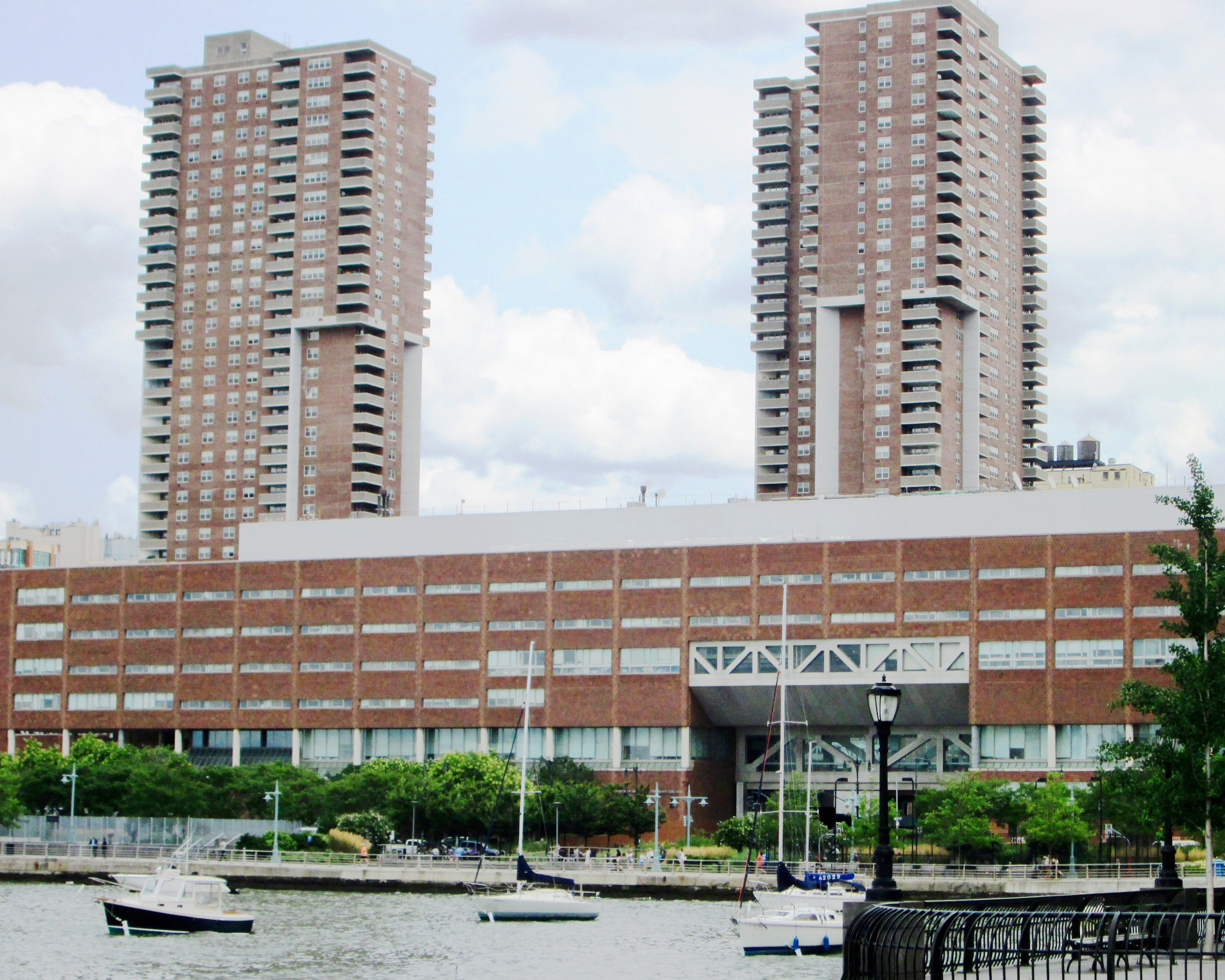
Western side of the main campus building, at the Hudson River. Behind it are the Independence Plaza North and South towers

BMCC offers a large state-of-the-art recreation facility including a regulation basketball court, swimming pool, and weight room. There are active teams in many sports such as handball, bowling, baseball, soccer, and basketball. Sports teams compete in both the CUNY athletic system and the local NJCAA collegiate sports system. The women's basketball team has won numerous championships including the CUNY basketball championship and the regional Division III championships including placing third nationally in 2000 with a 21–3 regular season record. The chess team has won national awards. One of the most successful programs at BMCC is the men's soccer team with 6 consecutive wins at CUNY soccer championships, 1 regional Division III championship, and placing third in the NJCAA national championship in 2005.

== Notable alumni ==
- Cardi B, rapper (did not graduate)
- Kid Chaos, musician
- Queen Latifah, rapper, singer, and actress
- Saul Rogovin, professional baseball player
- Mirko Savone, voice-over actor
- Gabourey Sidibe, actress
- Adam Saleh, YouTuber and boxer
- Michael K. Williams, actor
- Mark MacDonald, politician
- Ylon Schwartz, professional poker player (did not graduate)
- Assata Shakur, activist
- Brenda Howard, activist
- Nikki Lucas, politician
- Darlene Mealy, politician
