= Ron Herndon =

American activist (born c. 1946)

- Born: December 18, 1945 (age 80); Coffeyville, Kansas, U.S.
- Education: Reed College
- Occupation: Activist

Ron Herndon is an American activist. He was born on December 18, 1945 in Coffeyville, Kansas. He moved to Portland, Oregon, in 1968 to attend Reed College, where he convinced the college to start a Black Studies program. He earned a B. A. in history in 1970; his thesis was titled "Racism in the Portland Public Schools."

The same year he graduated, he opened the Black Education Center, which offered educational opportunities for Black children in Portland. His leadership of that organization lead to him becoming co-chair of the Portland chapter of the National Black United Front, which he co-founded in 1978, largely in response to the Portland Public Schools board's failure to implement recommendations by the Community Coalition for School Integration. Herndon organized a boycott by 4,000 Black students in 1982 to keep Harriet Tubman Middle School open. He led a march in support of Nelson Mandela in 1984.

In 1989, then-mayor Bud Clark made a racially offensive remark, and refused for several weeks to apologize. Herndon and fellow activists ultimately extracted an apology from Clark by threatening to convene rallies, sit-ins and boycotts. News coverage at the time described Herndon as an "expert at confrontation and the most powerful activist in Northeast Portland" and noted that he had political clout in bending city policy toward the benefit of Black people and the poor, but that he was uninterested in elective office. Herndon discussed his own political evolution in the article, saying, "In the past, you had to attack the system. You had to beat down the doors to get in." Now, he said, he can communicate within the system.

Described as "the firebrand" of Portland by Willamette Week, Herndon organized efforts to oust Portland Public Schools superintendent Ben Canada in 2001.

A dossier of Herndon was kept by the Portland Police Bureau and only uncovered in 2002 by the Portland Tribune. The file kept notes on visitors to his home, including license plate numbers. At that time he was chairman of the board of National Head Start Association.

In May 2020, at the outset of the George Floyd Black Lives Matter protests and during the COVID-19 pandemic, Herndon said: "Racism – for [Black americans], that is the original pandemic in this country and it can't be escaped," while disagreeing with the actions of the early anti–police brutality protesters in downtown Portland.

== See also ==
- Protests in Portland, Oregon
