= Shane Dixon Kavanaugh =

Shane Dixon Kavanaugh is a journalist for The Oregonian.

Kavanaugh graduated from the Craig Newmark Graduate School of Journalism at the City University of New York in 2010. According to the journalism school, he was awarded $10,000 to fund his plan to create "an ad cooperative bringing together some of the best hyperlocal media in Brooklyn with the magazine he already publishes there".

Kavanaugh's "Fleeing Justice" was a finalist for the Goldsmith Prize for Investigative Reporting in 2020. According to The Oregonian, "The series revealed for the first time a pattern of cases in which Saudi citizens disappeared while facing criminal charges in the U.S., purportedly with the help of the government of Saudi Arabia." He also received the Stephen B. Shepard Prize for Investigative Reporting, which is presented to graduates of the Craig Newmark Graduate School of Journalism, in 2020. In 2022, he received the Bruce Baer award for his 2021 investigation into a grant award by the Portland Clean Energy Fund. In 2025, Kavanaugh and Teresa Mahoney won in the 'best online multimedia project' category of the annual Oregon Newspaper Publishers Association's (ONPA) Pacific Northwest News Contest for their video on "donut voting". Kavanaugh and Lillian Mongeau Hughes placed second in the 'feature personality' category of the ONPA's contest for their profile of Portland mayor Keith Wilson.

In 2024, Kavanaugh moderated a mayoral debate on KGW.

Kavanaugh has been the co-chair on the board of the Portland Insight Meditation Community.

== See also ==
- List of City University of New York alumni
