= 2016 Portland, Oregon, riots =

Riots in Portland, Oregon

2016 Portland, Oregon protests
- Part of the protests against Donald Trump
- Protests in Portland, November 10–12, 2016
- Date: November 10–12, 2016
- Location: Portland, Oregon, U.S.
- Caused by: Reaction to the election of Donald Trump as president
- Methods: Protests, vandalism, Rioting

Parties
Portland Police Bureau	Local demonstrators

Number
	4,000

Casualties
- Injuries: 4
- Arrested: 113

On November 10, 2016, three days of protests in Portland, Oregon, turned into a riot, when a group of anarchists broke off from a larger group of protesters who were opposed to the election of Donald Trump as president of the United States.

== Riots ==
A number of businesses were damaged, and 26–29 people were arrested during the first day of the incident. Police used rubber bullets, pepper spray and flash bang devices to disperse the protesters who became violent. During the riot, glass bottles and trash cans were thrown at police. Rioters used rocks and baseball bats to cause much of the damage. A dumpster was also lit on fire. Members of the protest who opposed the violence intervened when a man tried to destroy a piece of electrical equipment with a bat. Another altercation began when a woman began throwing laundry detergent at people in the crowd.

The riot spread from the Downtown area, into the Pearl District, where additional businesses were vandalized. At 10:00 p.m., police told protesters who had not returned to Pioneer Courthouse Square that they would face arrest. Authorities also closed local stretches of Interstate 5 (I-5) and I-84 as a precaution, and warned motorists to watch for people in roadways.

On November 11, the next day, protests continued. Police used flash bangs to disperse crowds until nearly midnight, including one group in front of City Hall. Police made several additional arrests throughout the day. Early the next morning, several people in a vehicle on the Morrison Bridge got into an argument with a protester. A man exited the vehicle, and shot the protester before escaping; the injured man's wounds were not considered life-threatening. Police later arrested four men in relation to the shooting, and charged two of them with attempted murder. Police seized a TEC-9 semi-automatic pistol that was found in the suspects' vehicle.

The protests remained ongoing into the night of November 12. Police arrested nineteen additional protesters who either refused to leave the area, or were suspected of other crimes. A reporter for local television station KOIN was assaulted. In reaction to the ongoing disturbances, police closed Pioneer Courthouse Square and a two-block perimeter around the park, and warned that anyone who remained would face arrest. Two other people were also assaulted, and a total of 62 people have been arrested as a result of the rioting and other disturbances. On November 13, police updated the figure of total arrests to 113, with 71 arrested on November 12 alone. Protesters reportedly threw lit road flares at police officers.

== Damage and aftermath ==
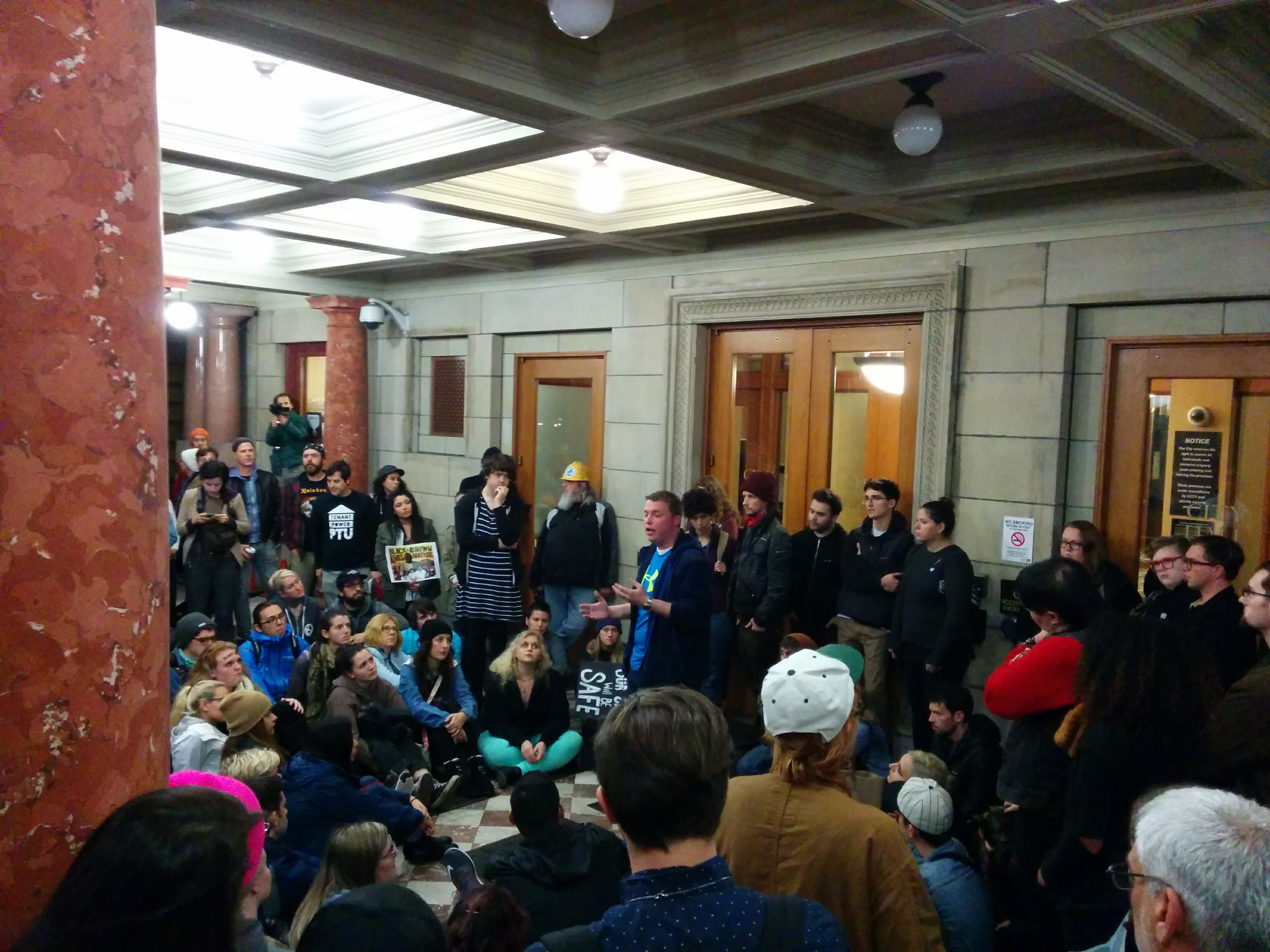
Demonstrators at Portland City Hall on November 11, 2016

Numerous businesses were damaged during the rioting. Windows of a Chase Bank, a Starbucks, and many other privately owned shops were smashed. Twelve vehicles at a Toyota dealership, across the Willamette River, had windows smashed out, and roofs caved in. Anti-Trump graffiti was spray painted on buildings downtown. By the fourth day of the riots, Portland police chief Mike Marshman estimated that damages exceeded $1 million. In addition, the cost to the City of Portland exceeded $500,000 in police overtime alone. This cost does not include use of, or damage to, police ammunition, equipment or other property. Police used postings on social media to track down vandals with numerous arrests made in the days following the riots.

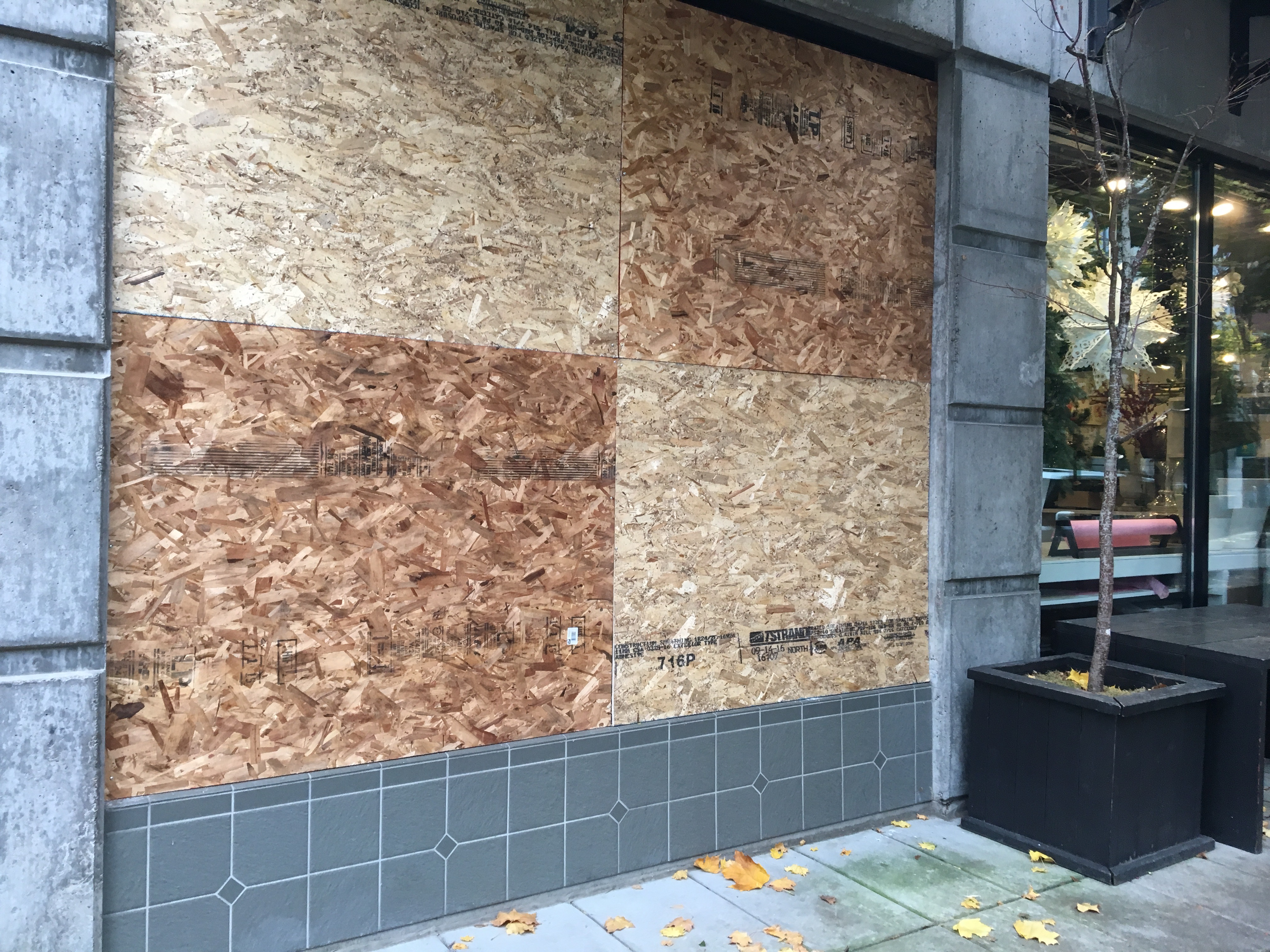
Boarded windows of a store after the riots, November 13, 2016

The Multnomah County District Attorney's Office announced it would not be prosecuting some of the people arrested during the riots, although all 113 arrested were given a criminal citation for failing to obey a police officer, along with a class B traffic violation that carries a presumptive fine of $260. Detectives and prosecutors will continue to investigate and have three years to file felony charges.

== Reaction ==
Portland Mayor Charlie Hales said that while he supports the right of citizens to peacefully protest, he condemned the violence and warned protesters to stay out of traffic.

KGW compiled a list of the 112 people arrested during the riots and compared them to state voter logs. They found that at least 79 of the arrested rioters either didn't turn in a ballot or weren't registered to vote in the state.

== See also ==
- List of incidents of civil unrest in the United States
