= 2014 May Day protests =

International economic protests

- Date: 1 May 2014
- Location: Worldwide
- Caused by: Austerity measures; Poor working conditions; Tax hikes; Low wages; Unemployment
- Methods: Demonstration; Occupation; Protest march; Civil disobedience; Rioting
- Status: Ended

Parties
Skilled and unskilled workers Trade unionists	Police officers Gendarmes

Number
Millions: 2,000,000 in Russia; 300,000 in Italy; 100,000 in France; 50,000 in Malaysia; 33,000 in Indonesia; 20,000 in Greece; 15,000 in Germany; 14,000 in Switzerland; 10,000 in Taiwan; Tens of thousands in Morocco and Ukraine; 5,000 in Hong Kong and South Korea; 3,000 in Venezuela; 1,000 in Cambodia; Thousands in Argentina, Bangladesh, Chile, Iran, Philippines, Portugal, Spain, Turkey, United Kingdom and United States; 400 in Singapore; Hundreds in Armenia and Serbia; Dozens in Iraq	40,000 in Istanbul; 18,000 in Jakarta; Hundreds in Phnom Penh

Casualties
- Deaths: 2
- Injuries: 90 in Istanbul; 5 in Phnom Penh
- Arrested: 142 in Istanbul

The 2014 May Day protests were a series of international protests involving millions of people that took place worldwide on May Day (1 May 2014) over the ongoing global economic crisis including austerity measures and poor working conditions.

== Africa ==
=== Morocco ===
Tens of thousands of Moroccans marched demanding better wages and condemning a new 10 percent salary hike to the minimum wage in the private sector as insufficient.

== Asia ==
=== Bangladesh ===
Thousands of workers in Bangladesh, including many from garment factories, took to the streets demanding the execution for the owner of a building that collapsed last year, killing more than 1,100 laborers in the worst disaster the garment industry had seen.

=== Cambodia ===
Nearly 1,000 factory workers and supporters of the opposition Cambodia National Rescue Party gathered outside the Phnom Penh's Freedom Park, which had been sealed off with barbed wire with hundreds of police on guard. At least five people were injured after security forces armed with sticks and batons turned on protesters.

=== Hong Kong ===
According to organisers, up to 5,000 workers in Hong Kong joined the Labor Day march, calling for improved working conditions and for the government to restrict the number of working hours.

=== Indonesia ===
A major protest was held in Jakarta, where 33,000 people marched peacefully through the city centre. According to Rikwanto, police spokesman, 18,000 police officers were deployed on the streets to avoid conflicts.

=== Iran ===
Iranian President Hassan Rouhani told thousands of laborers gathered to celebrate International Workers' Day in the capital, Tehran, that he supports the establishment of unions "free of any interference by the state".

=== Iraq ===
Dozens of people, mostly members of the Iraqi Communist Party, held a rally near the party headquarters in downtown Baghdad, raising Iraqi flags and those of the former Soviet Union.

=== Malaysia ===
Thousands of Malaysians held a peaceful protest on the streets of Dataran Merdeka, in downtown Kuala Lumpur, against a looming goods and services tax that they fear will increase the cost of living. During the protest, there were reported several minor scuffles started by fringe youth groups.

=== Philippines ===
In the Philippines, thousands of workers marched peacefully in Manila to protest low wages and employers' practice of replacing regular employees with temporary hires who get low pay and little or no benefits. They also decried what they said was the failure of President Benigno Aquino III to deliver on his anti-corruption and pro-poor reforms.

=== Taiwan ===
More than 10,000 workers marched to the labor ministry in Taiwan's capital Taipei demanding wage hikes and a ban on companies hiring cheap temporary or part-time workers.

=== Turkey ===
Police intervened with water cannons and tear gas to disperse hundreds of demonstrators that tried to defy the interdiction to meet on 1 May in Taksim Square, Istanbul, emblematic for anti-government protests in Turkey. Riot police assaulted, using vehicles equipped with water cannons, demonstrators who tried to force the barrages in Beşiktaş district to reach the neighboring Taksim Square. Areas around the European centre of Turkish metropolis were transformed into fortified camp and tens of thousands of police officers – up to 40,000 according to Turkish media – were mobilized to prevent access. According to the Istanbul Governor's Office, at least 142 protesters have been detained by police and 90 people, 19 of whom are police officers, have been injured during the protests. Similar demonstrations took place in more than 30 provinces of Turkey, including the capital Ankara.

== Europe ==
=== France ===
According to authorities, nearly 100,000 people attended the Labor Day rallies in France, with the biggest rallies in Paris and other major cities such as Bordeaux and Toulouse. The demonstrations targeted the savings plan of 50 billion euros announced by Prime Minister Manuel Valls.

=== Greece ===
Nearly 20,000 Greeks marked May Day by demonstrating against government reforms which they say have hurt workers through layoffs and wage cuts.

=== Italy ===
In Turin, scuffles broke out between police and hundreds of protesters. Activists lobbed smoke bombs at police, who charged demonstrators in the northern industrial city, which has been badly hit by a two-year recession. It was less violent in Rome, where 300,000 people packed into a huge, free May Day concert organized by trade unions. Thousands of people also took part in a peaceful demonstration called by the main trade unions in Pordenone near Venice, where the closure of a nearby washing machine plant owned by Sweden's Electrolux has put 1,300 jobs at risk.

=== Russia ===
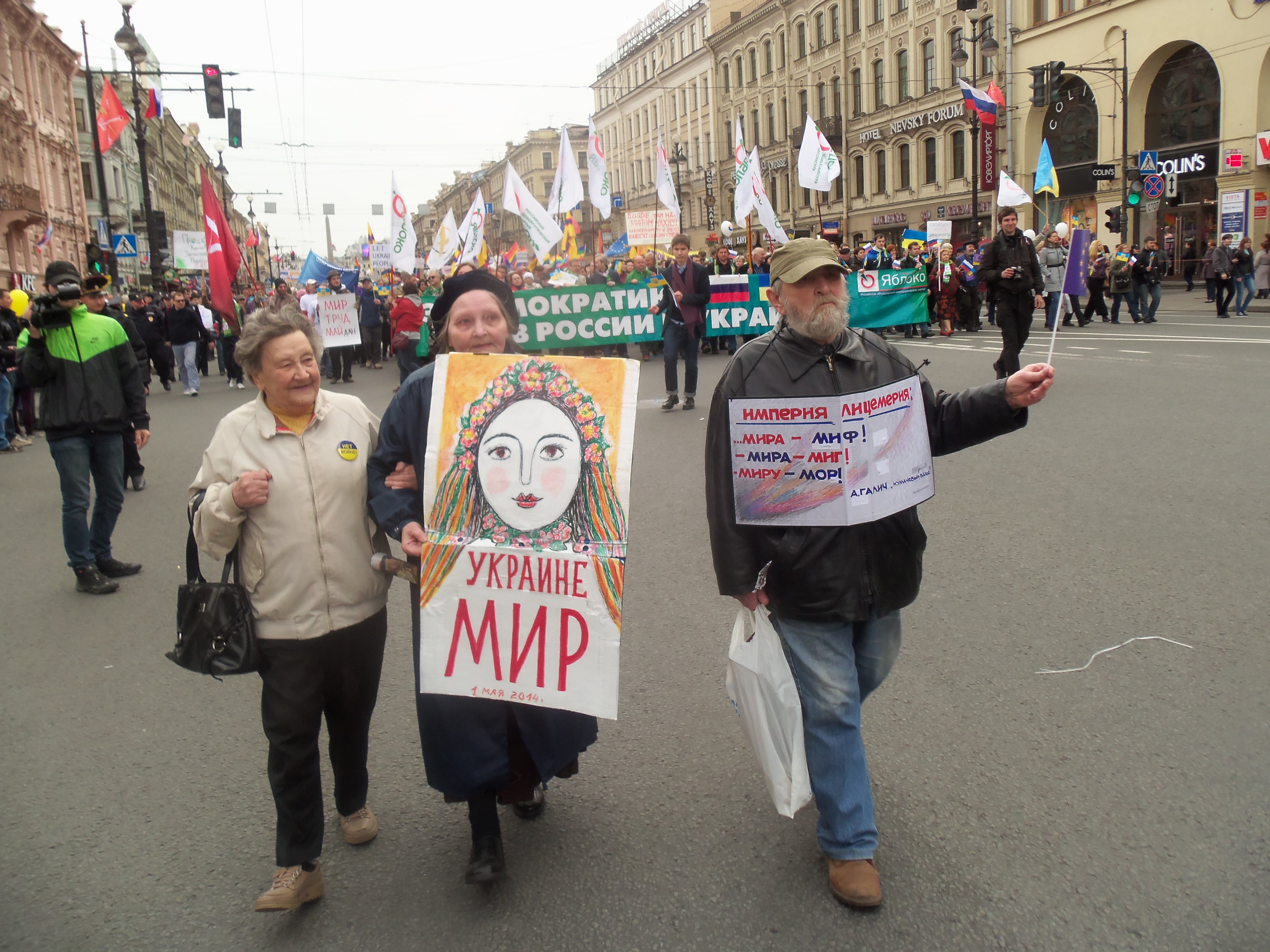
In Saint Petersburg, the May Day rally turned into a protest against Russian military intervention in Ukraine.

Over 100,000 attended a protest march from the Red Square to the State Historical Museum in Moscow, reviving a tradition last seen before the collapse of the Soviet Union in 1991. The event was organized by the Federation of Independent Trade Unions of Russia. Labour union organisers said that a total of 2 million people had attended similar rallies around the country.

=== Serbia ===
Various labour groups staged a protest in Belgrade in order to voice their concern over the expected austerity measures announced by Serbia's new government.

=== Spain ===
Rallies were held in more than 70 Spanish cities. In Madrid, thousands marched through the city centre waving signs demanding an end to austerity measure and criticising the government over a perceived lack of focus on job creation.

=== Switzerland ===
In Switzerland's financial capital Zurich, about 14,000 people turned out in support of a move to fix the minimum wage at 4,000 Swiss francs ($4,500, €3,300) which will be put to a referendum this month.

=== Ukraine ===
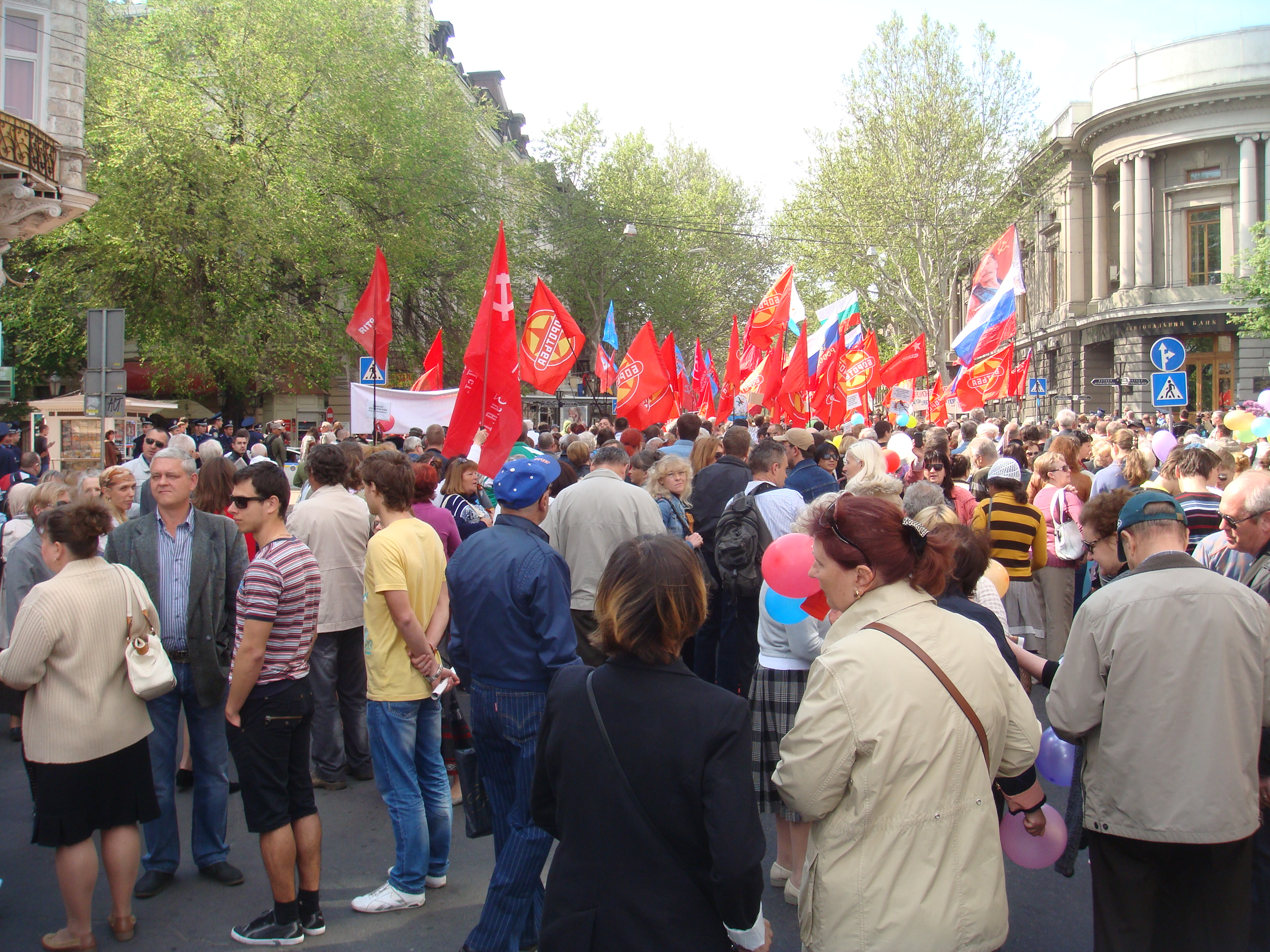
May Day demonstration in Odesa

In Odesa, May Day rallies have turned into anti-government protests. Clashes have broken out between protesters and police in Donetsk as separatists attempted to storm the prosecutor's office.

=== United Kingdom ===
Thousands of activists attended a May Day rally in honour of veteran political campaigner Tony Benn and rail union leader Bob Crow who died within days of each other in March.

== North America ==
=== United States ===
Thousands of community advocates and immigrant rights supporters marched for worker rights and immigrant justice in downtown Los Angeles. Three different May Day marches were planned by three different groups. As a result of the marches, some downtown streets were closed.

== See also ==
- List of protests in the 21st century
