= Timothy Shortell =

Timothy Shortell is an associate professor of sociology at the City University of New York, known for his critiques of religion, especially Christianity, and of the administration of President George W. Bush.

Shortell is the son of a 1960s political activist, Brandon Shortell, and Linda Shortell née LaPlante. He began his academic career at Washington State University where he graduated in psychology in 1987, before moving to Boston College to graduate in social psychology in 1992. Following this, Shortell focused on the relationship between religion and cultural beliefs, comparing the beliefs of Protestants and Catholics in the United States for Smith College in 1995.

Shortell first came to public notice two years later when, having moved to Brooklyn College, he became Assistant Professor of Sociology and wrote the article, "Religious Affiliation, Commitment and Ideology Among US Elites" in which he continued his first major article from 1995. He then wrote about the influence of religion in El Salvador during the era when Óscar Romero fought against the military junta, before moving onto a series of controversial articles between 2002 and 2004 in which he argued that morality in any form is totally incompatible with religion.

Shortell is writing a book about the responses to Darwinism from its origins until today.

== Selected articles ==
- "African-American Abolitionism as a Human Rights Discourse" in Human Rights and the Media: Volume 6, Studies in Communications, edited by Diana Papademas.
- "The Decline of the Public Sphere: A Semiotic Analysis of the Rhetoric of Race in New York City". pp 159–177 in Race and Ethnicity in New York City (Research in Urban Sociology, Volume Seven), edited by Jerome Krase and Ray Hutchinson.
- "The Rhetoric of Black Abolitionism: an Exploratory Analysis Of Anti-Slavery Newspapers In New York State" in Social Science History. 28(1):75-109.
