= 2009 May Day protests =

Series of international protests

The 2009 May Day protests were a series of international protests that took place across Europe, Asia and in the other parts of the world due to the 2008 financial crisis and the resulting Great Recession. Several May Day marches, which are traditional events, had turned violent in Germany, Turkey and Venezuela as riot police battled protesters in their respective countries. Banks and shops had been attacked in Turkey.

Further marches had taken place in Russia, Ukraine, the Philippines, Japan and Hong Kong, Cuba, Italy and Spain.

== Americas ==
=== Canada ===
Approximately 1,000 radicals and anti-capitalists demonstrated peacefully in front of the Caisse de dépôt et placement du Québec building in Montreal. In 2009, the Service de police de la Ville de Montréal didn't intervene with riot police to disperse violently the demonstration like it did in 2008.

=== United States ===
In San Francisco, more than 50 people rioted through Union Square and the financial district, attacking upper-class storefronts.

=== Venezuela ===
Parallel marches consisting pro- and anti-government unions and organizations took place around the country. An opposition protest of a few thousand in the capital was dispersed with tear gas, rubber bullets and water cannons, after organizers expressed their intentions to pass through the barricades, set up several blocks away from the National Assembly -the opposition's intended destination- to deliver a document denouncing supposed actions against labor unions by the Chávez government. Once dispersed, marchers damaged a Pdval food distribution point.

== Asia ==
=== Cambodia ===
Over 1,000 textile and hotel workers marched through Phnom Penh to the location of Chea Vichea's 2004 assassination. Vichea led Cambodia's biggest labour union before he was killed in January that year.

=== Hong Kong ===
Several hundred workers marched peacefully through Hong Kong in protest against job cuts and reduced working hours. Two protests were organised by pro-government and opposition labour unions.

=== Japan ===
In Japan, approximately 36,000 people demonstrated about social welfare benefits in Tokyo's Yoyogi Park. Some people also protested high military spending, about US$48.8 billion in 2008.

=== Macao ===
Protesters (500 according to organizers, 400 according to police) marched to the Government House on issues such as illegal workers and public housing. With the election of the Chief Executive approaching, some protesters raised the banner "Against Businessmen Ruling Macao".

=== South Korea ===
8,000 workers and students participated in a rally in a park in Seoul, calling for an end to layoffs and wage cuts.

=== Taiwan ===
Despite clashes between protesters and police in Taipei, no arrests were reported. In one of the largest May Day protests there in recent times, 10,000 people marched against record high levels of unemployment nearing 6%.

== Europe ==
=== Austria ===
A large crowd gathered at Vienna's city hall. According to the Social Democratic Party of Austria, 100,000 people attended the rally. On the Ringstraße, a march organized by the KPÖ (the Communist Party of Austria) took place. Some three to five hundred people showed up. The final rally was held in front of the parliament. There were also other minor marches in Vienna. At a march in Linz, also organized by the KPÖ, police and protesters clashed. On both sides, people were injured. Five people were arrested.

=== France ===
France's eight major trade unions decided to unite in their May Day rallies for the first time since the end of World War II. Several tens of thousands of people marched in three hundred protests through cities such as Bordeaux, Grenoble, Marseille and Paris. One of Grenoble's Schaeffler worker banners said, "Work, not death". Fishermen, hospital and university staff engaged in strike action.

=== Germany ===
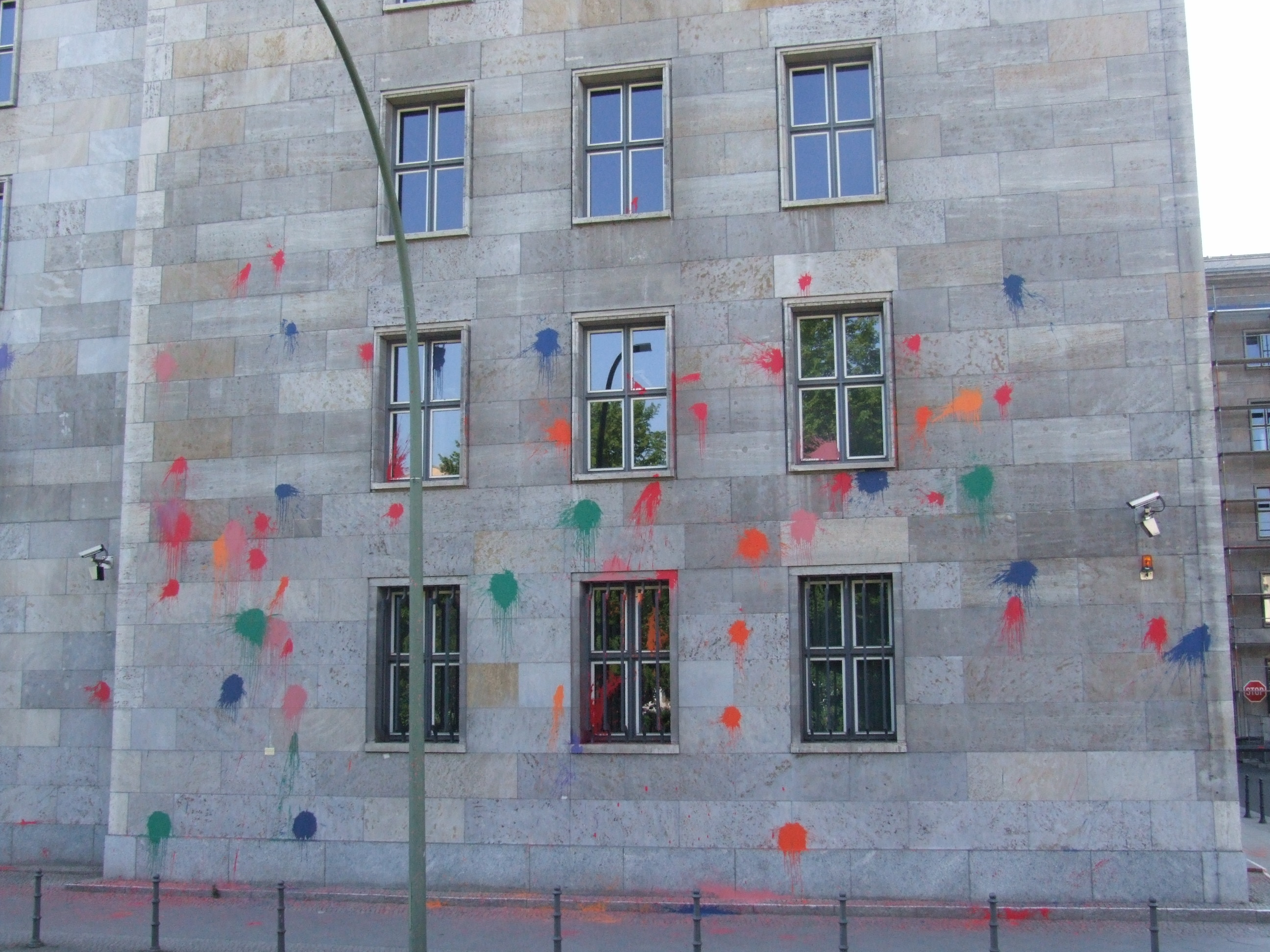
The German Federal Ministry of Finance in Berlin was pelted with paint bombs.

Violence was expected among far right and far left demonstrators and police. German police arrested twelve people after twenty-nine police were injured by two hundred protesters shouting anti-capitalist slogans in Berlin. Forty-nine demonstrators were arrested after several incidents involving bottle-throwing, rock-throwing, and setting fires. Between Berlin and Hamburg, over fifty riot police were injured.

=== Iceland ===
The turnout at the May Day rally in Reykjavík was double the number seen the many last years. Activists from the January uprising, along with anarchists brandishing anarcho-communist flags, booed at Gylfi Arnbjörnsson, the leader of the main trade union in Iceland, as he suggested in his speech that Iceland enter the EU.

=== Italy ===
L'Aquila was the central meeting point of a rally held by union leaders following a deadly earthquake.

=== Russia ===
In Moscow, approximately 2,000 Communists gathered at a statue of Karl Marx. Police arrested around one hundred members of far right and anti-immigrant demonstrators counter-protesting in Saint Petersburg.

=== Spain ===
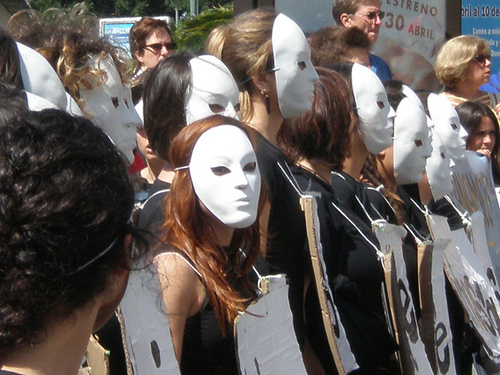
Demonstrators in Málaga, Spain

In protests organized by UGT and CCOO, some of Spain's largest unions, more than 10 thousand demonstrators collected in the centre of Madrid.

=== Turkey ===
At least eight people, including two police, were injured as police in Istanbul attempted to disperse hundreds of demonstrators with tear gas and water cannons. Several hundred protesters dispersed authorities with rocks in the Şişli central district. The demonstrators chanted slogans such as "hand in hand against fascism", "repression won't stop us" and "long live the revolution and socialism". The Turkish government bowed to trade union pressure and declared May Day a public holiday.

== Africa ==
=== Kenya ===
A government official was forced to cut short his speech and abandon the May Day rally as angry workers hurled stones at dignitaries in protest over the government's refusal to deal with difficult living conditions

== See also ==
- 2012 May Day protests
