= Mirko Savone =

Italian voice actor

Mirko Savone is an Italian actor.

== Biography ==
Born in Frosinone in 1985, Savone started acting onstage at the age of 6. He graduated in music, piano and voice at The Conservatory “Licino Refice” when he was 17 years old. The following year he took part in the popular Italian TV show Macao (RAI 2) as a dancer.

As a voice actor, Savone has dubbed Christian Bale in The Secret Agent and Elijah Wood in Oliver Twist in Italian, and characters in TV series and cartoons for Disney Channel, Nickelodeon and other National Channels. He has directed movies and TV series for Disney Channel (of which he was the official Italian announcer from 1996 to 2000), RAI and Mediaset.

After acting in the play Germania 99, written and directed by Gigliola Fantoni (Ettore Scola's wife), he moved to New York City where he studied at the Lee Strasberg Theatre and Film Institute and worked in Off-Broadway plays such as Crossing Rockaway Parkway, with Jonathan Chase and Brooklyn Sudano, and independent films.

He speaks four languages (Italian, English, Spanish, and Turkish) and is a graduate Columbia University in the City of New York. He currently works at Pfizer and Bristol Myers Squibb as an Epidemiologist.
