= 2015 May Day protests =

International protests over austerity and poor working conditions

- Part of May Day protests and Anti-austerity movement
- Date: 1 May 2015
- Location: Worldwide
- Caused by: Austerity measures; Poor working conditions; Tax hikes; Low wages; Unemployment
- Methods: Demonstration; Occupation; Protest march; Civil disobedience

Parties
Skilled and unskilled workers; Trade unionists	Government authorities

Number
Tens of thousands (Istanbul); 30,000 (Milan); Tens of thousands (Seoul); 20,000 (Maldives)	20,000 police (Istanbul)

Casualties
- Injuries: 24 (Istanbul)
- Arrested: 203 (Istanbul); +20 (Milan)

The 2015 May Day protests were a series of international protests involving tens of thousands of people that took place worldwide on May Day (1 May 2015) over austerity measures and poor working conditions.

== Locations ==
=== Italy ===
Protests in Milan were primarily peaceful with about 30,000 demonstrators attending according to organizers and denounced the Expo 2015 meeting. Some protests were violent with about 500 individuals equipped with motorcycle helmets and batons gathered near Piazza XXIV Maggio far from the Expo 15 convention. Violent protesters clashed with police, torched several vehicles and a few business, broke windows of shops and threw homemade explosives at some businesses.

=== Maldives ===
After Mohamed Nasheed was sentenced to thirteen years at Maafushi Prison for terrorism, an opposition alliance consisting of the Maldivian Democratic Party, Adhaalath Party, and the Jumhooree Party, launched a campaign to protest during May Day.

An estimate of 20,000 people protested in the capital, Malé. Police beat protesters and used pepper spray and batons against them. They arrested all three opposition leaders—Imran Abdulla, Ali Waheed, and Ameen Ibrahim. 193 people were arrested, with 69 being freed and 30 charged.

=== South Korea ===
Tens of thousands of protesters gathered in Seoul and threatened a "general strike" if the government performed the planned labor reforms.

=== Turkey ===
Authorities blocked access to Taksim Square by blocking transportation routes and dispersed protesters with water cannons and tears gas. It was estimated by Turkish media that 20,000 police were sent out with 62 water cannon trucks and 203 individuals involved in the Istanbul protests were arrested.

=== United States ===
An annual protest march was held in Seattle for numerous causes, such as immigrant rights, labor rights, and solidarity with the 2015 Baltimore protests. The originally peaceful protests turned violent later in the day when a group of self-described anarchists began smashing windows, burning trash cans, and clashing with riot police. Five officers ultimately suffered injuries, while sixteen people were arrested for property destruction and assault of police officers.
