= 2017 May Day protests =

Worker and immigrant rights protests

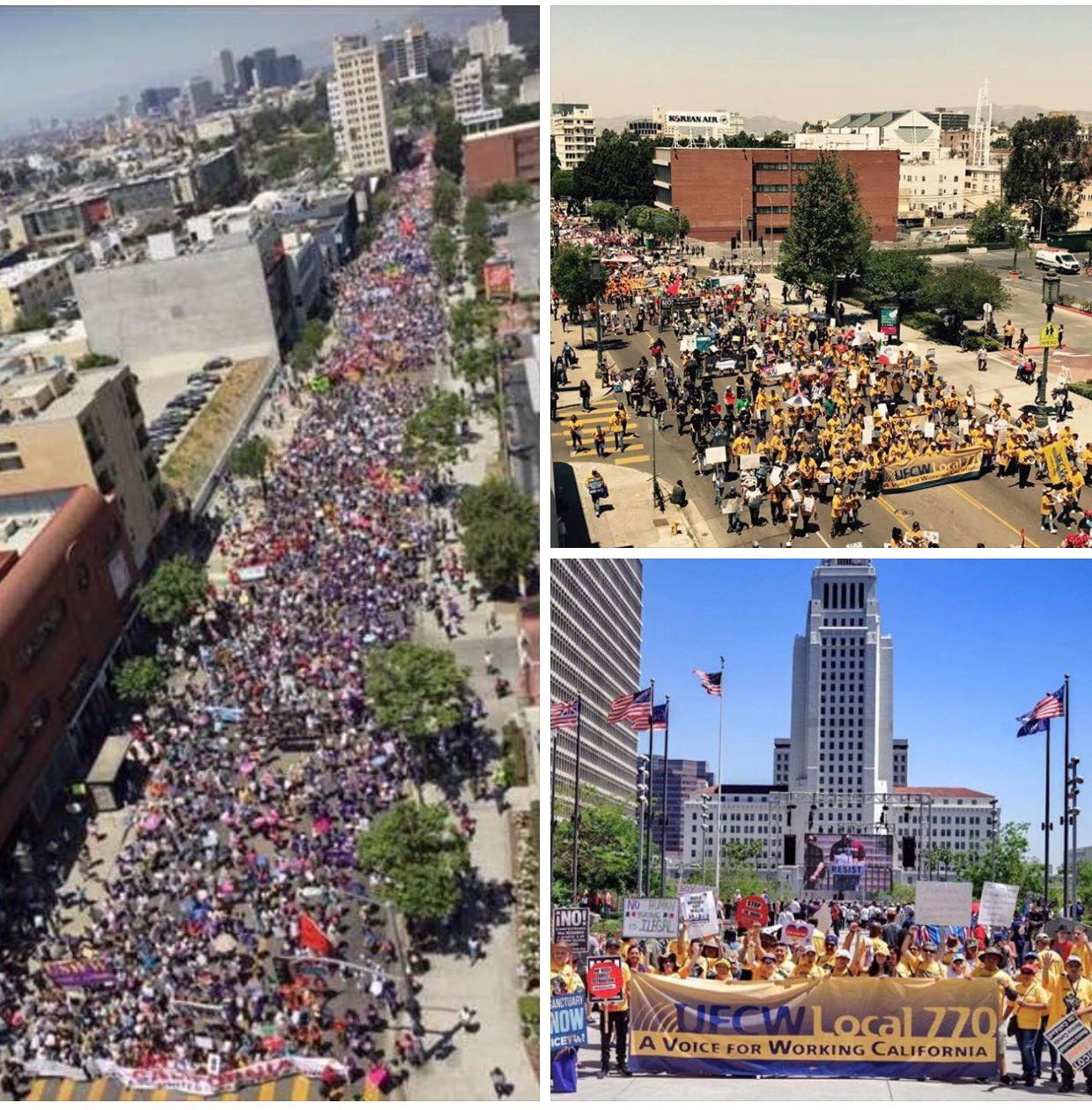
Protesters in Los Angeles

The 2017 May Day protests were a series of protests that took place on May Day (May 1, 2017) over worker and immigrant rights, throughout the United States and around the world. Protests became violent in Olympia, Washington, and Portland, Oregon. Many demonstrators were protesting against the policies of President Donald Trump, specifically those related to immigration.

== Locations ==
=== United States ===
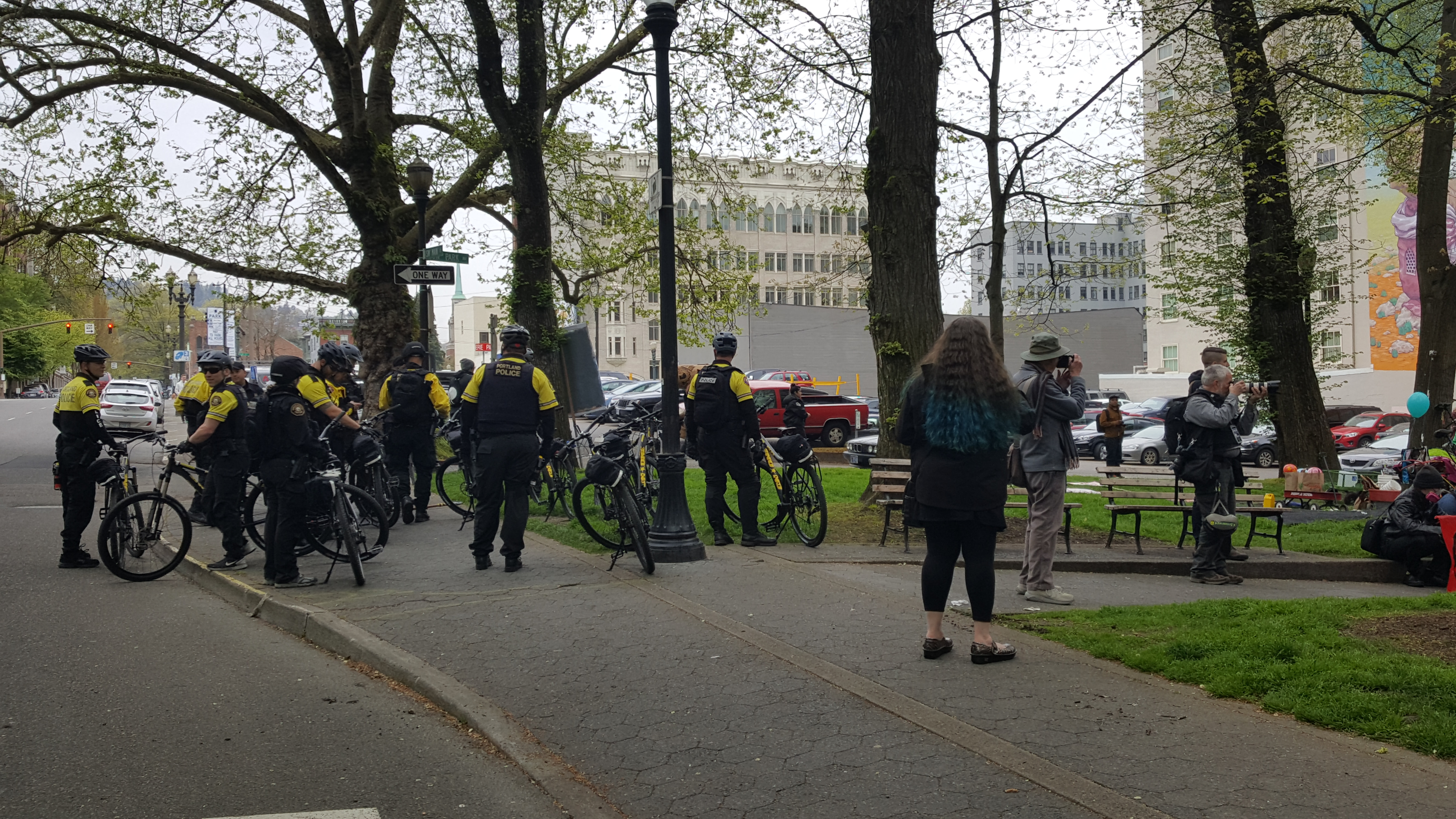
Police officers monitoring the rally in Portland, Oregon

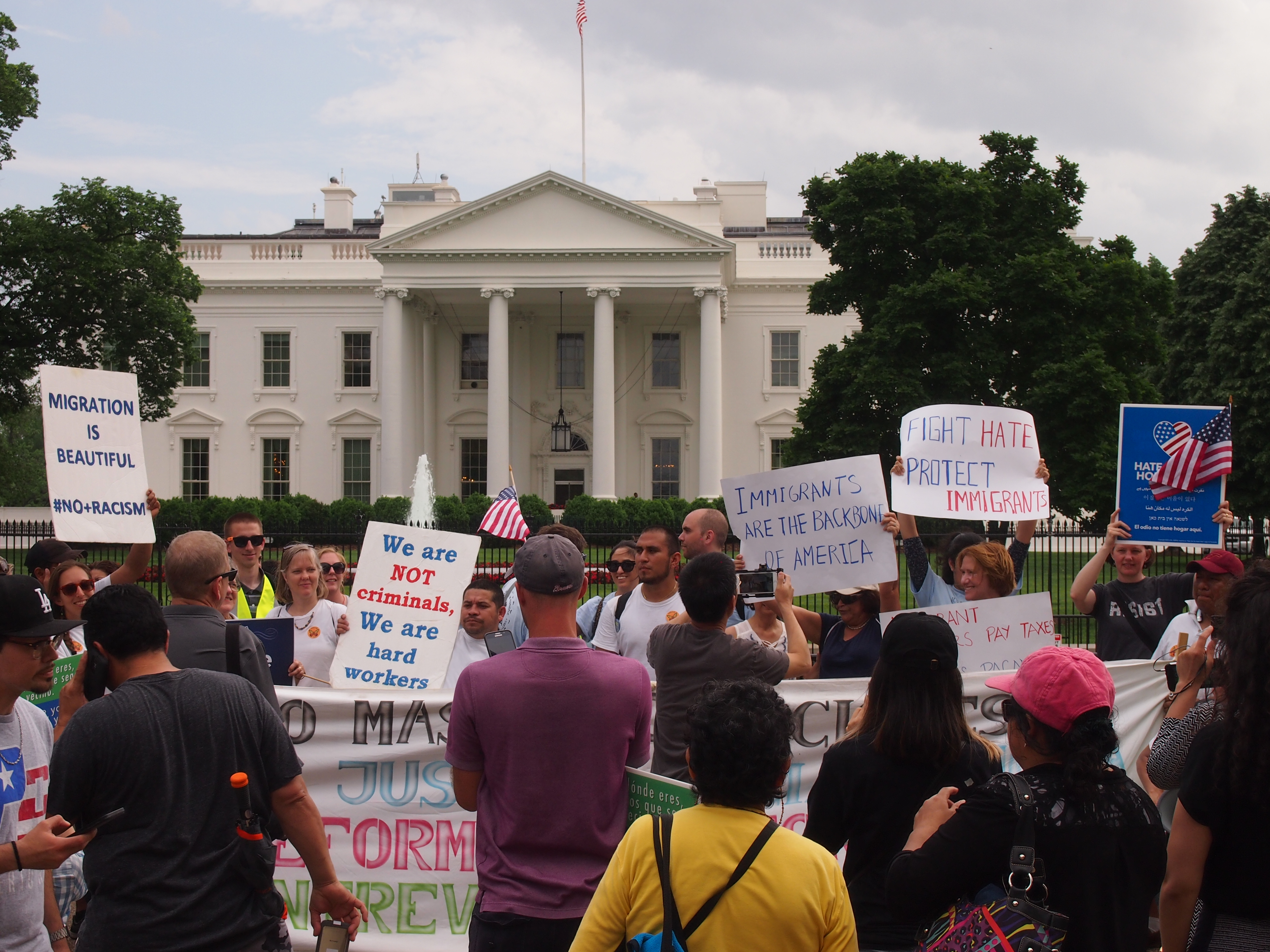
Protestors at the May Day Action Immigrants and Workers March in Washington, D.C.

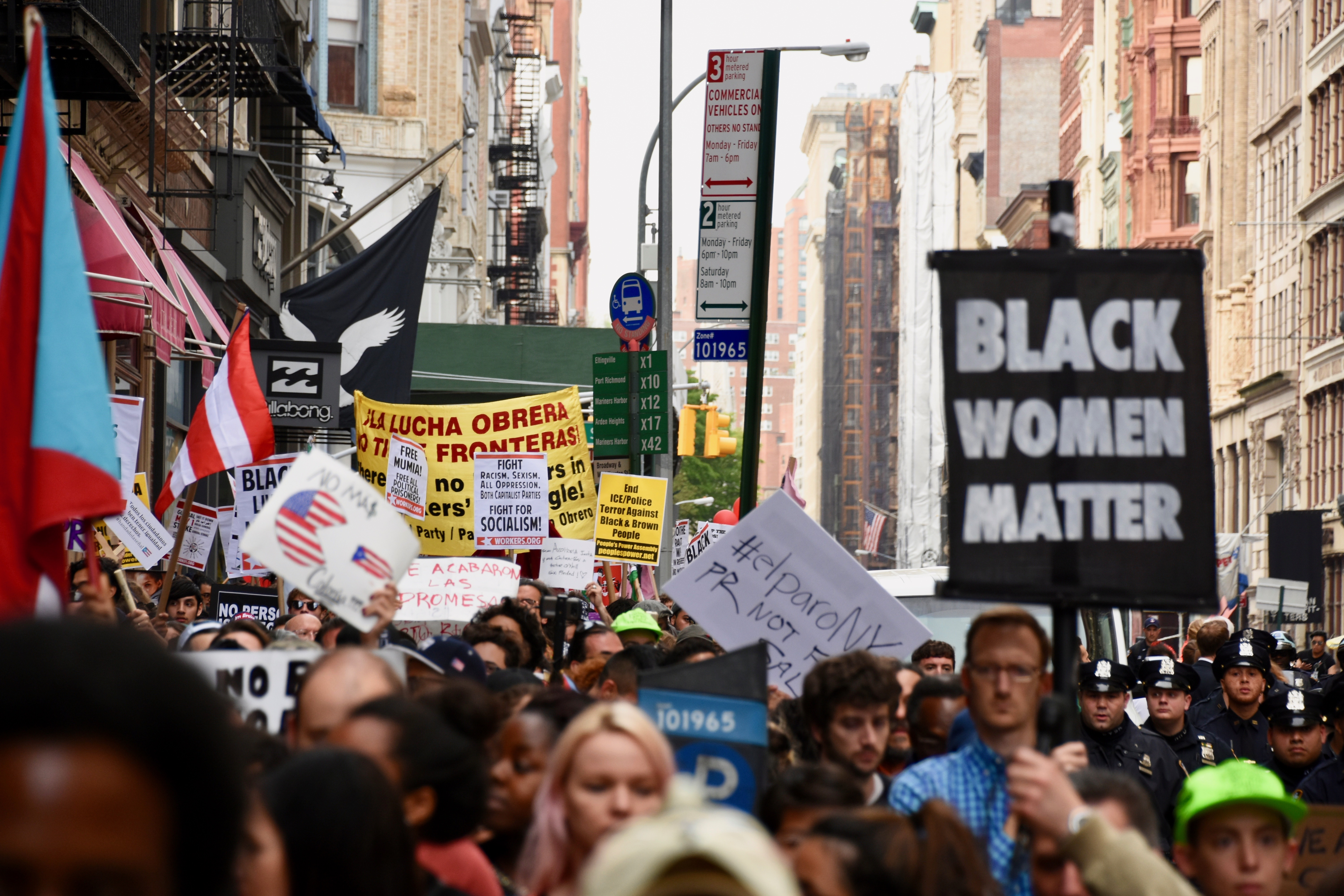
May Day 2017 in New York City

The protests occurred in several major cities, including Chicago, Detroit, Las Vegas, Los Angeles, Miami, New York City, Philadelphia, San Francisco, Seattle, and Washington, D.C. Protesters against deportation held a sit-in at the office of Texas governor Greg Abbott in Austin, and blocked the driveway of the Immigration and Customs Enforcement office in San Francisco. In New York City, twelve protesters were arrested for civil disobedience after blocking the entrance to the Manhattan JPMorgan building. In Oakland, California, four people were arrested for trespassing at an Alameda County government building.

In Denver, a rally began in the city's Civic Center Park before a vigil occurred outside of a for-profit detention center in Aurora owned by GEO Group, which at the time was the second-largest operator of for-profit prisons and facing lawsuits representing 62,000 of their detainees for being threatened with solitary confinement.

The protests in Olympia, Washington and Portland, Oregon turned violent and were classified as riots by police. In Portland, protesters allegedly threw lead balls, smoke bombs, paint, glass bottles, and cans of Pepsi at officers. There were multiple cases of property damage and arson. This resulted in 25 arrests and the cancellation of the protest permit. In Olympia, black-clad protesters shattered windows, and threw smoke-issuing devices and rocks at police. Some of the 50 protesters in Olympia had signs reading "delete the port" and broke windows in the Downtown Historic District. Several storefronts suffered damage. Nine police officers were injured by thrown rocks, and nine protesters were arrested.

Protests also occurred in the following cities:

- Concord, California
- Durham, North Carolina
- Fortuna, California
- Grand Rapids, Michigan
- Lansing, Michigan
- Minneapolis
- Nashville, Tennessee
- Phoenix, Arizona
- Pontiac, Michigan
- Riverside, California

=== Outside the United States ===
International protests occurred in Havana, Cuba; Istanbul; Moscow, Russia; Paris, France; the Philippines; Pristina, Kosovo; Saint Petersburg, Russia; and Tbilisi, Georgia. The protests in Paris, which were held over immigration and labor rights, as well as the 2017 French presidential election, turned violent when Black Bloc protesters joined the protests and began clashing with police, throwing rocks, bricks, concrete, Molotov cocktails, and firebombs. French police clashed with the violent rioters throughout the day, and at least six officers were injured, with some suffering severe burns from firebombs and Molotov cocktails.

== See also ==
- Port Militarization Resistance
