= Vortex 2020 =

- Date: August 22–23, 2020
- Location: Milo McIver State Park, Oregon, U.S.

Vortex 2020, or Vortex2020, was a planned music festival scheduled to be held in the U.S. state of Oregon in 2020, fifty years after Vortex I. The event was to be held on August 22–23 at Milo McIver State Park, near Estacada.

Slated performers included Blind Pilot, Storm Large, Pink Martini, The Dandy Warhols, and Gus Van Sant.

The original festival was a collaboration between local peace activists and Oregon's Republican governor, concerned about the chaos that could arise around a planned Nixon visit to the state.

The 2020 event was postponed because of the COVID-19 pandemic in Oregon.
