= Judge Dave and the Rainbow People =

Judge Dave and the Rainbow People is a book by US Federal Judge David B. Sentelle about his involvement with the 1987 annual Rainbow Gathering.

The gathering was held in North Carolina where Sentelle was a U.S. District court judge. The State tried to prohibit the gathering because the Rainbow family failed to acquire a permit for the event. Sentelle's book is a humorous first person narrative about the event.

North Carolina's permitting law was intended for large commercial events and primarily to ensure public safety. The Rainbows satisfied most of the safety requirements but, as an amorphous group with no leadership structure, were unable to comply with the bonding requirements. Additionally, the Rainbows had a long history of eschewing any permitting process as an infringement on their First Amendment rights to assemble and practice their religion.

Judge Sentelle (and Garrick Beck, in a postscript) explained the conflict as having no easy solution; if Sentelle granted the state a restraining order to shut down the gathering, the Rainbows' first amendment rights would be violated. On the other hand, if the Judge allowed it to proceed it would undermine the State's permitting law, which was intended for public safety at large commercial events. Furthermore, the Pullman doctrine prohibited federal judges from invalidating state laws except in case of emergency, which was the pretense under which the case landed in his court.

Sentelle solved the conflict by getting the two groups to agree to a consent judgment, whereby the court wouldn't have to invalidate the state law, and whereby the Rainbows wouldn't need a permit, as long as they met the safety and environmental requirements as detailed in the agreement.

The book includes several humorous trips by the court to the gathering, including a jury view and some later inspections. Sentelle recounts the discomfort he felt at being videotaped while chatting with a pretty nude female hippie, and the effect it might have on his upcoming confirmation hearings to the United States Court of Appeals. He also talks of an elephant roaming around the North Carolina forest and an almost mythical Shanti Sena (Rainbow peace keeper) who seemed to appear out of thin air anytime there was trouble.

Sentelle also documents the complicated relationship between the Rainbows and law enforcement officers, who generally didn't interfere with the gathering, except in cases of blatant misbehavior. There were undercover agents at the event, but they would turn a blind eye to minor infractions, like recreational drug use, looking instead for dangerous situations or criminals who might be at the gathering. When a wanted person was observed the undercover agents would communicate the identity to uniformed agents, who would then ask the Shanti Sena to produce the person. This method avoided public confrontation between the Rainbows and law enforcement. The Shanti Sena produced all the criminals the authorities identified, including one who was allegedly delivered in an unconscious condition.

Throughout the book Sentelle portrays the Rainbows management in a positive light: all kitchens had proper sanitation; the first aid station was staffed with nurses and physicians, latrines were to Marine specifications (minus the privacy screens); water supply and disposal was environmentally sound, and the group completed a comprehensive cleanup and restoration after the gathering. Cases of dysentery, however, caused by shigellosis appeared in some attendees, who apparently failed to boil the water per instructions at the water supplies. In some ways the site was left better than before the gathering, as the rainbows hauled pre-existing garbage out of the forest. Other areas were damaged by soil compaction and the forest service required heavy equipment to aerate the soil.
