= The Third Rainbow Girl =

2020 book by Emma Copley Eisenberg

The Third Rainbow Girl: The Long Life of a Double Murder in Appalachia
- Hardcover edition
- Author: Emma Copley Eisenberg
- Cover artist: Roger May
- Language: English
- Genre: Nonfiction, True crime, Memoir
- Publisher: Hachette Books
- Publication date: January 21, 2020
- Publication place: United States
- Media type: Print (hardcover, paperback), Audio
- ISBN: 9780316449236

The Third Rainbow Girl: The Long Life of a Double Murder in Appalachia is a non-fiction book by Emma Copley Eisenberg, published January 21, 2020 by Hachette Books. The book follows the investigation of the murders of Vicki Durian and Nancy Santomero and provides commentary on how people in Appalachia are viewed.

== Plot ==
The Third Rainbow Girl follows the true story of the murders of Vicki Durian and Nancy Santomero in Pocahontas County, West Virginia in June 1980 when the duo had been hitchhiking to the Rainbow Gathering. Though no one was prosecuted for the "Rainbow Murders" for 13 years, there were many suspected local residents who were "depicted as poor, dangerous, and backward." A local farmer was convicted in 1993 but was released when Joseph Paul Franklin confessed to the crime. Throughout the story's telling, Copley Eisenberg provides insight into the harmful stories told and believed about people who live in Appalachia. She also discusses how "this mysterious murder has loomed over all those affected for generations, shaping their fears, fates, and desires."

== Background ==
In the summer of 2007, Copley Eisenberg lived in Pocahontas County while completing a school internship, an experience she called "really disorienting and really important." During this time, she heard about the Rainbow Murders, as well as the overarching narrative that the locals didn't like two outsiders coming to their town and thus, murdered them. As an outsider herself, the story stuck with her, but parts of it "felt contradictory" to her experience with "a little, loving, connected, interesting community."

The story and her experiences in the county lingered with her, and while she attempted to write fictional stories about the region, they never felt right. She ended up returning, living in the county from the summer of 2009 to the winter of 2011, during which time she served as an AmeriCorps member and worked "as a counselor at a girls’ wilderness and empowerment camp."

Following various events in Charlottesville, Virginia in the mid-2010s, including the Charlottesville car attack, Copley Eisenberg decided she wanted to write about the county using nonfiction and to "be part of a broader conversation that was going on about the South and Appalachia and gender and class and race and sexual violence." She remembered hearing about the Rainbow Murders and upon researching the topic, found "it was written about so poorly with so many of the stereotypes and offensive, really nasty, violent language." From here, the idea developed to discuss the larger issues within the context of these murders.

After drafting the book, Copley Eisenberg asked several people from within Appalachia and from outside of it to review the material to check whether it told the story clearly, correctly, and portrayed Appalachians the way they wish to be portrayed.

Before the book's publication, she had the book professionally fact-checked.

== Reception ==
=== Reviews ===
The Third Rainbow Girl received reviews from The New York Times Book Review, Booklist, Star Tribune, The Globe and Mail, The Seattle Times, NPR, Library Journal, Kirkus, Publishers Weekly, Pittsburgh Post-Gazette, On the Seawall, and Bookreporter

Many critics commented on the book's portrayal of modern misogyny and women's fears. NPR's Maureen Corrigan called The Third Rainbow Girl "[a] haunting ... book about restless women and the things that await them on the road." Writing for The New York Times Book Review, Melissa Del Bosque called it "an unflinching interrogation of what it means to be female in a society marred by misogyny."

Critics also discussed how the book aligned with existing genre conventions. On the topic, The Nation's Rachel Monroe said, "The Third Rainbow Girl is part of a new wave of books upending true-crime tropes and pushing at the boundaries of the genre. If this is a book about a murder, it is also a book about the history of economic exploitation in Appalachia, the systemic biases of the criminal justice system, and the unreliability of memory.” Corrigan referred to the book as "hard-to-characterize." Booklist, too, noted that "The book is more than just another true crime memoir; Eisenberg has crafted a beautiful and complicated ode to West Virginia. Exquisitely written, this is a powerful commentary on society’s notions of gender, violence, and rural America. Readers of literary nonfiction will devour this title in one sitting.”

Spectrum Culture gave a negative review, stating, "Copley Eisenberg tries to cram far too many ideas into one narrative, in turn losing the most important thread contained therein."

The New York Times also included the book in its list of notable books released in 2020.

=== Awards ===
Year	Award	Category	Result	Ref.
2021	Edgar Awards	Best Fact Crime	Nominee	
2021	Anthony Award	Novel	Nominee	
2021	Lambda Literary Awards	Bisexual Nonfiction	Finalist	
