= Vortex I =

American rock festival

Vortex I: A Biodegradable Festival of Life
- Genre: Various
- Dates: August 28 – September 3, 1970
- Location: Milo McIver State Park near Estacada, Oregon
- Years active: 1970
- Founders: The Portland Counterculture Community with help from Oregon governor Tom McCall
- Website: (none)

Vortex I: A Biodegradable Festival of Life, more commonly known as just Vortex I, was a week-long rock festival in Oregon in 1970. It was sponsored by the Portland counterculture community, with help from the state of Oregon in Clackamas County near Portland. The festival was meant to demonstrate the positive side of the anti-War Movement and to prevent violent protests during a planned appearance by President Richard Nixon at a convention of the American Legion. Nixon ended up cancelling his appearance due to scheduling conflicts, with Vice President Spiro Agnew appearing instead. It remains the only state-sponsored rock festival in United States history.

== Background ==
In 1970, President Nixon scheduled an appearance at the national American Legion convention in Portland, Oregon, in order to promote the continuation of the Vietnam War. A coalition of Portland-based anti-Vietnam War groups, called the People's Army Jamboree, planned a series of demonstrations and other anti-war activities, to be held at the same time as the convention. Law enforcement at all levels, expecting massive numbers of protesters on both sides, were concerned about large-scale violence—an FBI report estimated a potential crowd of 25,000 Legionnaires and 50,000 anti-war protestors, and suggested that the result could be worse than the protests at the 1968 Democratic National Convention in Chicago.

A loose association of Portland counterculture groups banded together to devise a strategy that would highlight the best parts of the newly-evolving peace community. Koinonia House, a peace-activist Christian group hosted a public meeting and from there the idea of a "Biodegradable Festival of Life" called Vortex 1 came into being. Mike Carr, Lee Meier, Kristen Hansen and Nik Hougen were the first to go meet with Ed Westerdahl to discuss this concept, People from the following meetings including Bobby Wehe, Kaushal Yellin, and Glen Swift who went to meet Governor Tom McCall while others began to scout parklands nearby Portland that could accommodate such an event.

In order to keep the peace, McCall acted on a suggestion by staffer Ed Westerdahl who had been meeting with the Vortex volunteers. He made an agreement with representatives of local anti-war factions to permit a rock festival to be held in a state park at the same time as Nixon's scheduled visit, and to turn a blind eye toward behavior that had been widespread at the Woodstock Festival, like nudity and use of marijuana. McCall has been heard to remark that by making this agreement—less than three months before the upcoming November vote, in which he was running for re-election—he had "committed political suicide."

== The event ==
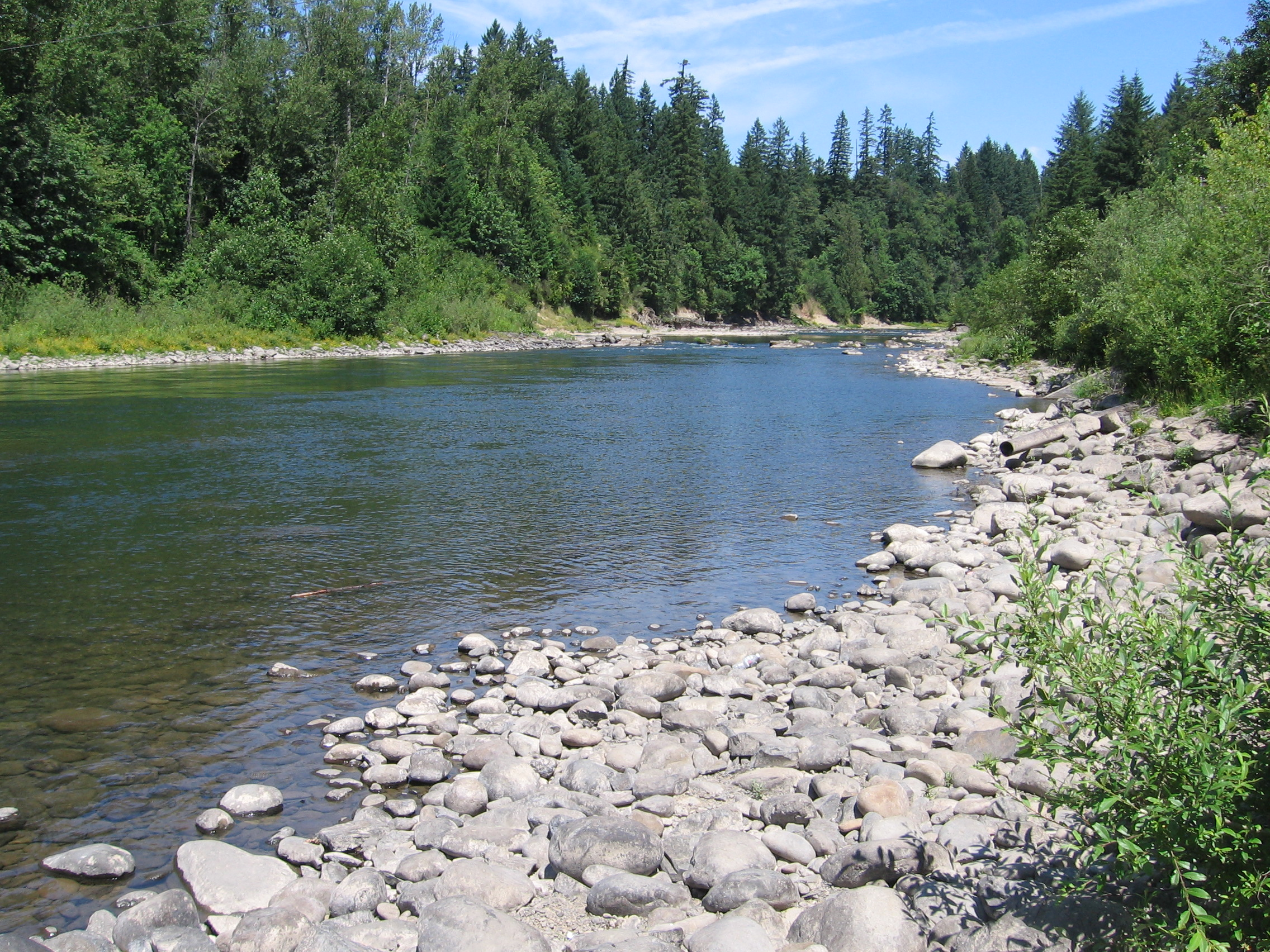
Milo McIver State Park, the location of the festival

The festival was held from August 28 through September 3, concurrent with the American Legion convention. Between 30,000 and 100,000 attended the event, held at Milo McIver State Park, near the city of Estacada. Admission was free of charge, so the gates to the event were not monitored (and accurate attendance figures were not available). On the busiest day of the festival, a line of automobiles ran 18 miles (30 km) from the park gates to southeast Portland.

Per agreement with the governor, the police and the Oregon National Guard largely ignored non-violent offenses such as drug use and public nudity, both of which were present at the festival. The festival became known as "The Governor's Pot Party".

The music at the festival was primarily performed by local acts. Oregon bands featured at the concert included Brown Sugar with Lloyd Jones, Jacob's Ladder, Portland Zu, Mixed Blood, and concert openers TuTu Band. The media reported that many prominent national acts of the time would appear, including Santana, Jefferson Airplane, and Grateful Dead, but none did. Nationally known artists that did perform, though not rock bands, included blues harmonica player and singer Charlie Musselwhite and his blues band. Soul/R&B singer Gene Chandler also performed, backed by the band Funk. Ginger Baker of Cream came to visit the event but did not play. This did little to dampen the enthusiasm of the attendees.

The Vortex 1 festival was essentially divided in two areas: the first at the higher elevations of McIver Park, held a huge home-built stage made of huge Oregon timbers; and the second, below by the Clackamas River held a sprawling encampment. The Portland community-based activist groups tended collectively to the various needs of the festival. The food co-ops and organic restaurants put together a facility that provided free food for the tens of thousands of attendees. The community free clinics (Outside In and LookingGlass) provided medical care. The motor heads parked the cars. The rock and roll halls from Portland ran the stage. Yoga groups held classes. Peace activist groups sponsored teach-ins and so on. It was truly a community-based, non-commercial event. The early pioneers of the Rainbow Gatherings worked there making an information booth, helping with security, lost children, supply trucks, stage building and that is where they took the name Rainbow Family.

== Aftermath ==
Though no doubt aided by a last-minute cancellation by Nixon, the event had its desired effect. Both the American Legion convention and the anti-war activities of the Jamboree were carried out without any major incident. The concert was considered by many to be an excellent means of preventing violence; there was no interpersonal violence or harm, and the damage to property in Portland was limited to a single broken window. Far from committing political suicide, McCall won re-election that November, defeating opponent Robert W. Straub handily.

McCall later told Studs Terkel: "It was the damnedest confrontation you'll ever see. We took a park, twenty miles (32 km) south of Portland, and turned it into an overnight bivouac and disco party.…There was a lot of pot smoking and skinny dipping, but nobody was killed."

Because the event was non-commercial, had no commercial backers and the performers were mostly local bands, the mainstream press largely ignored it as a music event, focusing instead on the political aspects. It was one of the largest rock and roll festivals of the era.

== See also ==
- List of historic rock festivals
- List of music festivals
