= Emma Copley Eisenberg =

Queer American writer

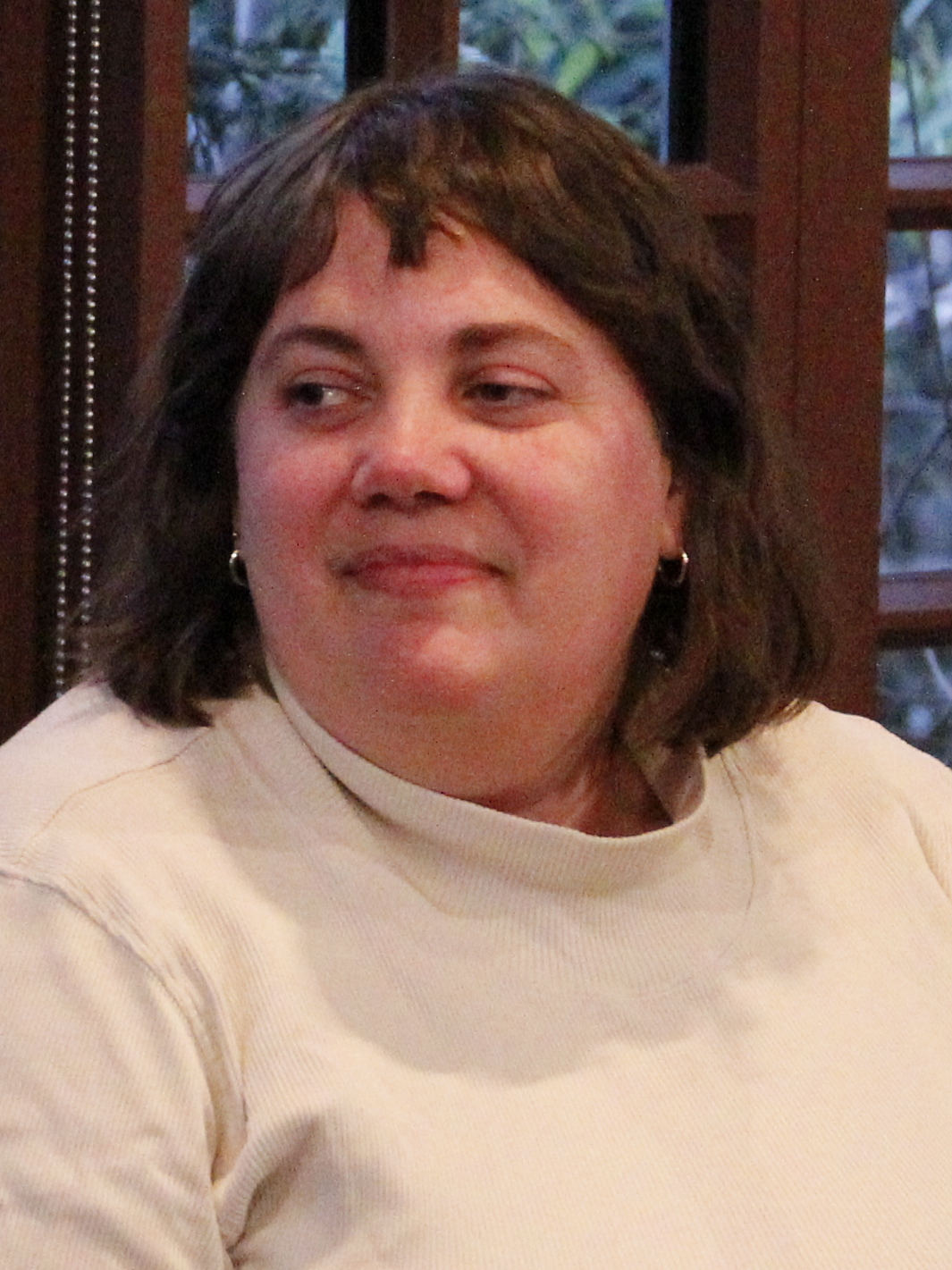
- Copley Eisenberg in 2025
- Born: 1987 (age 38–39)
- Education: Haverford College (BA); University of Virginia (MFA)
- Occupations: Author, teacher, co-founder of Blue Stoop
- Writing career
- Notable work: Housemates
- Website: www.emmacopleyeisenberg.com

Emma Copley Eisenberg (born 1987) is an American queer writer of fiction and nonfiction works. Her first book, The Third Rainbow Girl, was nominated for an Edgar Award, Lambda Literary Award, and Anthony Bouchercon Award.

== Personal life ==
Copley Eisenberg was raised in New York City and currently resides in Philadelphia. Her father, Alan Eisenberg, was the Executive Director of the Actors Equity Association, the Union for Broadway stage actors. Her mother, Claire Copley, owned an art gallery before becoming a children’s librarian, and is the daughter of artist William Copley and granddaughter of Ira Copley, who founded Copley Newspaper chain.

She received a bachelor of arts from Haverford College and an MFA in fiction writing from the University of Virginia.

In 2007, as a college student, Copley Eisenberg completed an internship in Pocahontas County, West Virginia, the location of her book The Third Rainbow Girl. The experience lingered with her, and she returned in 2009 and lived there until 2011, during which time she served as an AmeriCorps member and worked "as a counselor at a girls’ wilderness and empowerment camp."

== Career ==
Copley Eisenberg has taught fiction writing at Bryn Mawr College, Temple University, Haverford College, and Wesleyan University, the University of Virginia, and ZYZZYVA.

In 2018, along with several other writers, Copley Eisenberg co-founded Blue Stoop, an organization that "nurtures an inclusive literary community by creating pathways to access writing education, inspiration, and professional support, and celebrating Philadelphia’s rich writing tradition." She is currently on the board of the organization.

== Writing ==
Copley Eisenberg's work has appeared in The New York Times, McSweeney's, Granta, The Virginia Quarterly Review, Tin House, Esquire, Guernica, The Washington Post, The Philadelphia Citizen, and others.

=== The Third Rainbow Girl (2020) ===
Copley Eisenberg's debut book, The Third Rainbow Girl: The Long Life of a Double Murder in Appalachia, was published January 21, 2020, by Hachette Books. The book follows the true story of the murders of Vicki Durian and Nancy Santomero in Pocahontas County, West Virginia in June 1980 when the duo had been hitchhiking to the Rainbow Gathering. Though no one was prosecuted for the "Rainbow Murders" for 13 years, many suspected local residents who were "depicted as poor, dangerous, and backward." A local farmer was convicted in 1993 but was released when Joseph Paul Franklin confessed to the crime. Throughout the story's telling, Copley Eisenberg provides insight into the harmful stories told and believed about people who live in Appalachia. She also discusses how "this mysterious murder has loomed over all those affected for generations, shaping their fears, fates, and desires."

Overall, The Third Rainbow Girl was positively received by critics,[5] with rave reviews from The New York Times Book Review,[6] Booklist,[7] The Minnesota Star Tribune,[8] The Globe and Mail,[9] The Seattle Times,[10] and NPR,[11][12] as well as positive reviews from Library Journal,[13] Kirkus Reviews,[14] Publishers Weekly,[15] Pittsburgh Post-Gazette,[16] On the Seawall,[17] and Bookreporter[18]

The Third Rainbow Girl was nominated for an Edgar Award for Best Fact Crime, a Lambda Literary Award for Bisexual Nonfiction, and an Anthony Bouchercon Award. The New York Times included the book in its list of notable books released in 2020.

=== Housemates (2024) ===
Copley Eisenberg's second book, Housemates, was published by Hogarth and released May 28, 2024. In a starred review, Kirkus Reviews called the book "emotionally rich and quietly thought-provoking, this is simply a stunning fiction debut." Publishers Weekly described the story as starting slow, "but once Eisenberg revs the engine, she reaches luminous heights. Readers will count themselves lucky to go along for the ride." Electric Literature positively summed up the novel: "At heart, Housemates is a joyous novel that bubbles with the effervescence of queer youth, celebrates the idiosyncratic and sometimes absurd queer culture of West Philadelphia, and chases down young love."

The novel was a national bestseller, named a best book of 2024 by The Boston Globe, People magazine, NBC, Kirkus Reviews, Autostraddle, Them.us, and Electric Literature, and recommended on Good Morning America.

=== Fat Swim (2026) ===
Copley Eisenberg's third book, Fat Swim, is a set of interlinked stores following multiple characters "navigating bodies, queerness, power, and sex" and is to be released in April 2026 by Hogarth.
