= Fear of crime =

Fear of being a victim of crime

Fear of crime refers to the fear of being a victim of crime, which is not necessarily reflective of the actual probability of being such a victim.

== History ==
Since the late 1960s, the study of fear of crime had grown considerably.

In addition to rises in crime rates and experience, David Garland also notes the significance of high-visibility events in the 1960s US and 1980s UK as well as the drug-related crimes of the 1980s committed by people who were "often portrayed as desperate, driven and capable of mindless violence."

== Contributing factors ==
While fear of crime can be differentiated into public feelings, thoughts and behaviors about the personal risk of criminal victimization, distinctions can also be made between the tendency to see situations as fearful, the actual experience while in those situations, and broader expressions about the cultural and social significance of crime and symbols of crime in people's neighborhoods and in their daily, symbolic lives. Factors influencing the fear of crime include the psychology of risk perception, circulating representations of the risk of victimization (chiefly via interpersonal communication and the mass media), public perceptions of neighborhood stability and breakdown, the influence of neighbourhood context, and broader factors where anxieties about crime express anxieties about the pace and direction of social change. There are also some wider cultural influences. For example, some have argued that modern times have left people especially sensitive to issues of safety and insecurity.

While people may feel angry and outraged about the extent and prospect of crime, surveys often ask people "whom are [they] afraid of" and "how worried are [they]". Underlying the answers that people give are (more often than not) two dimensions of 'fear':

1. those everyday moments of worry that transpire when one feels personally threatened;
2. some more diffuse or 'ambient' anxiety about risk.

While standard measures of worry about crime regularly show between 30% and 50% of the population of England and Wales express some kind of worry about falling victim, probing reveals that few individuals actually worry for their own safety on an everyday basis. One can thus distinguish between fear (Note: Which is defined as "an emotion or feeling of alarm or dread caused by an awareness or expectation of danger") and some broader anxiety. Some people may be more willing to admit their worries and vulnerabilities than others.

People who feel specially vulnerable to victimization are more likely (than those with less fear of crime) to report feeling less able to defend themselves, low self-efficacy, believing that the consequences would be more significant, and being a likelier target of crime. Warr (1987) argued that 'sensitivity to risk' is not the same for all crimes and can vary dramatically from crime to crime depending on the perceived seriousness of a crime.

=== First- and second-hand experiences ===
Hearing about events and knowing others who have been victimised are thought to raise perceptions of the risk of victimization. This has been described as a 'crime multiplier', or processes operating in the residential environment that would 'spread' the impacts of criminal events. Skogan cautions '… many residents of a neighbourhood only know of [crime] indirectly via channels that may inflate, deflate, or garble the picture.'

=== Perceptions of a community ===
Public concern about neighbourhood disorder, social cohesion and collective efficacy correlates with fear of crime. The incidence and risk of crime has become linked with perceived problems of social stability, moral consensus, and the collective informal control processes that underpin the social order of a neighbourhood. Such 'day-to-day' issues ('young people hanging around', 'poor community spirit', 'low levels of trust and cohesion') produce information about risk and generate a sense of unease, insecurity and distrust in the environment (incivilities signal a lack of conventional courtesies and low-level social order in public places). Moreover, many people express through their fear of crime some broader concerns about neighbourhood breakdown, the loss of moral authority, and the crumbling of civility and social capital.

People can come to different conclusions about the same social and physical environment: two individuals who live next door to each other and share the same neighbourhood can view local disorder quite differently. Some research out of the UK has suggested that broader social anxieties about the pace and direction of social change may shift levels of tolerance to ambiguous stimuli in the environment. Individuals who hold more authoritarian views about law and order, and who are especially concerned about a long-term deterioration of community, may be more likely to perceive disorder in their environment (net of the actual conditions of that environment). They may also be more likely to link these physical cues to problems of social cohesion and consensus, of declining quality of social bonds and informal social control.^{:5}

=== Media ===
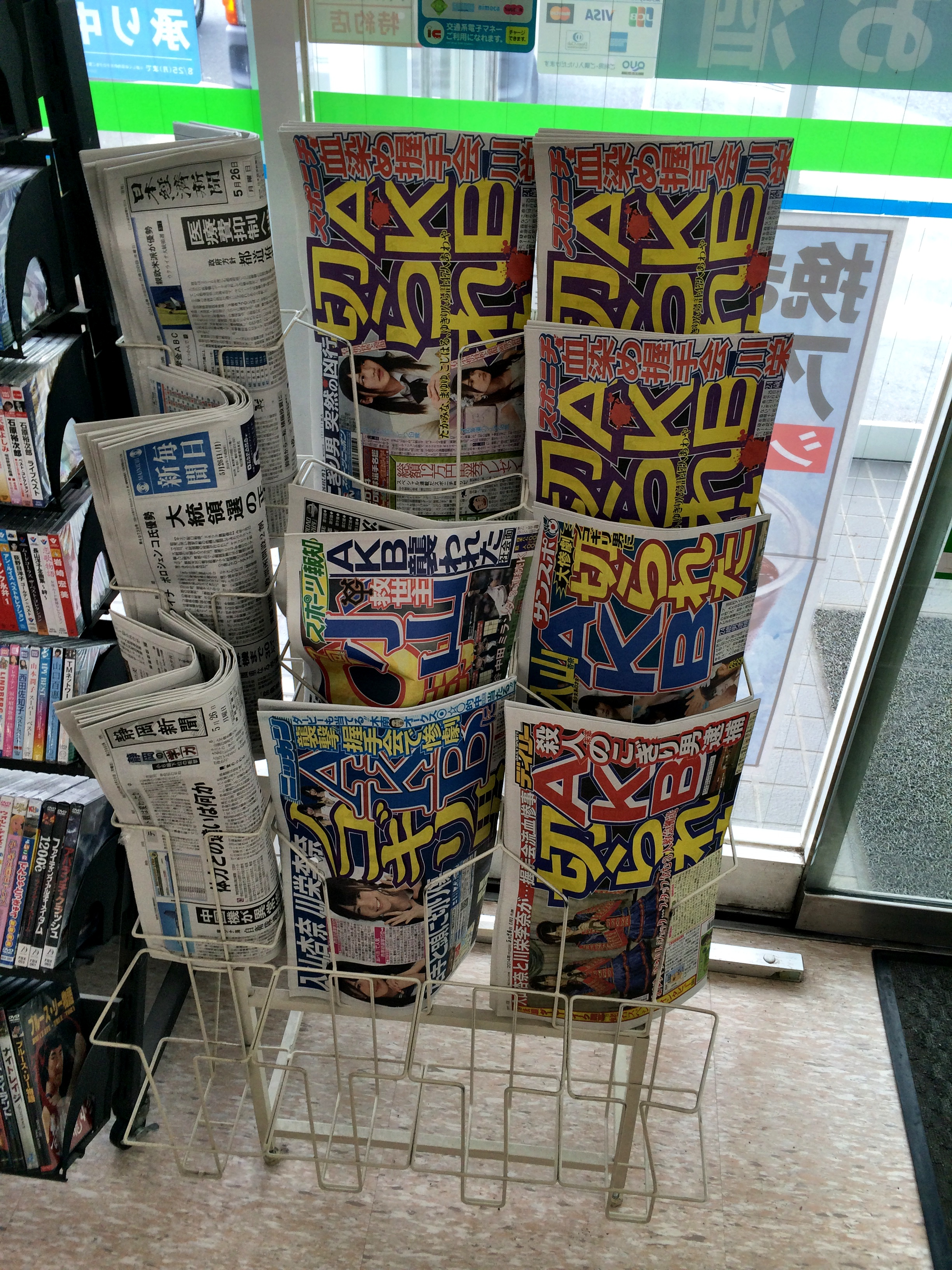
Full front pages of Japanese newspapers about a crime that left 3 injured

Public perceptions of the risk of crime are, in part, shaped by mass media coverage: individuals pick up from media and interpersonal communication circulating images of the criminal event — the perpetrators, victims, motive, and representations of consequential, uncontrollable, and sensational crimes. The notion of 'stimulus similarity' may be key: if the reader of a newspaper identifies with the described victim, or feels that their own neighbourhood bears resemblance to the one described, then the image of risk may be taken up, personalised and translated into personal safety concerns.

Yet the relationship between fear of crime and mass media lacks consensus in its causal ordering; do people fear crime because a lot of crime is being shown on television, or does television just provide footage about crimes because people fear crime and want to see what's going on? A number of studies suggest that the media selectively covers crime, distorting the perception of the everyday world of crime.^{:4} Some scholars suggest the fear of crime is a more serious threat than crime itself;^{:3} others imply the media contributes to the climate of fear that is created, for the actual frequency of victimization is a tiny fraction of potential crime.^{[2]}

Robert Reiner found crime series remained stable at around 25% of fictional TV series in Britain from 1955–1991, while news coverage increased.^{:206} Clive Emsley argued that, due to their being commercial entities seeking profit, newspapers have always discussed more serious crimes disproportionately when compared to minor crimes.

In 2022, Lee, Ellis, Keel, Wickes, and Jackson have found that media fragmentation serves a protective function in challenging law-and-order rhetoric that might amplify fear of crime.

== Relationship to crime rates ==
While fear of crime tends to rise with rising crime rates, it tends not to fall as quickly when crime rates fall. Taylor and Hale also argue that crime rates may be significantly different in neighbourhoods with similar levels of fear about crime.

David Garland believes that crime can become a 'settled cultural fact' that is sustained by cultural scripts even if crime levels drop. Because the relationship between crime and fear thereof can diverge, some governments also take measures to reduce the fear of crime in addition to measures that seek to reduce crime itself.

== Impacts ==
Fear of crime has significant psychological and social impacts that influence public policy and the built environment. Fear of crime has been shown to reduce support for the government and even the type of regime (such as democracy).

It can, by itself, erode individual wellbeing and community cohesion. A possible avenue for the fear to impact health is if someone reduces healthy routine activities and habits, such as exercise and socializing, out of fear of crime.

== See also ==
- Dog whistle (politics)
- Public criminology
- Women's fear of crime
- Crime harm index
- Crime statistics
- Dark figure of crime
- List of unsolved deaths
- Under-reporting
