= Rainbow Family =

Counter-culture in existence since approximately 1970

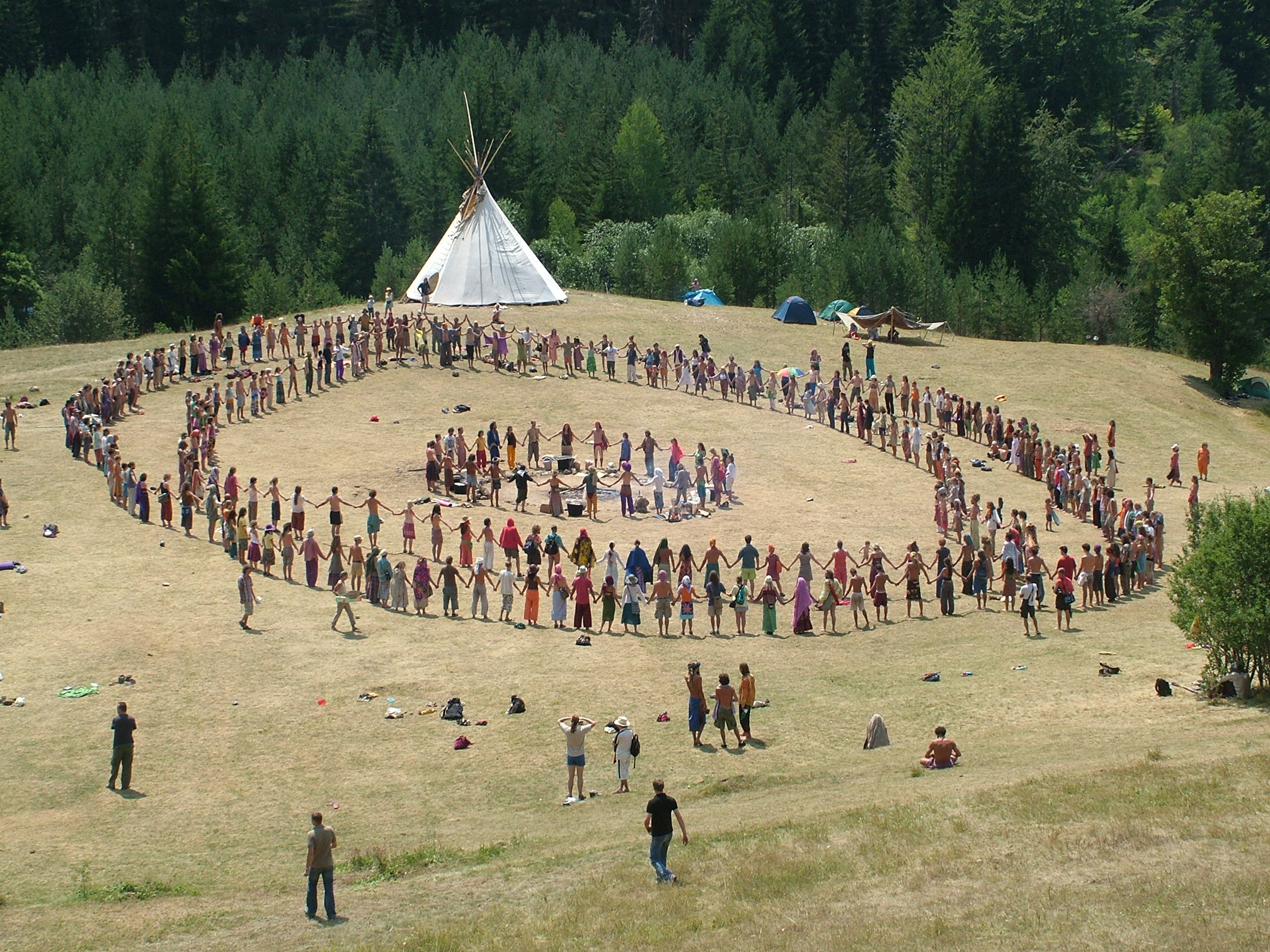
A 2007 Rainbow Gathering in Bosnia

The Rainbow Family of Living Light is a Counterculture movement, in existence since approximately 1970. It is a loose affiliation of individuals, some nomadic, generally asserting that it has no leader. They put on yearly, primitive camping events on public land known as Rainbow Gatherings.

== Origins ==
The Rainbow Family was created out of the Vortex I gathering at Milo McIver State Park in Estacada, Oregon (30 miles south of Portland, Oregon), from August 28 to September 3, 1970. Inspired in large part by the first Woodstock Festival, two attendees at Vortex, Barry "Plunker" Adams and Garrick Beck, are both considered among the founders of the Rainbow Family. Adams emerged from the Haight-Ashbury scene in San Francisco and is the author of Where Have All the Flower Children Gone? Beck is the son of Julian Beck, founder of The Living Theatre, known for their production Paradise Now!

The first official Rainbow Family Gathering was held at the Strawberry Lake, Colorado, on the Continental Divide, in 1972. A week before the festival was to begin, local authorities banned the event and state police blocked the road to the lake. A film of the 1972 Gathering states that Paul Geisendorfer, a local landowner, offered his land as a temporary site as over 10,000 attendees gathered behind police barriers. While there were hundreds of arrests, the huge number of attendees caused authorities to stand down and let them pass through the barriers.

== Practices ==
Regional Rainbow Gatherings are held throughout the year in the United States, as are annual and regional gatherings in dozens of other countries. These Gatherings are non-commercial, and all who wish to attend peacefully are welcome to participate. There are no leaders, and traditionally the Gatherings last for a week, with the primary focus being on gathering on public land on the Fourth of July in the U.S., when attendees pray, meditate, and/or observe silence in a group effort to focus on world peace. Most gatherings elsewhere in the world last a month from new moon to new moon, with the full moon being the peak celebration. Rainbow Gatherings emphasize a spiritual focus towards peace, love, and unity.

Those who attend Rainbow Gatherings usually share an interest in intentional communities, ecology, spirituality, and entheogens. Attendees refer to one another as "brother", "sister", or the gender neutral term, "sibling". Attendance is open to all interested parties, and decisions are reached through group meetings leading to some form of group consensus. Adherents call the camp "Rainbowland" and refer to the world outside of gatherings as "Babylon". The exchange of money is frowned upon, and barter is stressed as an alternative.

== Goals ==
The organization is a loose, international affiliation of individuals who have a stated goal of trying to achieve peace and love on Earth. Participants make the claim that they are the "largest non-organization of non-members in the world." In addition to referring to itself as a non-organization, the group's "non-members" refer to the group as a "disorganization."

There are no official leaders or structure, no official spokespersons, and no formalized membership. Strictly speaking, the only goals are set by each individual, as no individual can claim to represent all Rainbows in word or deed. Also contained within the philosophy are the ideals of creating an intentional community, embodying spirituality and conscious evolution, and practicing non-commercialism.

== Gatherings ==
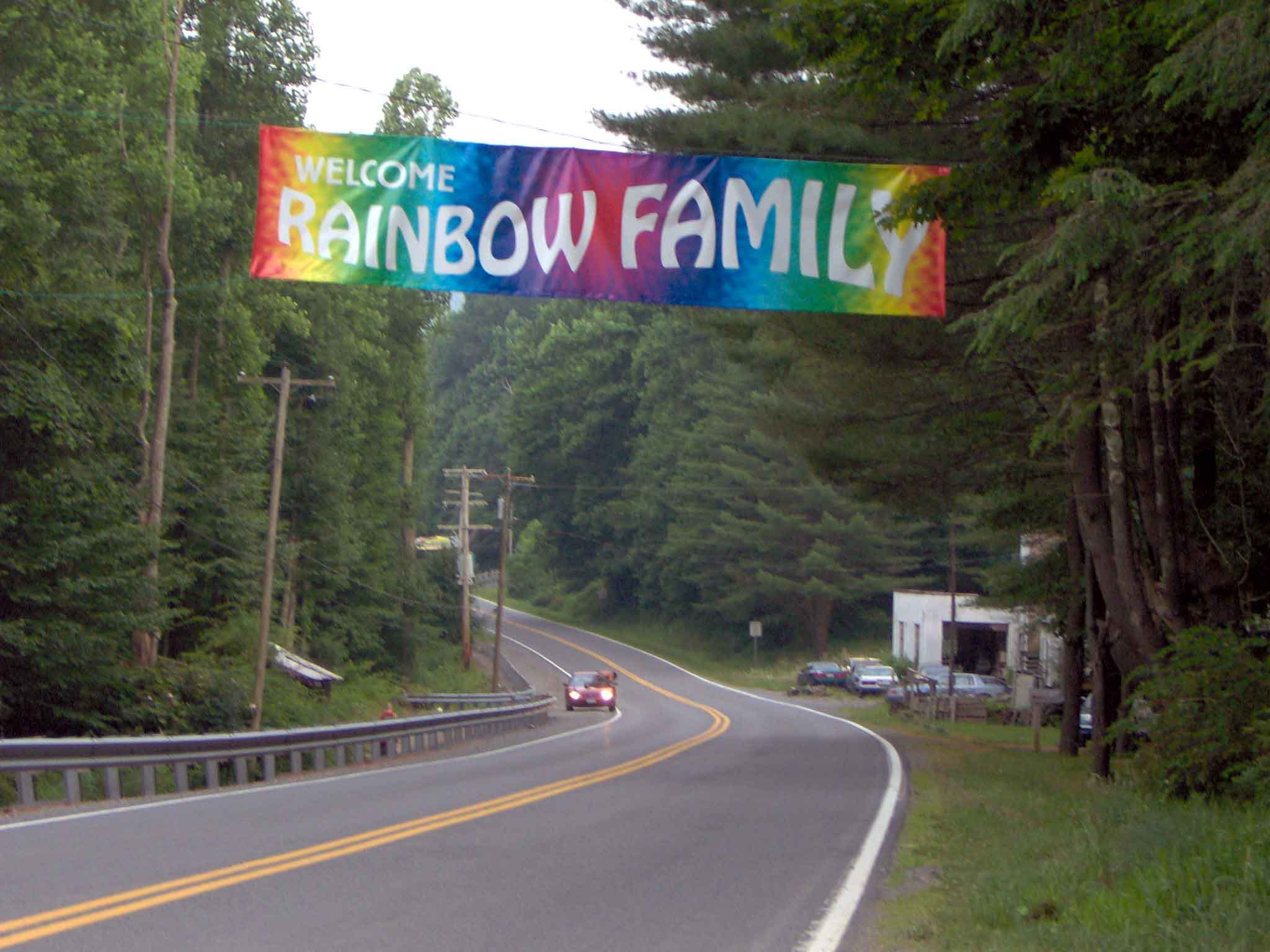
Banner hung days before the 2005 Rainbow Gathering by the inhabitants of Richwood, West Virginia, welcoming attendees

The Rainbow Family is best known for its large annual American Gatherings (i.e., U.S. "Nationals" or "Annuals") which are held on U.S. Forest Service and Bureau of Land Management (or B.L.M.) land. These U.S. Annual Gatherings have attracted up to 20,000 participants, but attendance has fallen to 10,000 participants in recent years.

In addition to these larger U.S. Annuals, individuals practice this throughout the year in dozens of other countries. "World Gatherings" are also held from time to time in various countries. Other activities include regional Gatherings (or Regionals) and retreats. There are also small, local activities such as local drum circles, potlucks, music related events, and campouts.

The first European Rainbow gathering took place in 1983. In 1992, American immigrants organized the first Rainbow gathering in Israel, which was extended to six weeks.

Money is not used (or not encouraged), camps set up kitchens to share food, and there is a circle on the Fourth of July to pray for peace.

Colorado law enforcement agencies and the U.S. Forest Service indicated they expected a month-long gathering in 2022 for the 50th anniversary of the first official Gathering.

== Controversy ==
An outbreak of shigellosis (bloody diarrhea) occurred at the 1987 gathering in Joyce Kilmer Memorial Forest in Graham County, North Carolina, in the remote southwestern NC Great Smoky Mountains. Hundreds of participants were sickened, overwhelming area hospitals and EMS agencies. Graham County had no hospital. As Graham County's small EMS and five ambulances were overwhelmed, dozens of ambulances from as far away as Jackson County and the Eastern Band Cherokee reserve were dispatched. The outbreak was attributed to poor hygiene. The county sheriff requested outside law enforcement assistance. NC Governor Jim Martin ordered deployment of 50 NC state troopers, 25 state game wardens, and additional SBI agents. Dozens of deputies and police officers from surrounding jurisdictions, and over 75 US Forest Service law enforcement officers and agents responded from as far away as Alabama. State and federal criminal charges included hundreds of traffic and alcohol citations, with impoundment of dozens of vehicles. Hundreds of criminal charges included disorderly conduct, indecent exposure, DWI, alcohol violations, revoked licenses, stolen tags, stolen vehicles, drug charges, child neglect, weapons violations, assault, interfering with peace officers and at least one kidnapping. A prison department bus was called to handle the volume of arrestees. County jails in all of the southwestern NC counties were filled on July 4 weekend. Federal, state and local officers eventually charged a remaining group that refused to leave with trespassing on federal land, to bring the event to a close.

A parvovirus outbreak among the dogs at a 2006 Rainbow Gathering in Big Red Park required 200 doses of vaccine and cost the Routt County Humane Society $800. Although Rainbow Family spokespeople have stated that the group removes its trash after gatherings, the Forest Service has criticized their cleanup efforts as being only "cosmetic" and "not rehabilitation by any stretch of the imagination."

In Montana in 2000, then-governor Marc Racicot declared a "state of emergency" because of fears of the coming environmental destruction of the Rainbows on the National Forest. A year later, Dennis Havig, the District ranger from the nearby town of Wisdom, commented that "There were 23,000 people here and you can find virtually no trash. There's an aspect of diminished vegetation, but you'd have to look hard to see the damage. The untrained eye isn't going to see it."

Summit County health officials also had a positive assessment of the site, said Bob Swensen, environmental director for the agency: "My opinion is, it looks as if no one had been there," Swensen concluded. "I'd have to give them an 'A' for their cleanup."

At the California National Gathering in 2004, in Modoc County, after public health officials reported speaking with their counterparts in Utah, opted to take preventive measures apart from law enforcement, which the Utah individuals found to be the source of many of the problems encountered at their event. The Public Health Department reported that the Forest Service officers were observed being confrontational and antagonistic toward the Rainbows at the Gathering site, which "did not facilitate a cooperative response from the Rainbows," the report states. "The explanation that was given is that this was an illegal gathering because no permit had been signed. However, even after the permit had been signed, this attitude was unchanged."

After the 2005 Rainbow Gathering in the National Forest near Richwood, West Virginia, Mayor Bob Henry Baber stated: "I never saw one bit of any activity that required any Forest Service legal intervention." He calls the Incident Management Team "bizarre and unnecessary," and adds that he was not put off by the Rainbows or their behavior.

In 1980, two young women were shot to death in late June while hitchhiking to the Rainbow Gathering at Monongahela National Forest in West Virginia, and members were questioned about possible involvement. There had been tension between local residents and the "hippies", and police concluded local men led by Greenbrier County resident Jacob Beard were responsible. Beard was convicted in 1999, but exonerated on appeal in 2000 and received a $2 million settlement for wrongful conviction. White supremacist Joseph Paul Franklin confessed to the murders but later revealed he had just read about them. The killers remain at large and filmmaker Julia Huffman is working on a documentary, The Rainbow Murders, hoping to bring more facts to light.

There were three non-fatal stabbings at a gathering in Colorado in 2014. The same year, a woman was found dead at a Rainbow Gathering in Utah. In early 2015, there was a fatal shooting at a gathering in Florida.

In 2015, a group of Native American academics and writers issued a statement against the Rainbow Family members who are "appropriating and practicing faux Native ceremonies and beliefs. These actions, although Rainbows may not realize, dehumanize us as an indigenous Nation because they imply our culture and humanity, like our land, is anyone's for the taking." The signatories specifically named this misappropriation as "cultural exploitation." On July 4 of the same year, the Winnemem Wintu issued a cease and desist letter, on behalf of itself and the Pit River and Modoc tribes, ordering the Rainbow Family off of sacred and sensitive lands in Shasta–Trinity National Forest.

== Confusion over Hopi legend ==
There has been a long-standing Rainbow rumor that the Gathering is recognized by the elders of the Hopi people as the fulfillment of an ancient Hopi prophecy (some versions substitute Hopi with the Ojibwe people). Sometimes referred to as the Legend of the Rainbow Warriors, it was debunked as fakelore by writer Michael Niman in the 1997 book People of the Rainbow: A Nomadic Utopia. While researching the legend, Niman interviewed Thomas Banyacya, a Hopi selected by elders in the 1950s to interpret and pass on Hopi prophecies. According to Niman, Banyacya was "puzzled about the supposed Hopi prophecy" and said, "It's not right...We hope they will stop it".

Although Banyacya was unfamiliar with the Rainbow Family, he was aware of the Rainbow Warrior myth and said it was invented by two non-Native, Evangelical Christians, William Willoya and Vinson Brown. Willoya and Brown had briefly met with Banyacya before publishing Warriors of the Rainbow in 1962, a Christian tract in which they fabricated the Rainbow Warrior concept, claiming it was an ancient Native American legend and a prophecy about the Second Coming of Christ. According to Niman, the rainbow in Willoya and Brown's version was a reference to the rainbow in the Book of Genesis. Niman said Rainbows who likely don't recognize the Biblical overtones continue to cite Warriors of the Rainbow and mischaracterize it as containing a message that aligns with the Rainbow ideology, often inventing entirely new versions of the myth that they still attribute to Willoya and Brown's 1962 tract. He said, "I think that Rainbows need to shed that because there's so much associated with the Rainbow Gathering that is real, that is legitimate. You don't need to say that it's an Indian prophecy. And Rainbows are picking up on this and are sensitive to it and I don't really see much fakelore compared to a few years back, which is impressive. This is an ongoing, evolving culture and it can adapt and clean itself up".

== See also ==
- Eco-communalism
