= Women's fear of crime =

Anxiety about possible victimization

Although fear of crime affects all genders, studies consistently find that women report higher levels of fear than men, despite the fact that in many places, men's actual victimization rates are higher for most offenses. Fear of crime is related to a perceived risk of victimization, but is not the same; fear of crime may be generalized instead of referring to specific offenses, and perceived risk may also be considered a demographic factor that contributes to fear of crime. Women tend to have higher levels for both perceived risk and fear of crime.

In women's everyday lives, fear of crime can have negative effects, such as reducing their environmental mobility. Studies have shown that women tend to avoid certain behaviors, such as walking alone at night, because they are fearful of crime, and would feel more comfortable with these behaviors if they felt safer. Paradoxically, women most likely to report fear of crime are also more likely to report going out.

== Causes ==
Social scientists have differing views on the causes of women's fear of crime. Some have argued that women's heightened fear of crime is due to women's higher levels physical vulnerability compared to men, although feminist work generally resists this generalization and often tries to relocate the cause to larger societal factors.

=== Social factors ===
Awareness among women of the pervasive culture's view of women as more vulnerable than men, may influence perceptions of being more likely to be victimized and in turn contribute to their fear; in this way, it would be a perceived risk and not an actual risk of victimization that is the cause of women's fear. Some research has also suggested that women and men are similarly fearful about crime, but that dominant cultural ideas about masculinity contributes to an increased reluctance in reporting behavior among men.

One study has shown that women may have higher levels of fear of crime, not because they are scared of being victimized themselves, but fear of their children being victimized. Women are more likely than men to see their relationships with others as an interdependent relationship. This interdependent relationship makes women more scared of crimes being committed against their loved ones than themselves. This distinction of relationships cause women's fear of crime to be higher than men's fear of crime, because men do not see their relationships as interdependent. This study argues that women's fear of crime is caused by traditional societal gender roles.

=== Feminist theories ===
Feminist discourse on fear of crime tends to explain women's higher levels of fear with the unequal gender structure in most societies, which places women beneath men within the power structure and thus puts them especially at risk for victimization by men. This theory refers to the oppressive social control of women, arguing that some crimes against women (such as rape) and the socialization that women receive to feel vulnerable and fear male violence are used by the patriarchy to assert male dominance and "reinforce traditional gender hierarchies." Some feminist researchers argue that the questions that are being asked in studies of women's fear of crime do not adequately represent their actual fear. These researchers argue that abuse by men in close personal relationships is not adequately measured by typical questions on surveys, because those typical questions ask questions about crime outside of the home. They argue that women's victimization by people in their close personal relationships is not being used as a factor in measuring women's fear of crime.

== Rape fear ==
Some feminist scholars argue rape is the most gendered crime by victimization, and that fear of rape is the most important and most unique element of women's fear of crime, or even is a generalized fear of rape. Proponents of this theory, often referred to as the "shadow of sexual assault hypothesis," that women's fear of many crimes, making their overall fear higher than men's.

=== Sexual harassment and gendered fears ===
One study has shown that a man's typical response to a burglary was anger, while a woman's typical response was fear that was typical of a woman that had been sexually assaulted. Some supporters of the theory also note that sexual harassment, which most women will experience in their lifetimes, especially contributes to the fear of rape; in some cases, women's rejection of unwanted sexual advances leads to threats, and even less overt forms of harassment may increase women's wariness and fear of men in public spaces. While the fear of rape is the strongest among women, men also have a fear of rape, especially when looking at college-aged men. While men do fear sexual assault, they are more likely to fear crimes such as burglary, but there is evidence that men's fear of sexual assault is correlated with their fear of other violent crimes, supporting the shadow hypothesis.

=== Socialization of women ===
The fear of rape, unlike other fears of specific crimes, is almost exclusive to women. Among women, it is also one of the strongest crime-related fears, and is the strongest crime-related fear for young women. Levels of fear of rape vary among women by age, race or ethnicity, residential area, and other factors, but are especially high for women who have been victims of rape in the past or know victims personally (the latter group may include a significant portion of women, with one study estimating that over half of women know rape victims). Women are socialized from a very young age that rape can happen anywhere, to anyone, at any time. They are taught that they should always be aware of the possibility of rape and protect themselves from it. Young women are taught strategies to keep themselves safe, and this idea is instilled in them at a young age. This teaching women about the possibility of rape at a young age may contribute to higher levels of fear of crime in women. Studies have shown that women that take more precautionary steps to avoid being raped have more fear of actually being raped, whereas women who work nights and are outside in the dark tend to have less fear of rape. This may be because women that are out in the dark alone are more familiar with the area, so they feel that there is less of a threat.

== Demographic differences ==
Although women as a whole demographic are more fearful of crime, specific subgroups of women may have higher levels of fear or be more likely to change their behavior because of it. In many studies, the demographics found to have the highest generalized fear of crime are single, older, urban, women of color, and of lower socioeconomic class. For fear of victimization for specific crimes, the demographics with the highest levels of fear may be different.

=== Geography ===
Generally, research has demonstrated that women from urban areas have higher levels of fear of crime. Even within cities, fear levels may differ from neighborhood to neighborhood. Increased social disorganization in the neighborhood (as measured by homelessness, drug sales, vandalism, prostitution, etc.) and higher rates of neighborhood serious crime lead to higher levels of fear of crime for both men and women, but both factors have a stronger effect on women's fear of crime. Recreational spaces within the urban environment can also have differentially risk, both real and perceived, with many women reporting feeling unsafe in public parks and play spaces, especially after dark.

Urban and rural communities tend to have very different levels of fear of crime. Rural areas are almost always perceived by residents and outsiders as safer, so it is often assumed that fear of crime levels will be lower there. Still, 2005 research in New Zealand and the United Kingdom noted that fear of crime levels in rural areas is on the rise, and found that sources of fear of crime among rural women often include perceived encroachment of urban influence (through people or attitudes) into their communities.

=== Race and ethnicity ===
Theorists have suggested that Black and Latina women, and women of color in general, in the United States may have higher rates of fear of crime due to increased social vulnerability; because of institutional racism and sexism against women of color, their identities may put them at greater risk of victimization, leading to higher levels of fear. Some theorists have suggested that African American women may have more fear of crime, because they are exposed to more crime due to living in lower socioeconomic areas. Studies have shown that African American women are more sexualized than White women, so their fear of sexual assault is higher. This fear of crime leads to more psychological distress among African American women. Studies have shown that there is a correlation between men holding sexist attitudes and racist attitudes, which leads to an increased possibility of accepting common rape myths.

== Proposals ==
In general, proposed solutions to women's fear of crime either place the responsibility on individual women (through preventive strategies) or on official agencies (through infrastructure improvements, anti-rape education, more involved policing, etc.), and are often framed as a combination of both. Well designed parks and play spaces, for example, that are properly managed to be well-used and that offer social activities, help women and girls to feel safe. Among proposals that expect women to protect themselves from crime, most focus on the dangers for women in public spaces; however, as women usually face their highest rates of victimization in the home or at the hands of known people, these campaigns have been suggested to be particularly ill-equipped to help solve the problem of women's high fear of crime, and to support an untrue picture of women's victimization.

=== Avoidance ===
One of the most common individual strategies for dealing with fear of crime and preventing victimization is simple avoidance, the attempt to stay away from areas (such as dark alleys or public transportation) where it is believed victimization is likely to occur; research has found that women employ avoidance strategies more often than men do. Avoided areas may include neighborhoods with high crime rates, but for many women also include any unfamiliar areas. Women may also employ other isolation strategies by avoiding social interaction with strangers, ignoring them or moving quickly and with purpose to discourage interaction.

=== Defenses ===
Another common method of allaying fear of crime among women is by "crime-proofing" homes or possessions. Popular examples include home security systems, locking away valuables, or participating in neighborhood watch programs. These strategies are used by people of all genders, but some are more often employed by women. For example, many women in an American study reported choosing purses with zippers or holding purses protectively to defend against theft and purse-snatching.

As interest in women's safety and women's fear of crime has increased, so has interest in precautionary strategies; for example, in the past few decades, women's self-defense classes, books, and other self-defense instruction have become increasingly popular. Some women also choose to carry weapons, such as knives or guns, or repellents like pepper spray and Mace to ward off potential attackers.

=== Feminist commentary ===
Feminist commentators usually take the view that the responsibility for reducing women's fear of crime lies with the society, and that fear must be combatted at its source by addressing men's violence against women.

== Worldwide ==
Although most research on women's fear of crime has been done in English-speaking countries, particularly the United States, similar trends in women's fear of crime have been found around the world.

=== Africa ===
A 2014 study using data from 20 countries in Sub-Saharan Africa concluded that fear of crime has a stronger negative effect on women's subjective well-being compared to men's, with subjective wellbeing defined as self-reported satisfaction with life. In the study, fear of crime had a statistically significant correlation with subjective wellbeing for females, but no significant correlation for males, suggesting that for the men in the study, fear of crime was not an important factor in determining their happiness and life satisfaction.

=== Asia ===
A 2013 study of Hong Kong social work students found significant gender differences in fear of crime levels. Consistent with the shadow of sexual assault hypothesis, the study found that the women had the highest levels of fear for rape, and that fear of rape was a predictor for fear of other crimes. Hong Kong has one of the lowest reported rates of crime and victimization in the world, so this study may suggest that the presence and size of gender differences in fear of crime are not strongly correlated with total crime and victimization rates.

=== Europe ===
A 1998 study in Glasgow, Scotland, found a gender disparity in fear of crime levels smaller than what is generally accepted. The study also found that men and women with similar fear levels tended to use similar reasoning to explain their fear of crime or lack of fear, although men's and women's fear appeared in different situations (men tended to be more often fearful about property crime, whereas women were more fearful about violent crime).

=== Middle East ===
A 2010 Turkish study using a large nationwide sample confirmed that women expressed significantly higher levels of fear of crime than men. The study also found that previous victimization, a consistent predictor for higher levels of fear in women, was present at close to equal rates in the male and female samples, suggesting that prior victimization has a stronger effect on women's fear of crime than on men's. Also, if the study's sample is representative of the Turkish population, women have slightly higher victimization rates than men, and so their fear does not reflect the "gender-fear paradox" of victimization found in many other developed countries.

=== India ===
A study conducted in India has shown that Indian women have more fear of being victimized by a stranger than by people with whom they have close relationships. While the women expressed fear of strangers, they changed their behaviors and attitudes to please the men close to them. These women would make sure they had dinner cooked at a certain time, and would not go out, because they did not want to make their husbands or fathers-in-law angry. Although they changed themselves to avoid disagreements with the men in their lives, they were unable to acknowledge the change of their behaviors as fear. These women were unable to label their behavior changes to please the men in their lives as fear. These women felt like they were more likely to be victimized on the street by a stranger than by people in their close personal relationships. This study also found that women that were victimized previously were more likely to admit to fear in close personal relationships.

Research across multiple countries shows consistent gender different in reported fear of crime. While explanations vary- from socialization and cultural norms to perceived vulnerability and structural inequalities- the phenomenon appears globally widespread. Women's fear reflects actual risk patterns, social expectations, or broader gendered power structures.

== See also ==
- True crime
