= Rainbow Gathering =

International hippie camping event

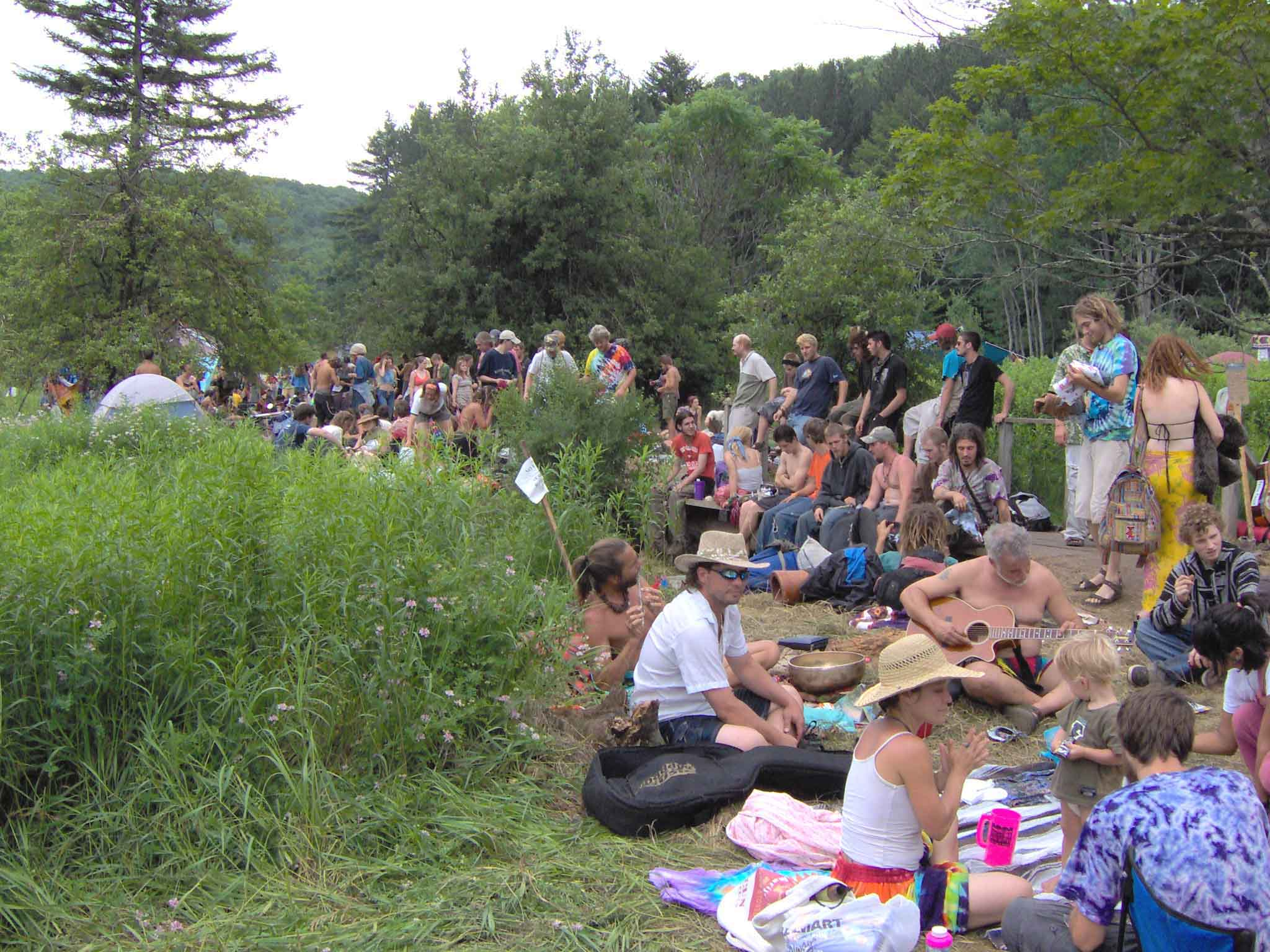
- Trading circle at Rainbow Gathering
- Status: Active
- Genre: Gathering
- Frequency: Annually, July 1–7
- Inaugurated: July 1, 1972
- Next event: For 2024, in a US National Forest or National Grassland in California, Oklahoma, or Washington
- People: Rainbow Family

Rainbow Gatherings are temporary, loosely knit communities of people, who congregate in outdoor locales around the world for one or more weeks at a time with the stated intention of living a shared ideology of peace, harmony, freedom, and respect. In the original invitation, spread throughout the United States in 1971, the "Rainbow Family Tribe" referred to themselves as "brothers & sisters, children of God", "Families of life on Earth", "Friends of Nature & of all People" and "Children of Humankind". All races, nations, politicians, etc. were invited with the aspiration that there could be peace among all people. The goal was to create what they believed was a more satisfying culture — free from consumerism, capitalism, and mass media — one that would be non-hierarchical, that would further world peace, and serve as a model for reforms to mainstream society. However, the values actually exhibited by the group have at times varied quite a bit from this ideal, with recent decades showing increasing levels of crime at the events, and some organizers stating that the core principles have been modified, and have become more mainstream, in an effort to attract more attendees.

Influenced by 1960s counterculture and the non-commercial rock festivals of the early 1970s, Rainbow is a "revitalization movement" with many philosophies and practices that have roots in the historic utopian traditions of the mid-19th century. The first Rainbow Gathering was held in Colorado in 1972 and was attended by more than 20,000. In the 1980s, gatherings started to form outside of North America as autonomous but connected events around the world.

Media coverage of Rainbow Gatherings since the 1980s has described Rainbow Gathering attendees as "aging hippies", "grown-up flower children", or "middle-aged white folks". In the 2000s, the media focus shifted to the increase in crime in the local communities closest to Gatherings, ranging from petty crimes like retail theft to violent assaults and serious traffic charges, such as driving under the influence of drugs or alcohol. Participants have developed a reputation for excessive drug and alcohol use, in addition to engaging in disruptive and criminal activity. Cultural appropriation and misrepresentation of Native American traditions and beliefs have also given the Gathering a poor reception from some nearby reservations. In the U.S., these issues may be contributing factors in the decline in attendance at regional and national Gatherings.

== Background ==
Rainbow Gatherings and the Rainbow Family of Living Light (usually abbreviated to "Rainbow Family") claim to express utopian ideals, bohemianism, hipster, and hippie culture. The gatherings have roots clearly traceable to the counterculture of the 1960s.

Rainbow Gatherings have their own jargon, which helps to create a sense of community and the ability to express attendees' thoughts on society and social justice. In particular, mainstream society is commonly referred to and viewed as "Babylon" -- a term also used by Rastafari culture -- from the Christian New Testament connoting the participants' widely held belief that modern lifestyles and systems of government are unhealthy, unsustainable, exploitative, and out of sync with the natural systems of the planet.

== History ==
The original Rainbow Gathering was in 1972, and since then gatherings have been held annually in the United States from July 1 through 7 every year on National Forest land. Throughout the year, regional and international gatherings are held in the United States and in many other places around the world.

The first Rainbow Gathering of the Tribes was a four-day event in Colorado in July 1972. It was organized by youth counterculture "tribes" (youth communes) of the Rainbow Family, based in Northern California and the Pacific Northwest. The first three days of the festival took place at Strawberry Lake, outside of Granby, Colorado. The lake is in a wooded area elevated 900 feet (270 m) above the surrounding area. Campsites surrounded the lake, and there was no event stage of any kind. On the final day, July 4, 1972, most in attendance migrated to Table Mountain, a barren summit located a mile away from the lake. This was ostensibly for the noon sighting of a white buffalo, as had been envisioned/prophesied by Barry "Plunker" Adams, a spiritual leader of the Family. A week before the festival was to begin, local authorities banned the event and state police blocked the road to the lake. A film of the 1972 Gathering states that Paul Geisendorfer, a local landowner, offered his land as a temporary site as over 10,000 attendees gathered behind police barriers. While there were hundreds of arrests, the huge number of attendees caused authorities to stand down and let them pass through the barriers. Estimates of attendance vary between 20,000 and 45,000.

The first gathering was intended to be a one-time event; however, a second gathering in Wyoming the following year materialized, at which point an annual event was declared. The length of the gatherings has since expanded beyond the original four-day span, as have the number and frequency of the gatherings.

In 2017, the United States gathering was held near the 1.4 million acres (5,700 km^{2}) Malheur National Forest in eastern Oregon. Between 10,000 and 18,000 attended the multi-day event, near Flagtail Meadow, with the largest crowds expected on July 4. The 50th Annual Rainbow Gathering took place in Taos County, New Mexico, in July 2021.

The 50th anniversary gathering in July 2022 was held in Routt National Forest, Colorado, with over 10,000 in attendance.

== Social aspects ==
=== Non-commercialism ===
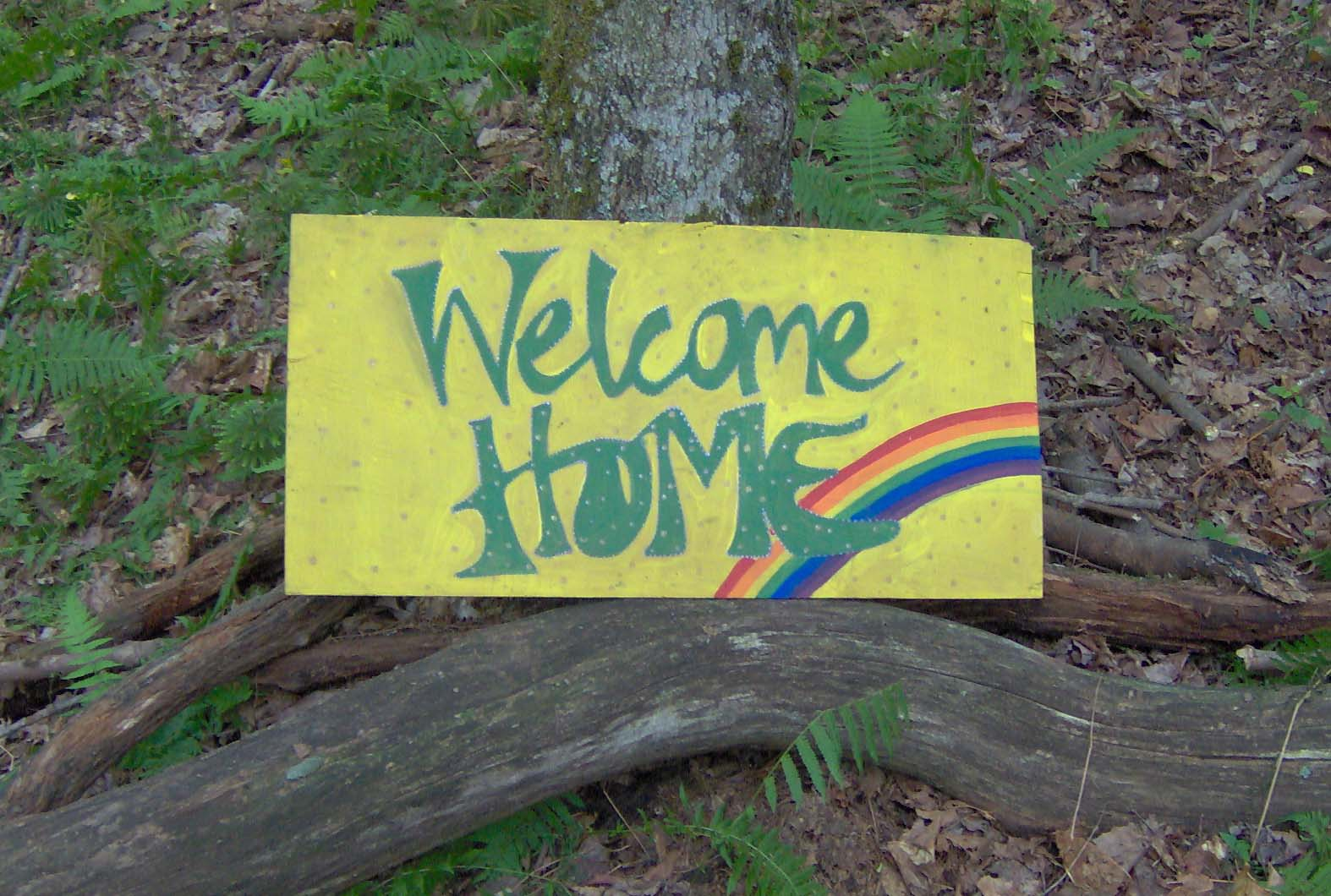
"Welcome home" and "We love you" are common greetings at the Rainbow Gathering.

As Michael Niman notes, "Rainbow Gatherings, as a matter of principle, are free and non-commercial." Using money to buy or sell anything at Rainbow Gatherings is taboo. There are no paid organizers, although there are volunteers ("focalizers") who are crucial to setting up the gathering site. Participants are expected to contribute money, labor, and/or material. All labor is voluntary and never formally compensated; conversely, there is no monetary cost or prior obligation required to attend a Rainbow Gathering.

Aside from taking up collections (the "Magic Hat" in Rainbow parlance) for essential items purchased from the local community, there is little or no exchange of currency internally at a Gathering. The primary principle is that necessities should be freely shared, while luxuries can be traded. A designated trading area is a feature at most U.S. Gatherings. It is called "trading circle" if it is circular, and "barter lane" if it is linear. Frequently traded items include items such as sweets (often referred to as "zuzus"), books, zines, crystals, rocks, gems, and handcrafts. In some rare cases people may even trade marijuana or smoking pipes (usually when no police are in the area). Snickers bars have emerged as a semi-standardized unit of exchange at some gatherings.

=== Non-membership ===
There are no official leaders, no formal structure, no official spokespersons, and no membership. Some rainbow family participants make the claim that the family is the "largest non-organization of non-members in the world". In addition to referring to itself as a non-organization, the Rainbow Family of Living Light's "non-members" also playfully call the movement a "disorganization". However, there is a changing network of "focalizers" who take responsibility for passing on Rainbow information year-round, and serve as contacts listed in the Rainbow Guide.

=== Consensus process ===
Gatherings are loosely maintained by open, free-form counsel circles consisting of any "non-members" who wish to be part of a conversation, which use consensus process for making decisions. According to the Mini-manual, "Recognized Rainbow guidelines come from only one source, a main Counsel circle at the annual gatherings."

Talking circles are also a feature of rainbow gatherings. Each participant in the circle talks in turn while all others present listen in silence. A ritual talking stick, feather, or other object is passed around the circle to allow everyone the opportunity to speak without being interrupted; this is a custom appropriated from Indigenous peoples of North America.

=== Creativity and spirituality ===
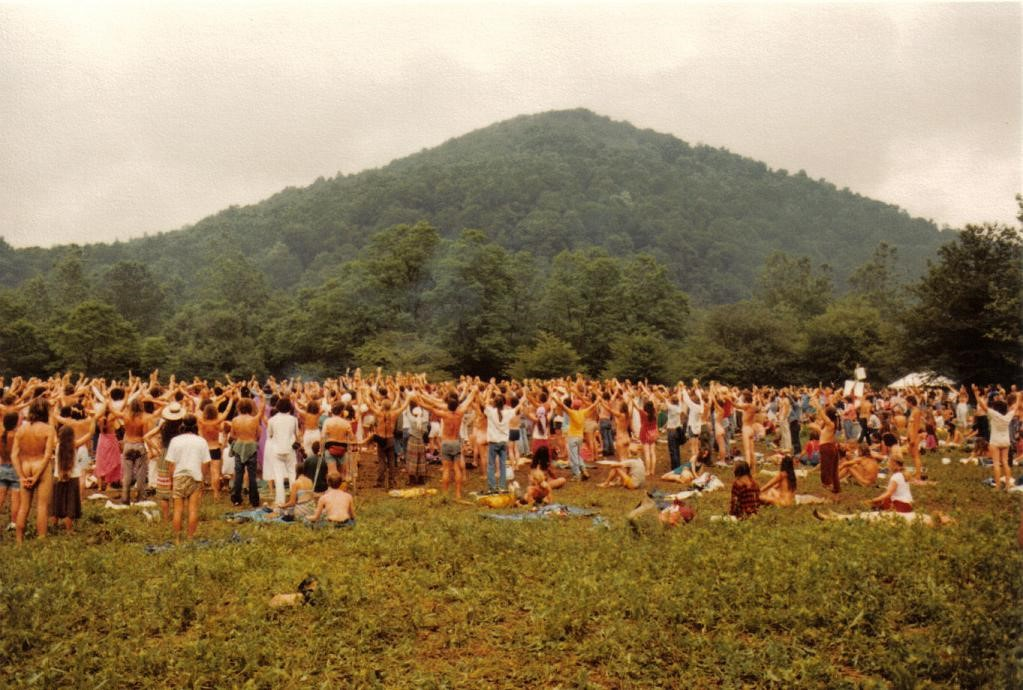
"Ohm" Circle on July 4th 1980 at West Virginia Rainbow Gathering

One of the central features of the annual U.S. gathering is silent meditation on the morning of the Fourth of July, with attendees gathering in a circle in the Main Meadow. At approximately noon the assembly begins a collective "Om" which is ended with whooping and a celebration. A parade of children comes from the Kiddie Village, singing and dancing into the middle of the circle.

Spiritually, there is a strong tradition of cultural appropriation. Native American leaders of several tribes have spoken out against the Rainbows' misappropriation of their religious ceremonies as well as their trespassing onto Native sacred sites.

Many spiritual traditions are represented, often with their own kitchens, from Hare Krishnas to Orthodox Jews to several denominations of Christianity and many others.

Creative events may include variety shows, campfire singing, fire-juggling, and large or small art projects. At one gathering, a cable car was rigged to carry groups of four quickly across a meadow. Faerie Camp was "alive with hundreds of bells and oddly illuminated objects". Musicians and music pervade all Gatherings, at kitchens, on the trails, and at campfires.

== Gathering logistics ==
"Rap 107," concise Gathering participation principles

The Rainbow Family has governed Gatherings of up to 30,000 people. Regional Rainbow gatherings can attract as many as 5,000. The U.S. annual rainbow gathering occurs around July 1-7th, but people come up to a month earlier to help set up (this is known as "Seed Camp") and remain on-site up to a month later to clean up and to engage in site restorations.

Although each event is more or less anarchic, practical guidelines have been reached through the consensus process and are documented in a "Mini-manual". Items that are strongly discouraged at gatherings, by some, include firearms, alcohol, tobacco, and pets. Other items that tend to be discouraged include radios, tape and CD players, amplifiers, and power tools.

=== Camps and kitchens ===
Camps and kitchens are the basic community units of the Gathering. Camps may be based on regional, spiritual, or even dietary commonalities. For example, Kid Village attracts attendees with children, Tea Time specializes in serving herbal teas, Jesus Camp has a Christian foundation. Some kitchens such as the Turtle Soup Kitchen serve predominantly vegetarian meals. Lovin' Ovens is a kitchen that uses craft ovens made out of metal drums, clay, and mud, and cook food such as pizza (meat, vegetarian, and vegan) and different types of bread and snacks. Nic@Nite is a camp that focuses on the sharing of tobacco and tobacco-related products.

Not all camps are kitchens, but all kitchens are camps. In addition to feeding passers-by, kitchens send food to the one or two large communal, predominantly vegetarian meals served daily in the main meadow.

=== Water and sanitation ===
Drinking water is filtered at gatherings, both by small pump filters and large gravity-feed devices. Attendees are also encouraged to boil drinking water. Water is often tapped at a source (such as a spring or stream) and runs hundreds of yards to main kitchens in the gathering via plastic hosing.

Sanitation has historically been a major concern at Rainbow Gatherings. Human waste is deposited in latrine trenches (typically referred to as 'shitters') and treated with lime and ash from campfires. New latrines are dug and filled in daily. However sanitation may still be inadequate: the 1987 gathering in North Carolina experienced a large outbreak of highly contagious shigellosis (a.k.a. dysentery), and a smaller outbreak occurred in association with a 2018 gathering in Poland.

=== C.A.L.M. ===
C.A.L.M., or the Center for Alternative Living Medicine, is the primary group of physicians at Rainbow Gatherings who assist attendees with health and wellness and take responsibility for medical emergencies and sanitation of those who attend these large gatherings.

It is an all-volunteer, non-hierarchical group encompassing both mainstream, conventional medicine and alternative medicine, such as naturopathic healing modalities. It is common to find physicians working with herbalists, EMTs helping massage therapists, and naturopaths coordinating with Registered Nurses on patient care. C.A.L.M. works closely with the Shanti peace army, as they are often the first on the scene in a crisis. There is usually one main C.A.L.M. camp near the inner part of the gatherings, and smaller first aid stations set up around the Gatherings. Even those without medical experience are encouraged to help with things such as procuring water and cooking for the healers, who are often too busy to attend main circle or visit other kitchens. In case of any emergency, CALM can be contacted on FRS Channel 3 (no tones, 462.6125 MHz UHF) and other site-specific radio frequencies.

=== Shanti Sena ===
Within the Rainbow Gathering, security, conflict resolution, and emergency situations are handled by Shanti Sena ("peace army" in Sanskrit), which includes anyone who is capable of helping at that time. Shanti Sena also sometimes acts as liaisons to observers and law enforcement personnel who patrol the Rainbow Gathering, often tracking the movements of police and park rangers through the gathering, and overseeing the interactions between officers and attendees to ensure that neither group instigates or takes part in illegal or inflammatory confrontations. This type of interference with police operations resulted in numerous arrests in the 1987 gathering in North Carolina, with state, federal, and local officers being assaulted, blocked from patrol areas, and threatened. The Shanti Sena at the '87 gathering were characterized by local, state, and federal officers as a criminal gang and were suspected of having collaborated in the assault on an Asheville Citizen-Times reporter. Several gathering attendees who reported they had been expelled from the gathering called the Shanti Sena "gestapo" and thugs. In some particularly serious situations, Shanti Sena have collaborated with law enforcement (although without violating the Gathering's principle of consensus). For example, Gathering regular and wanted murder suspect, Joseph Geibel, was peacefully approached by Shanti Sena and transferred to police custody at the 1998 gathering.

The phrase is also used as a call for aid. If individuals find themselves in a dispute, they can shout "Shanti Sena". Everyone within earshot is expected to then approach the scene calmly, de-escalate where possible, and eventually reach a consensus agreement to settle the dispute.

== Difficulties and criticisms ==
Difficulties include:

- The often unacknowledged class and power structures of the Rainbow community and its events
- The phenomenon of "Drainbows"—individuals who are perceived to not give sufficiently of their labor or other resources for the common good, but rather are only consuming the social benefits a Rainbow gathering offers (a classic cooperation problem)
- Relationships with both the Forest Service as well as local communities and other stakeholders in National Forest lands (both commercial interests as well as local environmentalists, who are often concerned about Gathering impacts)
- The Spring Council of the Rainbow Family does not inform the U.S. Forest Service of the gathering location until a few days prior to the event
- Damage to forest lands, campgrounds and facilities, with human waste, trash and other mess such as abandoned vehicles
- Occasionally the site selection process does not run smoothly resulting in a split gathering (1993); or in very low attendance either due to a dispute over the legitimacy of the site (2015) or in light of the COVID-19 pandemic

In recent years, there have been increasing reports of drifters and vagrants who attach themselves to gatherings where they engage in hard drug use, sexual assault, theft and violence. In 2014, Heber City, Utah police arrested Leilani Novak-Garcia, known as "Hitler", who repeatedly stabbed a man at the annual gathering after he tried to stop her honking her car horn. Novak-Garcia pleaded no contest to the charges and served 300 days in jail.

Jose Antonio Ramos, who was identified in 1985 and again in 2004 as the primary suspect in the disappearance of Etan Patz, attended and was removed from the Rainbow Gathering twice in the 1980s and was convicted of molesting an 8-year-old boy at a gathering in Pennsylvania. Rainbow elder Barry Adams helped to identify and convict Ramos. Ramos served a 20-year prison sentence in the State Correctional Institution in Dallas, Pennsylvania, for child molestation. He was released from prison on November 7, 2012. Soon after his release he was arrested on a Megan's Law violation.

=== Cost to local and federal governments ===
Local jurisdictions bear costs. For example, the 2013 gathering in Beaverhead County, Montana experienced uncollectible patient charges for emergency room care and additional costs incurred at the county's hospital, which totaled an estimated $175,000.

Also associated with the 2013 event was a cost to the federal government of $573,000 according to Tim Walther, assistant special agent in charge of law enforcement for the Forest Service. A total of 850 incident reports, written warnings and citations were recorded during the event. Of these, 405 incident reports were written up for Rainbow people not following the operational plan agreed upon by the Rainbows and the Forest Service.

=== Relations with law enforcement ===
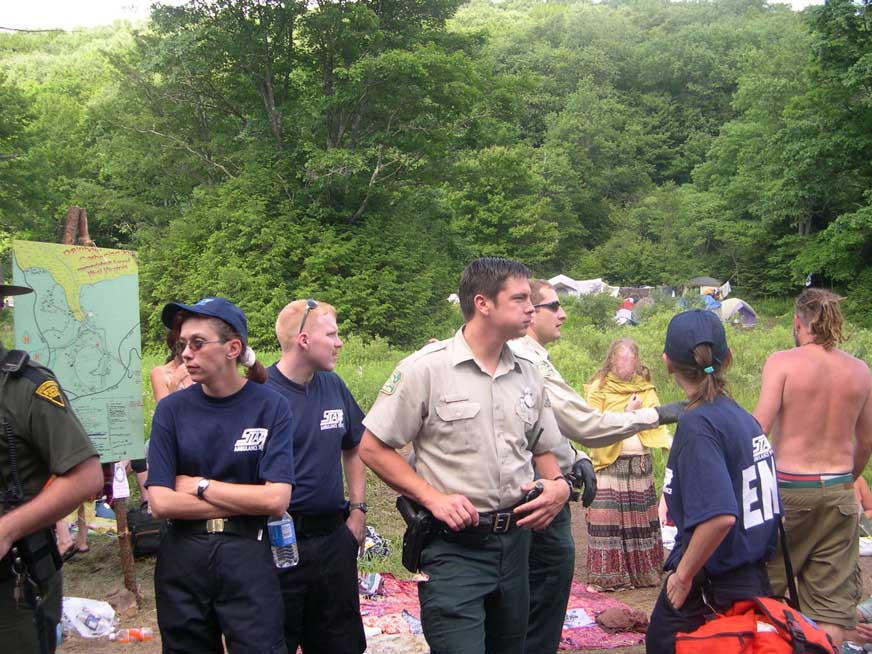
Police and medics near "trading circle" at the annual U.S. national Rainbow Gathering in West Virginia, 2005

In an October 2008 report the American Civil Liberties Union stated:

The U.S. Forest Service systematically harasses people who attend Rainbow Family gatherings on public lands.

In 2016, the American Civil Liberties Union in Vermont issued a report expressing concern over federal law enforcement activities that the ACLU describe as "overzealous" and "unconstitutional". The ACLU-VT sent letters to law enforcement officials calling for an end to the illegal targeting of Rainbow Gathering attendees expressing First Amendment rights on public land. In an October 2008 report the American Civil Liberties Union stated, "The U.S. Forest Service systematically harasses people who attend Rainbow Family gatherings on public lands."

All major gatherings in the United States are held on National Forest land, which is under the jurisdiction of the United States Forest Service, a federal agency with its own federal law enforcement officers. County sheriffs have concurrent jurisdiction on all forest lands, as do county police and local police depending on location, community boundaries and local laws. So too do state law enforcement agencies, namely state wildlife wardens, state troopers and state police or bureaus of investigation. Many local gatherings occur in remote areas, with county sheriffs being the primary responders. They often request deputies from neighboring counties and officers from area police departments. Additionally, it is common for state conservation and wildlife officers and state troopers to deploy personnel. The Forest Service has often received assistance from the FBI, US Marshalls for fugitives, DEA for drug trafficking and other federal agencies. The USFS has tried to prevent these gatherings from taking place; it denies all others access to the forest and the surrounding area for the duration of the gathering or insists that a group-use permit be signed, contending that this is standard practice for large groups wishing to camp on public land and that it is necessary to protect public safety and the local environment. Gathering organizers generally contend that the United States Constitution and Bill of Rights give them the right to peaceably assemble on public land and that requiring a permit would violate that basic right by turning it into a privilege to be regulated.

In 1984, the Forest Service enacted a regulation requiring a permit for any expressive assembly of ten or more people on Forest Service lands. This was unenforced for a year and a half before the Service attempted to apply it to the gathering in Arizona in 1986. Judge Bilby called attention to the selective enforcement of the regulation, and in any case ruled it unconstitutional, in part because it required expressive assemblies, but not non-expressive ones, to obtain permits.

The U.S. government has in the past pressured individuals to be representatives of the Gathering (e.g., by signing a permit). However, this is in violation of the well-established Rainbow principle that "no individual may officially represent the Family as a whole." A number of court cases have resulted from both Forest Service prosecutions and Rainbow Family-inspired legal actions against enforcement activities; among other legal defeats, the Forest Service found itself rebuffed by the judge in a defendant class suit originating from the 1987 North Carolina Gathering. In a notable account of Gathering relations with law enforcement, Judge Dave and the Rainbow People, was written by U.S. Federal Judge David Sentelle. The book provides a firsthand account of Sentelle's role in presiding over the 1987 case brought by the State of North Carolina in an attempt to stop the Gathering, including site visits to the Gathering and related legal actions. Garrick Beck, a Rainbow Family organizer involved in the 1987 case, wrote an afterword to the book in which he expresses agreement with Sentelle's characterizations. In that particular gathering, numerous state arrests were made for breaches of the peace, alcohol and traffic violations and interfering with officers. The federal court allowed the NC gathering to continue, but when attendees overstayed their time allocation, they were forcibly removed and arrested by state and federal officers. Damage to the Slick Rock area of Nantaha National Forest was estimated to be in the tens of thousands of dollars. An outbreak of bloody diarrhea occurred and at least two kidnapped minors were rescued from the camp in two separate incidents.

The Forest Service has dealt with the scale of the US Annual Rainbow Gathering in the past by assigning a Type 2 National Incident Management Team (NIMT). Around 40 personnel from the NIMT have been assigned in the past, including NIMT members, Forest Service law enforcement officers (LEOs) and resource advisors. Because the Rainbow Gathering has utilized the land in the past without required consent from the Forest Service, the gatherings have been given special attention, since, under current Forestry rules and regulations, they may occur illegally.

In 1999 and again in 2000, the NIMT selected three gathering participants who were charged with "use or occupancy of National Forest System lands without authorization." The citation carried a maximum penalty of six months in jail and a $5,000 fine; the charges originally could have been cleared by paying a $100 fine. Instead, they all chose to fight it in court, but lost their appeals. The three 1999 cases were later turned down by the Supreme Court.

At the 2008 National Gathering in Wyoming, an incident occurred whereby Forest Service officers tried to arrest an attendee at the gathering. A spokeswoman for the U.S. Forest Service said that about 400 participants in the Gathering began to advance, throwing sticks and rocks at the officers, although this was disputed by Gathering participants and video evidence. Pepper balls were then fired to control the crowd. Witnesses reported that officers pointed weapons at children and fired rubber bullets at gathering participants. The ACLU produced a report following their investigation of the incident in which they were critical of the officers for engaging in a pattern of harassment, using overzealous enforcement techniques, and using small violations as a pretense for larger searches.

=== Alcohol ===
According to the guidelines, or Raps of the Rainbow Gathering, open and public consumption of alcohol is discouraged by many people at the gatherings with respect for others being the primary reason. A distinguishing characteristic of the U.S. annual gatherings is "A-Camp," (commonly, and mistakenly, thought to mean "alcohol camp") typically located near the front gate, where some of those who want to openly drink alcohol usually stay, yet public drinking is generally accepted in most camps close to the road. Gatherings in Europe do not have "A-Camps." Some gatherings in Canada have "A-Camps" and some do not. Wine is tolerated in moderation at some European gatherings, particularly in France, where it is customary to drink wine with the evening meal.

=== Confusion over Hopi legend ===
There has been a long-standing Rainbow rumor that the Gathering is recognized by the elders of the Hopi people as the fulfillment of an ancient Hopi prophecy (some versions substitute Hopi with the Ojibwe people). Sometimes referred to as the Legend of the Rainbow Warriors, it was debunked as fakelore by writer Michael Niman in the 1997 book People of the Rainbow: A Nomadic Utopia. While researching the legend, Niman interviewed Thomas Banyaca, a Hopi selected by elders in the 1950s to interpret and pass on Hopi prophecies. According to Niman, Banyaca was "puzzled about the supposed Hopi prophecy" and said, "It's not right...We hope they will stop it".

Although Banyaca was unfamiliar with the Rainbow Family, he was aware of the Rainbow Warrior myth and said it was invented by two non-Native, Evangelical Christians, William Willoya and Vinson Brown. Willoya and Brown had briefly met with Banyaca before publishing Warriors of the Rainbow in 1962, a Christian tract in which they fabricated the Rainbow Warrior concept, claiming it was an ancient Native American legend and a prophecy about the Second Coming of Christ. According to Niman, the rainbow in Willoya and Brown's version was a reference to the rainbow in the Book of Genesis. Niman said Rainbows who likely don't recognize the Biblical overtones continue to cite Warriors of the Rainbow and mischaracterize it as containing a message that aligns with the Rainbow ideology, often inventing entirely new versions of the myth that they still attribute to Willoya and Brown's 1962 tract. He said, "I think that Rainbows need to shed that because there's so much associated with the Rainbow Gathering that is real, that is legitimate. You don't need to say that it's an Indian prophecy. And Rainbows are picking up on this and are sensitive to it and I don't really see much fakelore compared to a few years back, which is impressive. This is an ongoing, evolving culture and it can adapt and clean itself up".

=== Cultural appropriation ===
In 2015, a group of Native American academics and writers issued a statement against the Rainbow Gathering attendees who are "appropriating and practicing faux Native ceremonies and beliefs. These actions, although Rainbows may not realize, dehumanize us as an indigenous Nation because they imply our culture and humanity, like our land, is anyone's for the taking." The signatories specifically named this misappropriation as "cultural exploitation".

=== Deaths ===
In 1980, the bodies of two women were found after the gathering at Monongahela National Forest in West Virginia and attendees were questioned about possible involvement. They had been shot dead during the gathering. There had been tension between local residents and "hippies", and police concluded that local men led by Greenbrier County resident Jacob Beard were responsible. Beard was convicted in 1999, but exonerated on appeal in 2000 and received a $2 million settlement for wrongful conviction. White supremacist Joseph Paul Franklin confessed to the murders but later revealed he had just read about them. The killers remain at large and filmmaker Julia Huffman is working on a documentary, The Rainbow Murders, hoping to bring more facts to light. Emma Copley Eisenberg wrote about the murders and their impact in the 2020 book The Third Rainbow Girl.

In July 2011, a woman named Marie Hanson, from South Lake Tahoe, California went missing in Skookum Meadow, Washington state while attending the 2011 Rainbow Gathering at Gifford Pinchot National Forest. The local Sheriff's office reportedly initially refused to use tracking dogs at the site, stating they were not certain a crime had taken place. After pleas by the Hanson family and the Rainbow Family, a series of four searches by Rainbow Gathering attendees, law enforcement and the Hanson Family took place during late summer and fall of 2011. In October 2011, human remains and jewelry were found near the woman's campsite. It was later confirmed that the remains were those of Marie Hanson.

In 2011, four fatalities from natural causes occurred at Rainbow Gatherings, including two deaths at the 2011 Washington State national Rainbow Gathering. The Washington State deaths were those of Amber Kellar, a 28-year-old Californian who died of a preexisting medical condition, and Steve Pierce, a 50-year-old Californian who died of a heart attack. In February 2011, a man drowned in a Farles Prairie pond during a regional Rainbow Gathering in Ocala National Forest, Florida.

In 2015, at a regional gathering at Apalachicola National Forest in Florida, 24-year-old attendee Wesley "Dice" Jones was shot and paralyzed by Clark Mayers, 39, of Milledgeville, Georgia. Another attendee, Jacob Cardwell, known as "Smiley", threw himself over Dice and was himself shot and killed. Other gathering attendees then beat and stabbed Mayers, who spent two weeks in the hospital before being moved to jail, where he was charged with first-degree murder. Authorities ordered the encampment vacated. The group complied after holding a prayer meeting.

In July 2018, Joseph Bryan Capstraw, 20, was arrested in Elizabethtown, Kentucky, after confessing to the murder of a woman he met at a Rainbow Gathering in Lumpkin County, Georgia, the week before. Police say the woman, identified as 18-year-old Amber Robinson of Florida, hitchhiked with Capstraw after leaving the Gathering and was beaten to death by him after an altercation.

In February 2021, Larry "Frank" Dugger, who was attending a Rainbow Gathering at the Ocala National Forest, was shot and killed by an unknown assailant.

== Gatherings outside the United States ==
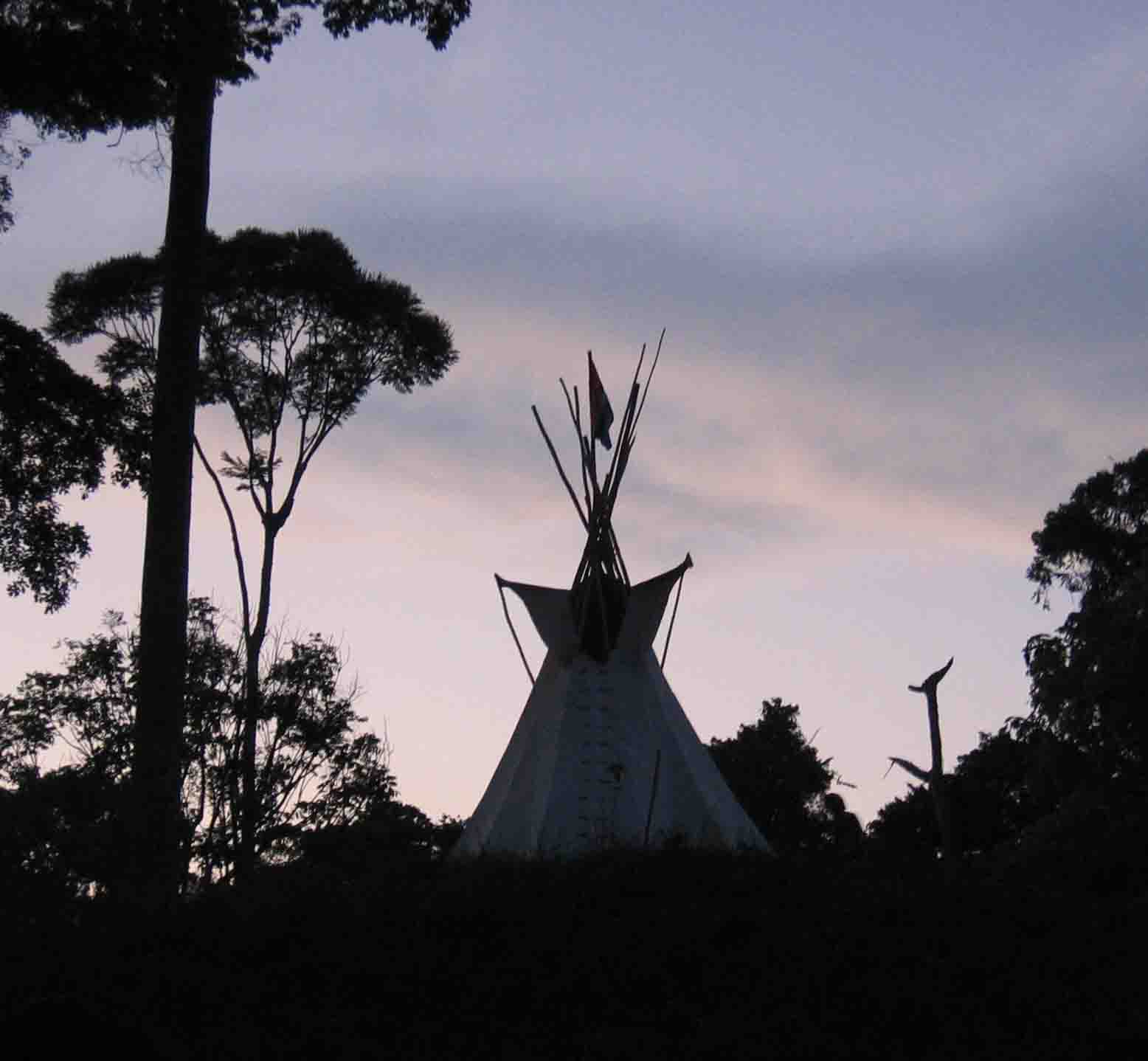
The Québec tipi at the World Gathering in Costa Rica, 2004

Gatherings are routinely held all over the world, on every continent except Antarctica.

=== European gatherings ===
There is an annual European gathering and many European countries host their own national or regional gatherings. The first European Rainbow Gathering was organized in 1983 in Val Campo, Ticino, Switzerland. The 2007 European gathering, the 25th recurrence of that annual event, took place in Bosnia-Herzegovina. The subsequent European Gatherings took place in Serbia (2008), Ukraine (2009) and Finland (2010). In 2010, there were also two Rainbow Gatherings in the Canary Islands, Spain. The first was held near the northern coast of La Palma and the second was held on Gran Canaria. The 2011 Gathering was in Portugal, 2012 in Slovakia, 2013 in Greece, the 2014 gathering in Romania, the 2015 gathering in Lithuania, 2016 in the Alps, 2017 in Italy, 2018 in Poland, 2019 in Sweden. The 2020 European Gathering took place in Estonia. In 2021 the gathering was held in France.

Note that the 2017 gathering in Italy was connected to several typhoid cases in France, Germany, and Slovenia.

=== World gatherings ===
The vision of the World Rainbow Family was manifested in Salto in 1996 at the European Gathering .The vision is to unite the tribes of Earth in the pursuit of World Peace . This vision was then carried first to South Africa then to India and finally it was held in 2000 in Australia. World Gatherings have been held in Australia, Zimbabwe, Brazil, Costa Rica, Canada, Turkey, Thailand, China, New Zealand, Argentina, Guatemala, Mexico, Hungary, Egypt, Ethiopia, Indonesia, Taiwan, and Colombia. Approximately 3,000 people attended the 2000 World Gathering in Australia, held on farmland in Boonoo Boonoo State Forest, in northern New South Wales. The 2009 World Gathering was held outside Murchison, New Zealand, 2011 in Argentina, 2012 it began in Brazil, where the gatherers caravaned to Guatemala and completed the second half of the WRG, carrying their vision counsel finally to Palenque, Mexico. In 2013, it was once again held in Canada, on Vancouver Island in the western province of British Columbia. 2014 WRG was in Hungary. 2015 WRG was in Egypt, Sinai. 2016 in Ethiopia. World Rainbow Gathering May 2017 was at Jengglungharjo, Indonesia. 2018 World Rainbow Gathering was in Hualien county in Taiwan. 2019 World Rainbow Gathering was in Chimila, in the Sierra Nevadas of Colombia. The 2020 World Rainbow Gathering was to be in Siberia, Russia, but was postponed to 2021. In 2021 due to travel restrictions upon entering Russia the vision council decided to make it in December in Mexico. The October 2022 World Rainbow Gathering was held in the southwest of Turkey followed by Nepal. The consensus made at the council was for the 2024 gathering to be held in the Ivory Coast in Africa .

Intergalactic Gatherings have also been held in Mexico and in Egypt (the first in Palenque and the last in Al Magroon dragon mountain) in 2022 where the Mayan calendar was adopted by consensus. . Unofficially it was 10 years after 2012.

== See also ==
- Peace, love, unity and respect – Principles of rave culture
- Counterculture of the 1960s
