= Milo McIver State Park =

State park in Oregon, United States

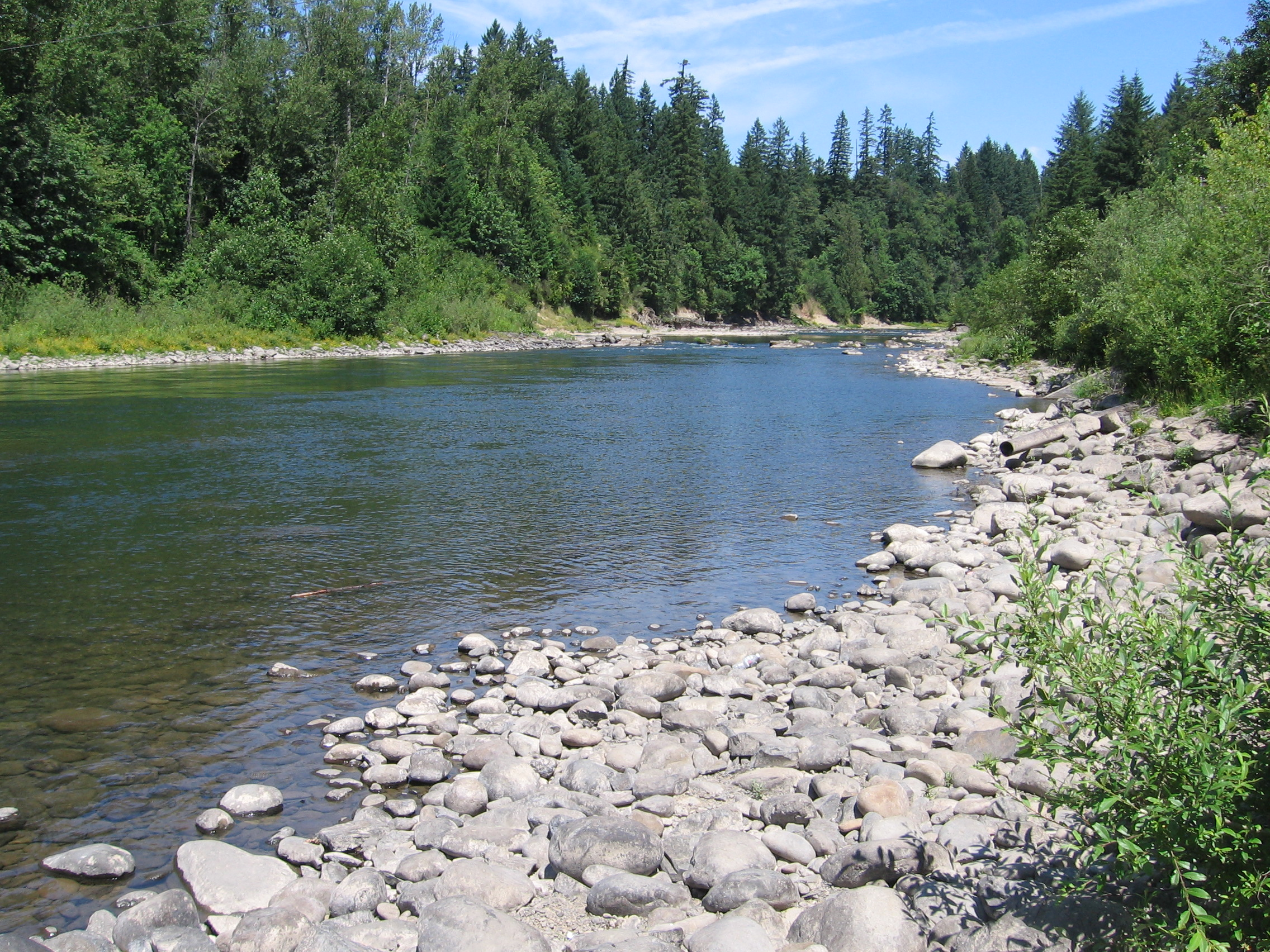
- Clackamas River flowing through Milo McIver State Park

- Location within Oregon Location within the United States
- Type: Public, state
- Location: Clackamas County, Oregon
- Nearest city: Oregon City
- Coordinates: 45°18′21″N 122°22′24″W
- Operator: Oregon Parks and Recreation Department

Milo McIver State Park is a state park in the U.S. state of Oregon. It is in Clackamas County along the Clackamas River, near Estacada and close to Mount Hood.

== History ==
The park was named in honor of Milo K. McIver. McIver was an Oregon Highway Commission member from April 1, 1950, to March 31, 1962, and commission chairman from April 1, 1958, to March 31, 1962. McIver set a record for long service with the commission. His 12-year term exceeded by a year and a half that of Ben R. Chandler. His facility in the fields of realty, property management, financing and industrial development were instrumental in investing nearly $1 billion on about 1,000 miles (1,600 km) of new highway. During his term as chairman, Oregon led all other states in opening interstate freeways.

In 1970, the park was the site of Vortex I, a government-sponsored music festival.

== Flora and fauna ==
The park contains a colony of Townsend's big-eared bats, considered a sensitive species in Oregon.

The largest Yew in Oregon is located in the park.

== Amenities ==
The park has many amenities for various activities, including day use and overnight camping, primitive camp sites, hiking and horse trails, boating, bird watching and a disc golf course. The equestrian trail system and facilities include: a very large parking area, portable toilets, a covered picnic area, a handicapped mounting ramp, a regular mounting block, an outdoor warm-up arena, a small round pen, and several training stations along the upper trail loop. The stations include: a teeter-totter bridge, a suspension bridge, a farm gate, a back through chute, a "mountain trail" area with small boulders, roots, and logs to step through, two large logs to cross and sidepass, a small water crossing, concrete cavaletti to cross, a two-tiered step-up box, and an 18-by-18-inch (46 by 46 cm) balance beam, 36 feet (11 m) long, with a 20-degree bend in the middle. There are also two small bridges over small streams. The park's master plan calls for the construction of a horse camping area as well.
