= Ostsiedlung in Pomerania =

Beginning in the 12th century, on the initiative of monasteries, as well as the local nobility, German settlers began migrating to Pomerania in a process later termed the Ostsiedlung. The local nobles and rulers encouraged the settlement in order to strengthen and consolidate their position and to develop and intensify land use, while the settlers were attracted by the privileges that were granted to them.

Through a process that spanned three hundred years, in western Pomerania the local Slavic population was mostly assimilated, while in the eastern part, Slavic Kashubians and Slovincians held on to their ethnic culture and identity.

== Rural settlement ==
Before the Ostsiedlung, Pomerania was rather sparsely settled. Around 1200, a relatively dense population could be found on the islands of Rügen, Usedom and Wollin/Wolin, around the gards (towns) of Stettin/Szczecin, Köslin/Koszalin, Pyritz/Pyrzyce (Pyritzer Weizacker) and Stargard, around the Persante/Parsęta river (Kolberg/Kołobrzeg area), the lower Peene river, and between Schlawe and the Leba valley. Largely unsettled were the hilly regions and the woods in the South. The 12th century warfare, especially the Danish raids, depopulated many areas of Pomerania and caused severe population drops in others (e.g. Usedom). At the turn to the 13th century, only isolated German settlements existed, e.g. Hohenkrug and other German villages, and the merchant's settlement near the Stettin castle. In contrast, the monasteries were almost exclusively run by Germans and Danes.

The first German and Danish settlers arrived since the 1170s and settled in the Peene area, the Uckermark, the Stettin area and southern Pomerania.

Significant German settlement started in the first half of the 13th century. Ostsiedlung was a common process at this time in all Central Europe and was largely run by the nobles and monasteries to increase their income. Also, the settlers were expected to finish and secure the conversion of the non-nobles to Christianity. In addition, the Danes withdrew from most of Pomerania in 1227, leaving the duchy vulnerable to their expansive neighbors, especially Mecklenburg, Brandenburg, and Henry I of Silesia.

Germans, at this early stage (before 1240), were often settled in frontier regions, such as the mainland part of the Principality of Rugia (after prince Jaromar I granted Eldena Abbey the right to call in settlers in 1209), Circipania, the lands of Loitz (administered semi-independently by Detlev of Gadebush), the Uckermark, the lands of Kolbatz Abbey and Bahn (which later was granted to the Knights Templar), and the area north of the Warthe and along the lower Oder river. However, in many of these frontiers, German settlement did not hinder the advance of Pomerania's neighbors.

About 1240, the areas of Stavenhagen and Pyritz were subject to German settlement. About 1250, large scale settlement took place also in Central Western Pomerania (County of Gützkow, lands of Meseritz, Ploth, Ziethen and Groswin), and the Stargard area (where settlement was encouraged already since 1229). In the 1260s, settlement started in the Cammin area, and in the virtually unpopulated lands of Naugard, Massow and Daber. The Ueckermünde and the Oder mouth areas were also settled at about 1260, but the Ueckermünde heath and the woodlands on both sides of the Oder Lagoon remained untouched. In the areas adjacted to the Peenestrom (the lands of Wusterhusen and Lassan) local Slavs participated in the German settlement which started in the 1260s. Settlement of the areas centered on the upper Rega river, previously unsettled, started in the 1250s, and reached a peak in the 1280s. The lower Rega area around Greifenberg and Treptow an der Rega was settled about the same period, but here a native Slavic population participated. In the Persante area, first German settlements occurred about 1260, but a more extensive settlement did not start before 1280. On the islands of Usedom and Wollin, only isolated settlement took place in the 13th century, e.g. in the Garz (Usedom) and Kaseburg area, where Germans settled already in the 1240s, and in proximity of the German town of Wollin. The local Grobe Abbey did, in contrast to the other Pomeranian monasteries, not enhance German settlement. Therefore, Slavic culture on the isles persisted and vanished only in the late 14th century. The island of Rügen, in contrast to the German mainland parts of the principality, also retained a Slavic character throughout the 13th century - German settlement would only start in the 14th century, with strong participation of local Slavs. In Schlawe-Stolp, German settlement started in the 1260s, and was promoted by the Belbuck Abbey. A large influx of settlers to the western parts of Schlawe-Stolp took place after 1270—first settlers were called to the Stolp area in the 1280s. Here, local Slavs participated in the Ostsiedlung, and settlement went on throughout the 14th century.

Initially, the Germans who settled the northern regions of the Pomeranian duchy predominantly came from Lower Saxony, while the Germans who settled the southern areas (mittelpommerscher Keil) predominantly came from Altmark and Westphalia. This caused the emergence of East Pomeranian, Central Pomeranian and Mecklenburgisch-Vorpommersch dialects. German settlers also came from areas earlier affected by Ostsiedlung, such as Mecklenburg, Brandenburg, and later also German settled regions of Pomerania herself. The Slavic dialects disappeared, with the exception that fishermen from the isles and the Oder lagoon area continued to use Wendish for a relatively long period.

Besides the Slovincian area, the last records of a Slavic language in the Duchy of Pomerania are from the 16th century: In the Oder area, a few Slavic fishing villages are recorded, and east of Kolberg and Köslin, a more numerous Slavic-speaking population must have existed, as can be concluded from a 1516 decree forbidding the use of the Slavic language at the Köslin market.

Villages before the Ostsiedlung were of the Haufendorf type; the houses were built close to each other without a special ruling. A variant of this type also found in Pomerania is the Sackgassendorf (or Sackdorf) type, where a dead-end road leads to those houses. This type evolved as an extension of Haufendorf villages. German settlement introduced new types of villages: In the Hagenhufendorf type, houses were built on both sides of a main road, each within its own hide (German: Hagen). Those villages were usually set up after the clearance of woodlands; most of them were given German names in absence of any Slavic site names. This type of village can be found all along the coast, most of them in the areas between Barth and Wolgast, Kolberg and Köslin, and north and west of Schlawe. Other villages were built in the Angerdorf type, where a main street fork encloses a large meadow ("Anger") in the village's center where the livestock was kept at night; sometimes the church or other buildings not used for living were built on the Anger also. This type is the most prominent type in the Peene, lower Oder, Pyritz, Lake Madü and Rega areas, and many villages of this type are also found in the Kolberg and Schlawe area. In addition to these types, the Straßendorf type, characterized by a single and very long main street, was introduced in a later stage of Ostsiedlung, and therefore is found predominantly in areas that were affected last by the German settlement (easternmost parts, Cammin area). Villages of this type were either new construction, or extensions of Slavic precursors. In other areas, Hagenhufendorf and Angerdorf types dominate, while the Haufendorf type used in Slavic times and its Sackdorf variant can still be found in between, predominantly on the islands.

The villages' area was divided in hides. The size of a hide differed between the village types: A Hagenhufe, used in the Hagenhufendorf villages, comprised 60 Morgen (Latin: iugera), about 40 hectares. A Landhufe, used in the Angerdorf villages, comprised 30 Morgen. One farm would usually have an area of one Hagenhufe or two Landhufen. Slavic farmland was measured in Haken (Latin: uncus), with one Haken equaling 15 Morgen (half a Landhufe). Haken were used only in villages remaining under old Slavic law (predominantly on the islands), whereas Hufen were used for new villages placed under German law (in Pomerania sometimes referred to as Schwerin Law). Not all families of German villages owned a Hufe. Those dwelling on considerably smaller property ("gardens") were usually hired as workers by the farmers (German: Vollbauern). These people were termed "gardeners" (German: Gärtner) or Kossäten (literally "who sits in a hut"), and could either be local Slavs or the younger sons of German farmers who did not inherit their father's soil.

In southern Pomerania, villages were larger than in the North (50 to 60 Hufen compared to 10 to 20 Hufen), also the farm size varied with a typical farm in the South (Pyritz area) being 2 to 3 Hufen and at the coast one Hufe.

== Foundation of towns ==
Before the Ostsiedlung, urban settlements of the emporia and gard types existed for example the city of Szczecin (Stettin) which counted between 5,000 and 9,000 inhabitants, and other locations like Demmin, Wolgast, Usedom, Wollin/Wolin, Kolberg/Kołobrzeg, Pyritz/Pyrzyce and Stargard, though many of the coastal ones declined during the 12th century warfare. Previous theories that urban development was "in its entirety" brought to areas such as Pomerania, Mecklenburg or Poland by Germans are now discarded, and studies show that these areas had already growing urban centres in process similar to Western Europe These population centres were usually centered around a gard, which was a fortified castle which housed the castellan as well as his staff and the ducal craftsmen. The surrounding town consisted of suburbs, inhabited by merchants, clergy and the higher nobles. According to Piskorski this portion usually included "markets, taverns, butcher shops, mints, which also exchanged coins, toll stations, abbeys, churches and the houses of nobles".

Important changes connected to Ostsiedlung included

- location: All Ostsiedlung towns in Pomerania except for Stettin, Wollin and probably Kammin were founded on empty space, even if they were located near Slavic settlements. Piskorski (1997) says that for the towns with a Slavic predecessor, "usually, the settlement from the west did not only mean granting German law and a new administration, but also the shift of the old settlement location, because the new German-law town emerged not at the place, but in the vicinity of the old center, whereby sometimes the distance between them was several kilometers as e.g. in the case of Pomeranian Kolberg." By leaving the Slavic settlement untouched, the landlord not only avoided dealing with complicated property rights inside, but also kept the services and income generated by its dependent population. Piskorski also says there were isolated exceptions as in the case of Stettin and Wollin, where pre-existing settlements were integrated into the new town: "In such cases, the old settlements were surveyed anew and built anew." Benl (1999) likewise says that Wollin/Wolin and probably Kammin/Kamień Pomorski were exceptional in that they were built on the spot of former, yet decayed settlements, and that Stettin was exceptional in that two German settlements, set up close to the Slavic castle and settlement, were included in the later town. Likewise, Mangelsdorf (1990) says that the cities in Mecklenburg-Vorpommern "have their roots in the slavonic period, and usually came up near a slavonic castle or settlement with a commercial background." Mangelsdorf further says that "new in-town excavations illustrate the connection between slavonic and german settlements and the influence of material culture. [...] Slavic material culture, especially pottery, died [...] in Mecklenburg-Antepomerania at the end of the 13th century."
- population: Germans formed a majority in the towns from the beginning. They moved in either directly from the West or from the surrounding areas. People of Slavic descent also lived in the towns, but primarily in suburbs (Wieken) outside the walls, which were either continuations of pre-existing Slavic settlements (many of those were soon abandoned) or new foundations owned by the landlord. Since around 1300, the towns acquired these Wieken. A small number of Jews also settled in medieval Pomeranian towns.
- legal status: Prior to the Ostsiedlung, all inhabitants of the duchy were subject to ducal law, meaning that distinct sets of laws were applied to individuums according to their descent, regardless whether they lived in large or small settlements. In contrast, German town law was granted to the inhabitants of Ostsiedlung towns, making their inhabitants personally free and subject to the town's jurisdiction. This however did not apply to resident clergymen and vassals of the duke. Many towns were able to expand the privileges and freedoms gained by their foundation in the following years.
- social differentiation: The upper class in the Ostsiedlung towns were the patricians, who were primarily occupied with long-distance trade and dominated the town's council.
- layout: The towns were set up with regular streets resembling a checkerboard-like pattern. The shape of the town was either oval (e.g. Bahn), rectangular with rounded corners (e.g. Greifenhagen) or rectangular (e.g. Treptow); Altdamm was built in a circular and Pyritz in a triangular shape. In the center was the market place with the townhall.

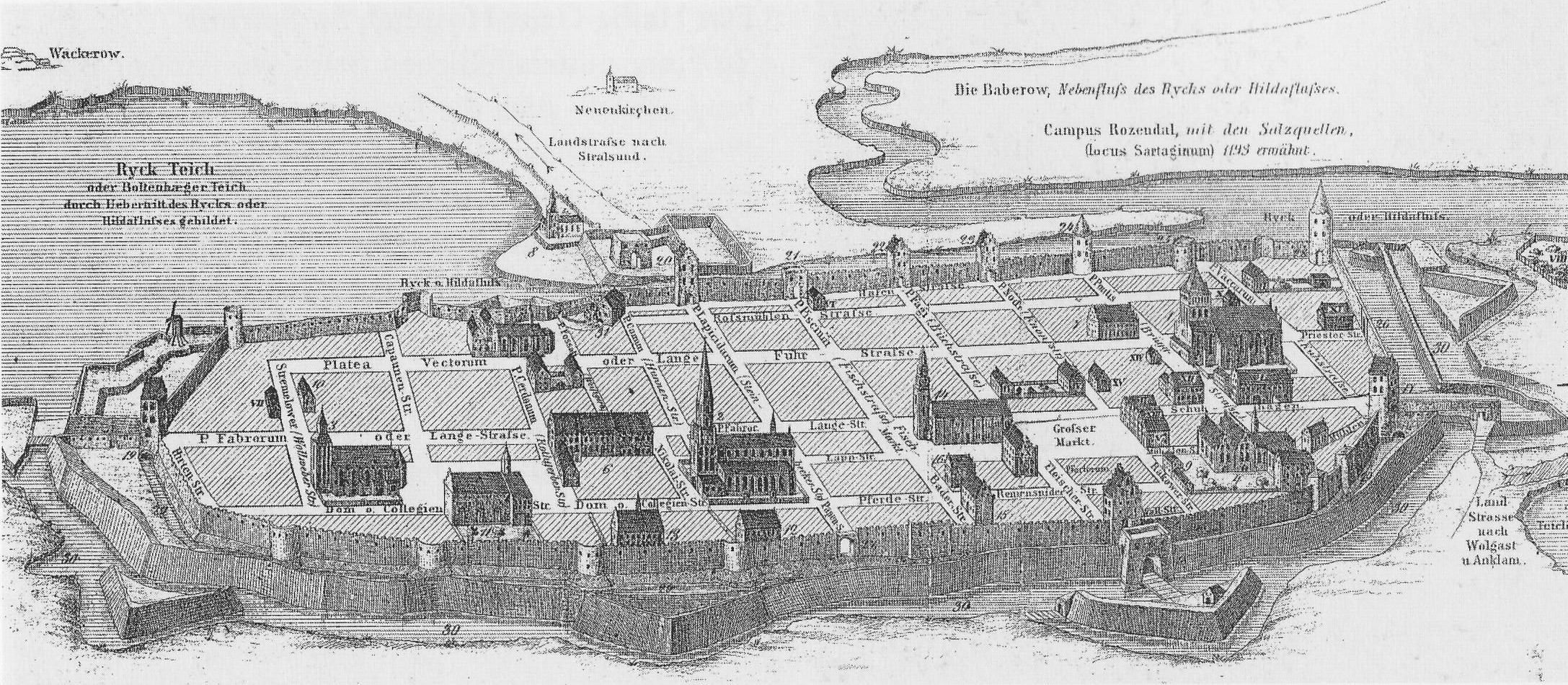
Medieval Greifswald with the checkerboard-type layout typical for Ostsiedlung towns. Locators set up rectangular blocs in an area resembling an oval with a central market, and organized the settlement.

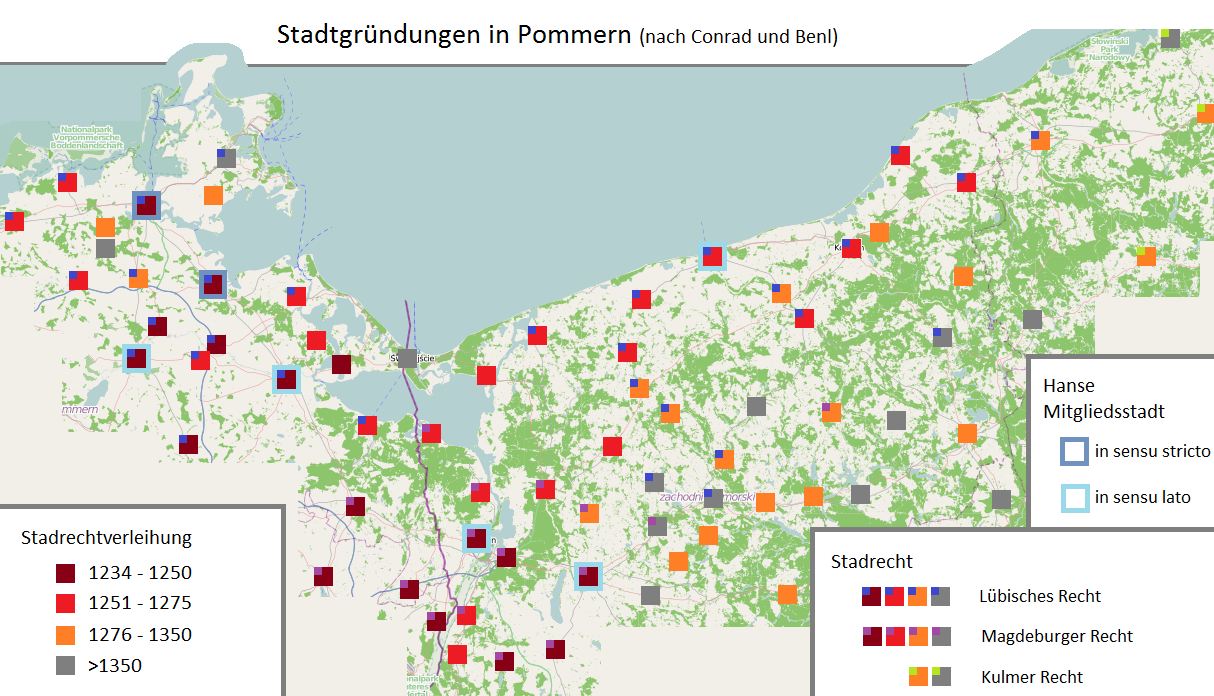
"Foundation" of towns in the area of the later Pomeranian province, superimposed on OSM. Most towns with Lübeck law appealed to Greifswald, most towns with Magdeburg law to Stettin.

Between 1234 and 1299, 34 towns were "founded" in the Pomeranian duchy, this number increased to 58 in the late Middle Ages. The towns were built on behalf of the Pomeranian dukes or ecclesiastic bodies like monasteries and orders. Most prominent on this issue was Barnim I of Pomerania-Stettin, who since was entitled "the towns' founder". The towns build on his behalf were granted Magdeburg Law and settled predominantly by people from the western Margraviate of Brandenburg, while the towns founded in the North (most on behalf of the Rugian princes and Wartislaw III of Pomerania-Demmin were granted Lübeck Law and were settled predominantly by people from Lower Saxony. The first towns were Stralsund (Principality of Rügen, 1234), Prenzlau (Uckermark, then Pomerania-Stettin, 1234), Bahn (Knights Templar, about 1234), and Stettin (1237/43), Gartz (Oder) (Pomerania-Stettin, 1240), and Loitz (by Detlev of Gadebusch, 1242). Other towns built in the 1240s were Demmin, Greifswald (by Eldena Abbey), Altentreptow.

In the 1250s followed Anklam, Altdamm, Pyritz, probably already Stargard and Grimmen, Greifenhagen, Barth (Principality of Rügen, before 1255), and Damgarten (Principality of Rügen, 1258). In the 1260s followed Wollin (1260), Ueckermünde, Wolgast, probably already Gützkow, Pölitz (1260), Greifenberg (1262), Gollnow, probably already Usedom, Penkun, Tribsees (Principality of Rügen, before 1267) and Naugard (by the bishop of Cammin, before 1268). In the 1270s followed Cammin (1274), Massow (by the bishop of Cammin, 1274), Pasewalk (recorded in 1274, founded probably in the 1250s), Plathe (1277), Lassan (between 1264 and 1278), Rügenwalde (by Wizlaw II of Rügen), Regenwalde (1279/80), Labes (about 1280), and Treptow an der Rega (between 1277 and 1281). Neuwarp, Richtenberg, Belgard, and Werben (by the bishop of Cammin) are first recorded in 1295, 1297, 1299, and 1300, respectively, all were most certainly founded earlier.

In the area directly administered by the bishops of Cammin, the towns of Kolberg (1255), Köslin (1266), Körlin (early 14th century), and Bublitz (1340) were set up. The early 14th century saw the foundation of Stolp (by Waldemar of Brandenburg, 1310), Neustettin (by Wartislaw IV, 1310), Rügenwalde (again 1312, the 1270s precursor had not done well), Rugendal (Principality of Rügen, before 1313, decayed), Schlawe (by the Swenzones, 1317), Garz (by the princes of Rügen, 1320s), Jacobshagen (by three brothers von Stegelitz, 1336), Freienwalde (by von Wedel, before 1338), Zanow (by the Swenzones, 1343), Lauenburg (by the Teutonic Knights, 1341), Bütow (by the Teutonic Knights, 1346), and Fiddichow (by Barnim III, 1347).

According to Rădvan (2010), "a relevant example for how towns were founded (civitas libera) is Prenzlau today within German boundaries, close to Poland. It was here that, a short distance from an older Slavic settlement, duke Barnim I of Pomerania entrusted in 1234-35 the creation of a new settlement to eight contractors (referred to as fondatores) originating from Stendal, Saxony. The eight, who were probably relatives to some degree, were granted 300 Hufen (around 4800 ha) that were to be distributed to settlers, each one of the fondatores being entitled to 160 ha for himself and the right to build mills; one of them became the duke's representative. The settlers' land grant was tax exempt for three years, and it was to be kept in eternal and hereditary possession. A 1.5 km (1 mi) perimeter around the settlement was provided for unrestricted use by the community of pastures, forests, or fishing. Those trading were dispensed of paying taxes for land under ducal authority. Without being mentioned in the founding act, the old Slavic community persisted as nothing more that a suburb to the new town. Aside from several topical variations, many settlements in medieval Poland and other areas followed a similar pattern."

Many towns with a gard in close proximity had the duke level the castle when they grew in power. Stettin, where the castle was inside the town, had the duke level it already in 1249, other towns were to follow. The fortified new towns had succeeded the gards as strongholds for the country's defense. In many cases, the former Slavic settlement would become a suburb of the German town ("Wiek", "Wieck"). In Stettin, two "Wiek" suburbs were set up anew outside the walls, to which most Slavs from within the walls were resettled. Such Wiek settlements did initially not belong to the town, but to the duke, although they were likely to come into possession of the town in the course of the 14th century. Also in the 14th century, Slavic Wiek suburbs lost their Slavic character.

== Scandinavian participation ==
In western Pomerania, including Rugia, the process of Ostsiedlung differed from how it took place in other parts of Eastern Europe in that a high proportion of the settlers was composed of Scandinavians, especially Danes, and migrants from Scania. The highest Danish influence was on the Ostsiedlung of the then Danish Rugian principality. In the possessions of the Rugian Eldena Abbey, a Danish establishment, settlers who opened a tavern would respectively be treated according to Danish, German and Wendish law.

Wampen, Ladebow, and other villages near Greifswald are of Danish origin. Yet, many Scandinavian settlers in the Pomeranian towns were of German origin, moving from older German merchants' settlements in Sweden to the newly founded towns at the Southern Baltic shore.

== Ethnic relations ==
According to Piskorski (1999), "the Pomeranian duchies would not have survived the political storms and wars in the 13th and 14th centuries without the settlement processes, which strengthened them internally. Piskorski says that there are no records of ethnic violence in the duchy during this period, not even during social conflicts in towns, and concludes that it was not ethnic, but social differences that led to conflicts.

Bialecki (1991) writes that by the 14th century, the German merchants in the major towns of the region enacted laws which aimed to discriminate against the native Slavic population. These included restrictions on membership in the guilds, public use of Slavic languages, and double taxation of non-German merchants. During the 14th century Slavic landowners were often expropriated and their lands turned over to German colonists. As a result the process of Germanization accelerated in the late thirteen and fourteen hundreds.

According to Bialecki, to the west of the Oder river the Slavic Wends were assimilated and by 1300 ethnic Germans constituted about 50% of the population in this area. On the right bank of the river these development occurred later; in the area from Stettin/Szczecin eastward, the number of German settlers at the end of the 12th century was still insignificant. Even by the 1230s, the number of lay German speaking inhabitants of the area numbered no more than 300 persons. Bialecki refers for these numbers to Sommerfeld (1896, p. 126: "several hundreds, at most a thousand" lay Germans), Kaczmarczyk (1945) and Dziewulski (1946). Bialecki writes that this has been sometimes recognized by German historiography, which traditionally had exaggerated the degree of German colonization in Pomerania during this period. Bialecki quotes the German historian Martin Wehrmann (1904), who said that "around 1300 AD, Pomerania was eventually not yet a really German area; to the contrary: then, the Slavic population was still superior in numbers, but in decisive decline. Pushed back by the new immigrants everywhere [...]" Bialecki also refers to another quote, where Wehrmann said that "to the east, on the other side of the Persante [Parseta] river, next to neighboring Poland, Slavic language, culture, customs and at the beginning probably paganism as well, continued to exist for centuries. There, Slavdom was perhaps never completely broken. Else, the victory of Germandom was decided by 1300."

According to Rudolf Benl (1999), Western Pomerania and the larger part of Farther Pomerania up to Köslin were Germanized by 1300, and that in the process of Ostsiedlung, due to a "significant population surplus", German settlers arriving from outside the duchy were soon outnumbered by German settlers already born in Pomerania who then colonized its more eastern areas. Benl says that "the population of the Pomeranian and Rugian towns was German from the beginning, although supposedly in every town there was a more or less minor number of inhabitants of Slavic descent," and that "the assimilation of the Slavs required a significant prevalence in the numbers of Germans in the countryside, too." Benl says that "it is impossible to determine an exact numerical proportion [of Slavs and Germans] for the whole area" from the sources, but that "all sources suggest a significant prevalence of Germans. The high proportion of Slavic toponyms in Pomerania must not lead to wrong conclusions; by far most of the villages 'located' exclusively or predominantly with German settlers kept their Slavic name, and very many villages founded ex nihilo were named in Slavic."

According to Labuda, in the western portion of Pomerania, the population balance of German colonists relative to original Kashubian and Lutici inhabitants was 1 to 9 - Germanization didn't occur until the 14th and 15th centuries.

In the eastern regions of Pomerania, Germanization took place much later. Johannes Bugenhagen wrote that at the beginning of the 16th century the German-Slavic language border was near Köslin. During the 17th century, the border between areas with mostly German-speaking and mostly Slavic-speaking populations ran more or less along the present-day border between West Pomeranian and Pomeranian Voivodeships.

In year 1612, cartographer Eilhard Lubinus – while working on his map of Pomerania – travelled from the direction of Pollnow towards Treblin on his way to Danzig. While staying in the manor house of Stanislaus Stenzel von Puttkamer in Treblin, he noted in his diary: "we have entered Slavic-inhabited lands, which has surprised us a lot." Later, while returning from Gdańsk to Stettin, Lubinus slept over in Großendorf near Stolp, and noted: "in the whole village, we cannot find even one German-speaker" (which caused communication problems).

Over a century later, in 1772–1778, the area was visited by Johann Bernoulli. He noted that villages owned by Otto Christoph von Podewils – such as Dochow, Zipkow and Warbelin – were inhabited entirely by Slavic-speakers. He also noted that local priests and nobles were making great efforts to weed out the Slavic language and turn their subjects into Germans. Brüggemann in 1779 wrote that the area to the east of Lupow river was inhabited by "pure-blood Wends", while to the west of this river some rural areas were inhabited by already half-Germanised "Wendischdeutsche".

Piskorski (1999) estimated that there might have been about a thousand Germans in the Pomeranian duchy by 1230, that the Germanization of the Rugian principality was complete in the beginning 15th century, and of the western part of the Pomeranian duchy up to Kolberg essentially in the beginning 16th century, whereas a Köslin law of 1516 indicated the presence of a significant Slavic-speaking population in the east. According to Piskorski, "we know the starting point of the ethnic processes and their result. Unfortunately, science can not tell much about their causes and their exact course."
