= Główczyce railway station =

Non-operational railway station in Główczyce, Poland

Główczyce

General information
- Location: Główczyce; Poland
- Coordinates: 54.617686°N 17.378596°E
- Owner: Polskie Koleje Państwowe S.A.
- Platforms: None

Construction
- Structure type: Building: No; Depot: No; Water tower: No

History
- Former names: Glowitz
Location

Główczyce is a non-operational PKP railway station in Główczyce (Pomeranian Voivodeship), Poland.

== Lines crossing the station ==
Start station	End station	Line type
Słupsk	Cecenowo	Dismantled
