= Żoruchowo railway station =

Railway station in Żoruchowo, Poland

Żoruchowo

General information
- Location: Żoruchowo; Poland
- Coordinates: 54°35′5.6″N 17°09′37.5″E
- Owner: Polskie Koleje Państwowe S.A.
- Platforms: None

Construction
- Structure type: Building: No; Depot: No; Water tower: No

History
- Former names: Sarchow
Location

Żoruchowo is a non-operational PKP railway station in Żoruchowo (Pomeranian Voivodeship), Poland.

== Lines crossing the station ==
Start station	End station	Line type
Słupsk	Cecenowo	Dismantled
