= Dargoleza railway station =

Railway station in Dargoleza, Poland

Dargoleza

General information
- Location: Dargoleza; Poland
- Coordinates: 54.6078°N 17.5067°E
- Owner: Polskie Koleje Państwowe S.A.
- Platforms: None

Construction
- Structure type: Building: Yes (no longer used); Depot: Pulled down Water tower: Pulled down

History
- Former names: Darger
Location

Dargoleza is a non-operational PKP railway station in Dargoleza (Pomeranian Voivodeship), Poland.

== Lines crossing the station ==
Start station	End station	Line type
Słupsk	Cecenowo	Dismantled
