= Klęcinko =

- Village
- Location within Poland
- Coordinates: 54°36′39″N 17°21′10″E
- Country: Poland
- Voivodeship: Pomeranian
- County: Słupsk
- Gmina: Główczyce, Klęcino
- Population: 120,000

Klęcinko [klɛnˈt͡ɕinkɔ] is a village in the administrative of Klęcino, within Słupsk County, Pomeranian Voivodeship, in northern Poland.

For the history of the region, see History of Pomerania.
