= Klęcino railway station =

Railway station in Poland

Klęcino

General information
- Location: Klęcino; Poland
- Coordinates: 54.611113°N 17.358844°E
- Owner: Polskie Koleje Państwowe S.A.
- Platforms: None

Construction
- Structure type: Building: No; Depot: No; Water tower: No

History
- Former names: Klenzin
Location

Klęcino is a non-operational PKP railway station in Klęcino (Pomeranian Voivodeship), Poland.

== Lines crossing the station ==
Start station	End station	Line type
Słupsk	Cecenowo	Dismantled
