= Będziechowo railway station =

Railway station in Będziechowo, Poland

Coordinates: 54°36′03″N 17°17′30″E

Będziechowo

General information
- Location: Będziechowo; Poland
- Owner: Polskie Koleje Państwowe S.A.
- Platforms: None

Construction
- Structure type: Building: No; Depot: No; Water tower: No

History
- Former names: Bendsechow
Location

Będziechowo is a non-operational PKP railway station in Będziechowo (Pomeranian Voivodeship), Poland.

== Lines crossing the station ==
Start station	End station	Line type
Słupsk	Cecenowo	Dismantled
