= Swiecino =

Swiecino may refer to:

- Świecino, Puck County, Poland
- Święcino, Słupsk County, Poland
