= Choćmirówko =

- Village
- Location within Poland
- Coordinates: 54°35′48″N 17°15′20″E
- Country: Poland
- Voivodeship: Pomeranian
- County: Słupsk
- Gmina: Główczyce

Population
  - Total: 120
- Postal code: 76-220
- Vehicle registration: GSL

Choćmirówko [xɔt͡ɕmiˈrufkɔ] (German: Neu Gutzmerow) is a village in the administrative district of Gmina Główczyce, within Słupsk County, Pomeranian Voivodeship, in northern Poland.
