= Mokre, Słupsk County =

Mokre
- Settlement
- Location within Poland
- Coordinates: 54°34′4″N 17°32′19″E
- Country: Poland
- Voivodeship: Pomeranian
- County: Słupsk
- Gmina: Główczyce

Mokre [ˈmɔkrɛ] is a settlement in the administrative district of Gmina Główczyce, within Słupsk County, Pomeranian Voivodeship, in northern Poland.

For the history of the region, see History of Pomerania.
