= Budki, Pomeranian Voivodeship =

Budki
- Village
- Location within Poland
- Coordinates: 54°38′44″N 17°32′59″E
- Country: Poland
- Voivodeship: Pomeranian
- County: Słupsk
- Gmina: Główczyce

Budki [ˈbutki] (German: Bottke) is a village in the administrative district of Gmina Główczyce, within Słupsk County, Pomeranian Voivodeship, in northern Poland.
