= Przebędowo Słupskie =

- Village
- Location within Poland
- Coordinates: 54°36′37″N 17°28′7″E
- Country: Poland
- Voivodeship: Pomeranian
- County: Słupsk
- Gmina: Główczyce
- Population: 91

Przebędowo Słupskie [pʂɛbɛnˈdɔvɔ ˈswupskʲɛ] is a village in the administrative district of Gmina Główczyce, within Słupsk County, Pomeranian Voivodeship, in northern Poland.

For the history of the region, see History of Pomerania.
