= Kokoszki, Pomeranian Voivodeship =

Kokoszki
- Settlement
- Location within Poland
- Coordinates: 54°34′26″N 17°32′39″E
- Country: Poland
- Voivodeship: Pomeranian
- County: Słupsk
- Gmina: Główczyce
- Population: 3

Kokoszki [kɔˈkɔʂki] is a settlement in the administrative district of Gmina Główczyce, within Słupsk County, Pomeranian Voivodeship, in northern Poland.

For the history of the region, see History of Pomerania.
