= Bukowski Młyn =

- Settlement
- Location within Poland
- Coordinates: 54°35′12″N 17°9′22″E
- Country: Poland
- Voivodeship: Pomeranian
- County: Słupsk
- Gmina: Główczyce

Bukowski Młyn (Polish: [buˈkɔfskʲi ˈmwɨn]) is a settlement in the administrative district of Gmina Główczyce, within Słupsk County, Pomeranian Voivodeship, in northern Poland.

For the history of the region, see History of Pomerania.
