= Szelewo =

- Village
- Location within Poland
- Coordinates: 54°34′49″N 17°27′49″E
- Country: Poland
- Voivodeship: Pomeranian
- County: Słupsk
- Gmina: Główczyce
- Population: 55

Szelewo [ʂɛˈlɛvɔ] is a village in the administrative district of Gmina Główczyce, within Słupsk County, Pomeranian Voivodeship, in northern Poland.

For the history of the region, see History of Pomerania.
