= Zgierz, Pomeranian Voivodeship =

Zgierz
- Village
- Location within Poland
- Coordinates: 54°38′30″N 17°23′40″E
- Country: Poland
- Voivodeship: Pomeranian
- County: Słupsk
- Gmina: Główczyce
- Population: 67

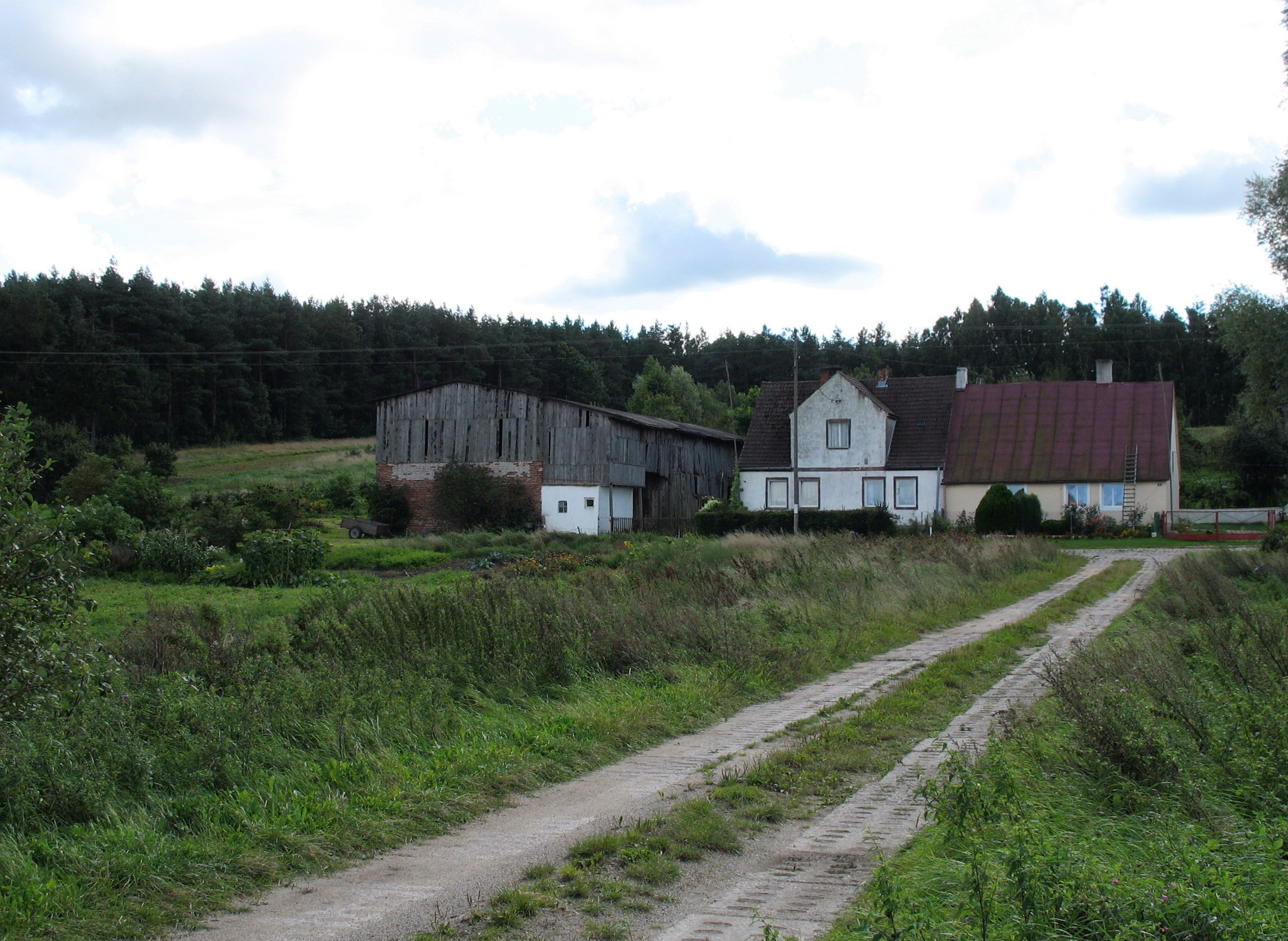

Zgierz [zɡʲɛʂ] is a village in the administrative district of Gmina Główczyce, within Słupsk County, Pomeranian Voivodeship, in northern Poland.

For the history of the region, see History of Pomerania.
