= Murowaniec, Pomeranian Voivodeship =

Murowaniec
- Settlement
- Location within Poland
- Coordinates: 54°34′41″N 17°10′55″E
- Country: Poland
- Voivodeship: Pomeranian
- County: Słupsk
- Gmina: Główczyce
- Population: 10 year 2,018

Murowaniec [murɔˈvaɲɛt͡s] is a settlement in the administrative district of Gmina Główczyce, within Słupsk County, Pomeranian Voivodeship, in northern Poland. It forms part of the sołectwo (administrative village unit) of Żelkowo.

For the history of the region, see History of Pomerania.
