= Wolinia =

- Village
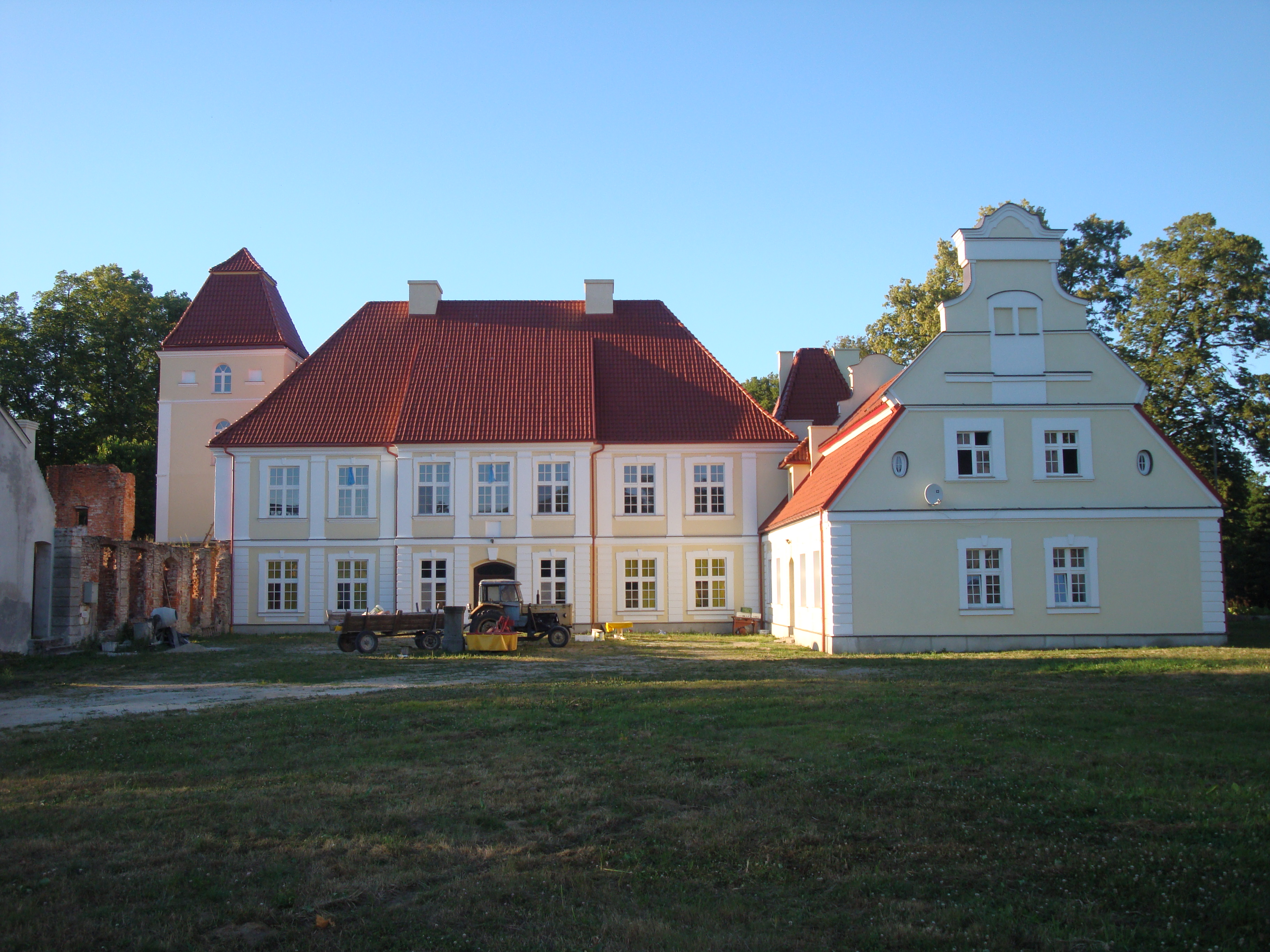
- Palace of family Puttkamer in Wolinia

- Location within Poland
- Coordinates: 54°36′56″N 17°32′20″E
- Country: Poland
- Voivodeship: Pomeranian
- County: Słupsk
- Gmina: Główczyce
- Population: 322

Wolinia [vɔˈliɲa] (German: Wollin) is a village in the administrative district of Gmina Główczyce, within Słupsk County, Pomeranian Voivodeship, in northern Poland.

Before 1648 the area was part of Duchy of Pomerania, and in 1648–1945 it belonged to Prussia (1648-1871), the German Empire (1871-1919), and the German Reich (1919-1945). For the history of the region, see History of Pomerania.

== Notable residents ==
- Georg-Dietrich von Puttkamer (1681-1754), German general

== Transport ==
- Wolinia railway station
