= Lipno, Pomeranian Voivodeship =

Lipno
- Village
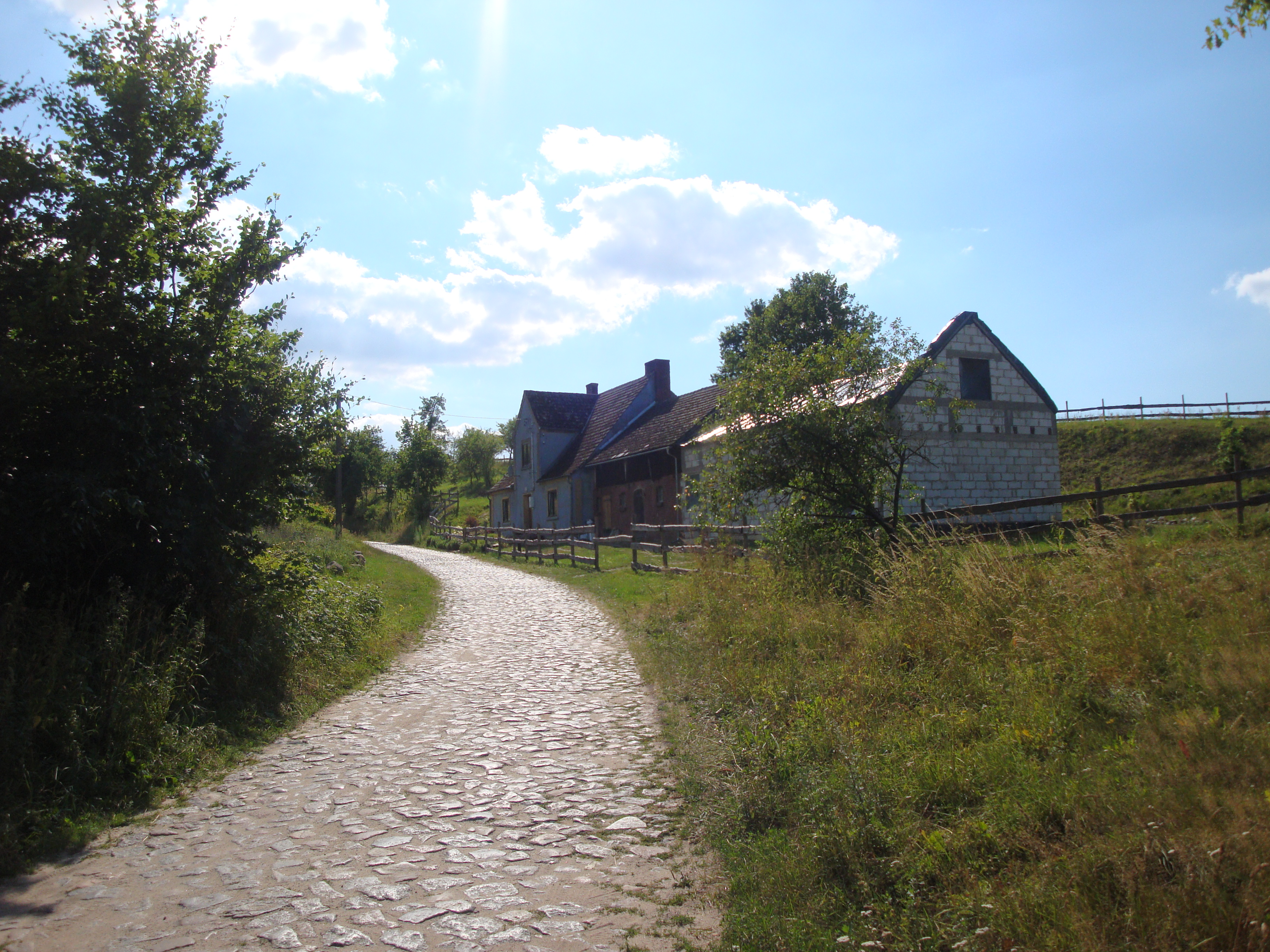

- Location within Poland
- Coordinates: 54°33′47″N 17°16′43″E
- Country: Poland
- Voivodeship: Pomeranian
- County: Słupsk
- Gmina: Główczyce
- Population: 23

Lipno (Polish: [ˈlipnɔ]; German: Liepen) is a village in the administrative district of Gmina Główczyce, within Słupsk County, Pomeranian Voivodeship, in northern Poland.

For the history of the region, see History of Pomerania.
