= Lisia Góra, Słupsk County =

Lisia Góra
- Village
- Location within Poland
- Coordinates: 54°40′14″N 17°23′56″E
- Country: Poland
- Voivodeship: Pomeranian
- County: Słupsk
- Gmina: Główczyce

Lisia Góra [ˈliɕa ˈɡura] is a village in the administrative district of Gmina Główczyce, within Słupsk County, Pomeranian Voivodeship, in northern Poland.

== See also ==
- History of Pomerania
