= Gatka, Słupsk County =

Gatka
- Village
- Location within Poland
- Coordinates: 54°38′22″N 17°30′2″E
- Country: Poland
- Voivodeship: Pomeranian
- County: Słupsk
- Gmina: Główczyce

Gatka (Polish: [ˈɡatka]) is a village in the administrative district of Gmina Główczyce, within Słupsk County, Pomeranian Voivodeship, in northern Poland.

For the history of the region, see History of Pomerania.
