= Górzyno =

- Village
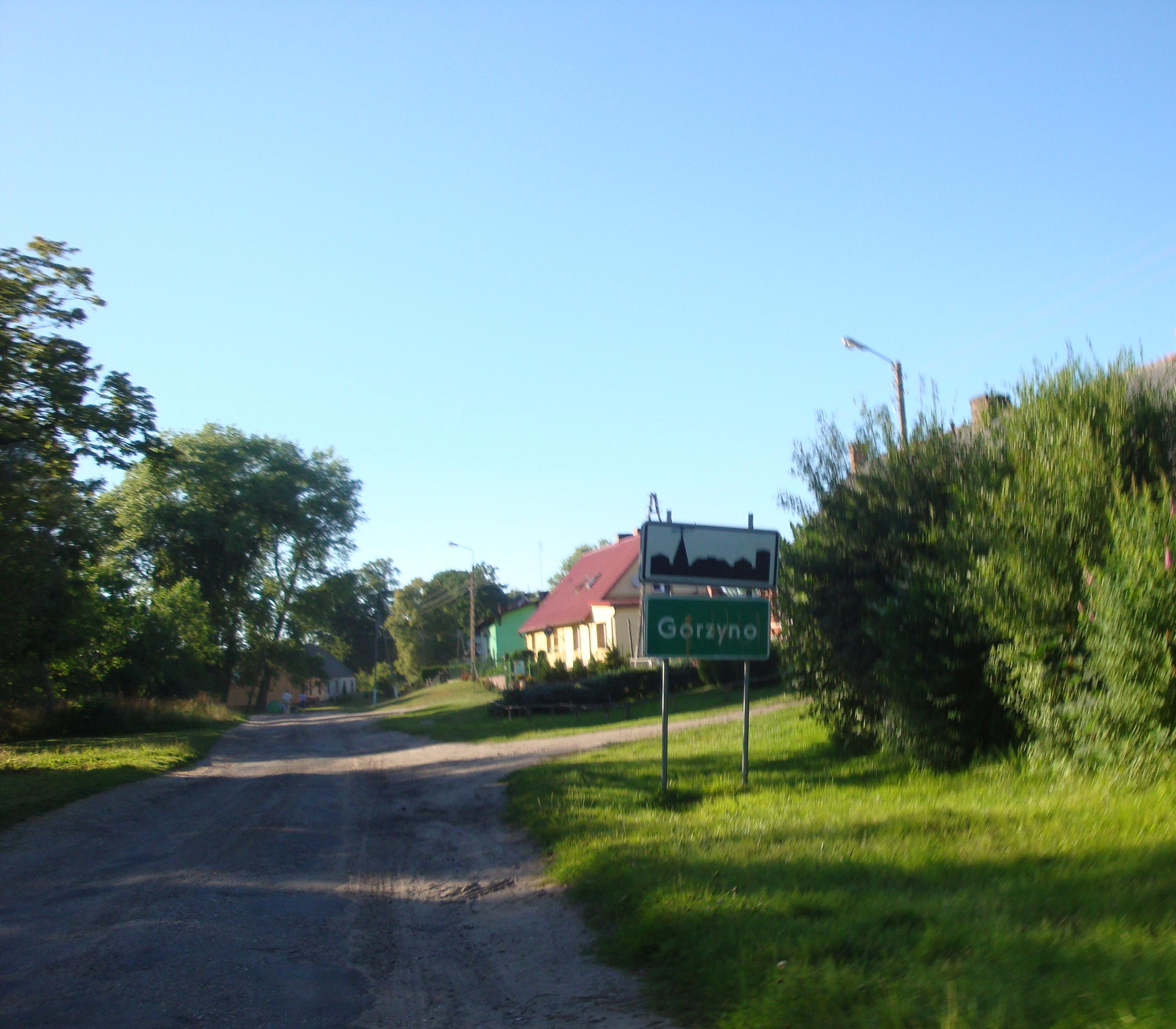
- Entrance to village

- Location within Poland
- Coordinates: 54°33′20″N 17°29′44″E
- Country: Poland
- Voivodeship: Pomeranian
- County: Słupsk
- Gmina: Główczyce
- Population: 332

Górzyno [ɡuˈʐɨnɔ] (German: Gohren) is a village in the administrative district of Gmina Główczyce, within Słupsk County, Pomeranian Voivodeship, in northern Poland.

For the history of the region, see History of Pomerania.
