= Skórzyno =

- Village
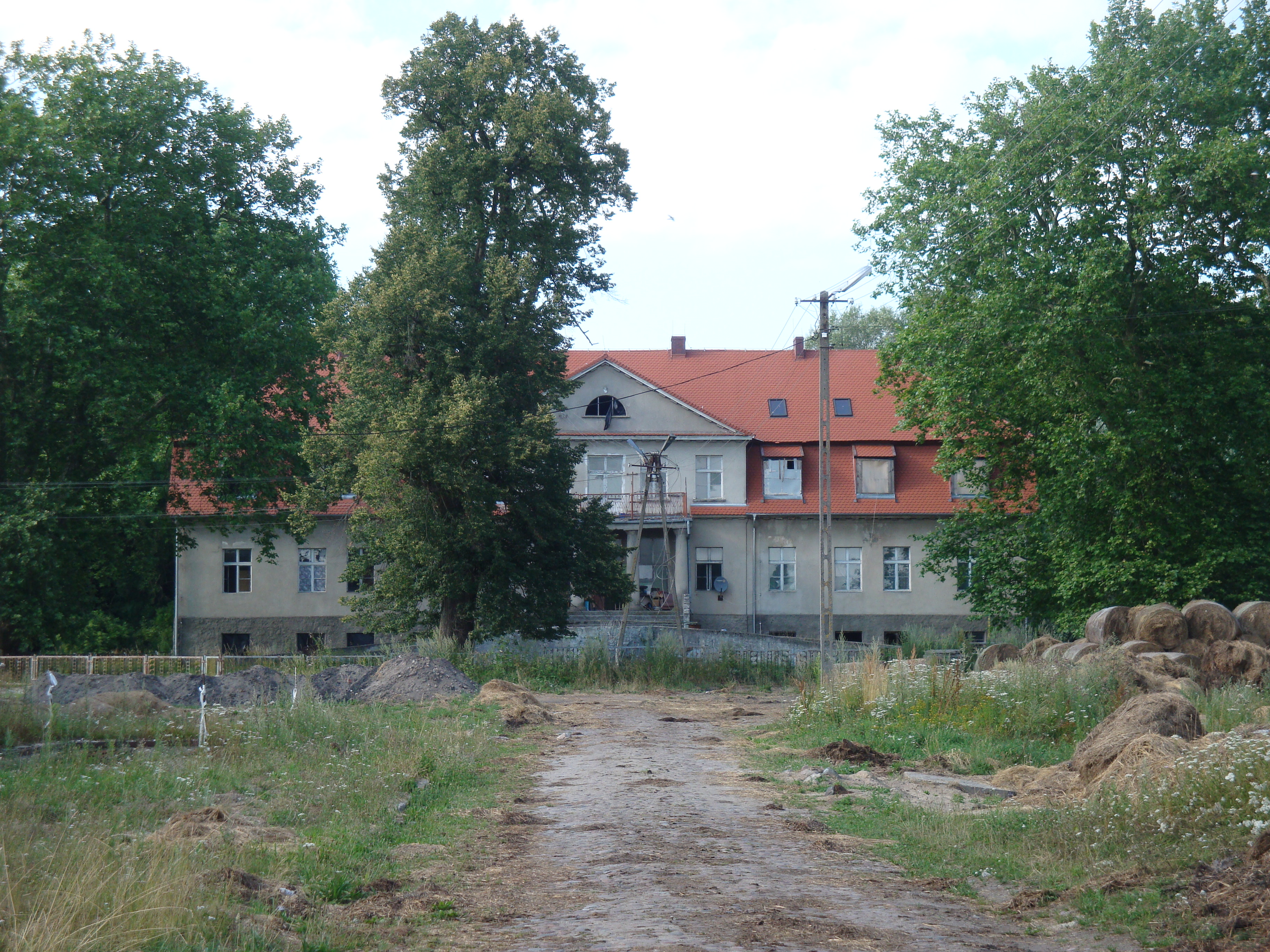
- Manor house in Skórzyno

- Location within Poland
- Coordinates: 54°38′6″N 17°21′33″E
- Country: Poland
- Voivodeship: Pomeranian
- County: Słupsk
- Gmina: Główczyce
- Population: 164

Skórzyno [skuˈʐɨnɔ] (German: Schorin) is a village in the administrative district of Gmina Główczyce, within Słupsk County, Pomeranian Voivodeship, in northern Poland.
