= Wolinia railway station =

Railway station in Wolinia, Poland

Wolinia

General information
- Location: Wolinia; Poland
- Coordinates: 54.613532°N 17.535869°E
- Owner: Polskie Koleje Państwowe S.A.
- Platforms: None

Construction
- Structure type: Building: No; Depot: No; Water tower: No

History
- Former names: Wollin
Location

Wolinia is a non-operational PKP railway station in Wolinia (Pomeranian Voivodeship), Poland.

== Lines crossing the station ==
Start station	End station	Line type
Słupsk	Cecenowo	Dismantled
