= Nowe Klęcinko =

Nowe Klęcinko (Klęcino Colony)
- Village
- Location within Poland
- Coordinates: 54°36′43″N 17°20′41″E
- Country: Poland
- Voivodeship: Pomeranian
- County: Słupsk
- Gmina: Główczyce

Nowe Klęcinko [ˈnɔvɛ klɛnˈt͡ɕinkɔ] is a village in the administrative district of Gmina Główczyce, within Słupsk County, Pomeranian Voivodeship, in northern Poland.

For the history of the region, see History of Pomerania.
