= Gmina Główczyce =

Gmina Główczyce Główczyce Commune
- Gmina
- Coat of arms
- Interactive map of Gmina Główczyce
- Coordinates (Główczyce): 54°37′9″N 17°22′14″E
- Country: Poland
- Voivodeship: Pomeranian
- County: Słupsk County
- Seat: Główczyce

Area
  - Total: 323.81 km^{2} (125.02 sq mi)

Population (2006)
  - Total: 9,394
  - Density: 29.01/km^{2} (75.14/sq mi)
- Website: http://www.glowczyce.dt.pl

Gmina Główczyce is a rural gmina (administrative district) in Słupsk County, Pomeranian Voivodeship, in northern Poland. Its seat is the village of Główczyce, which lies approximately 28 kilometres (17 mi) north-east of Słupsk and 87 km (54 mi) west of the regional capital Gdańsk.

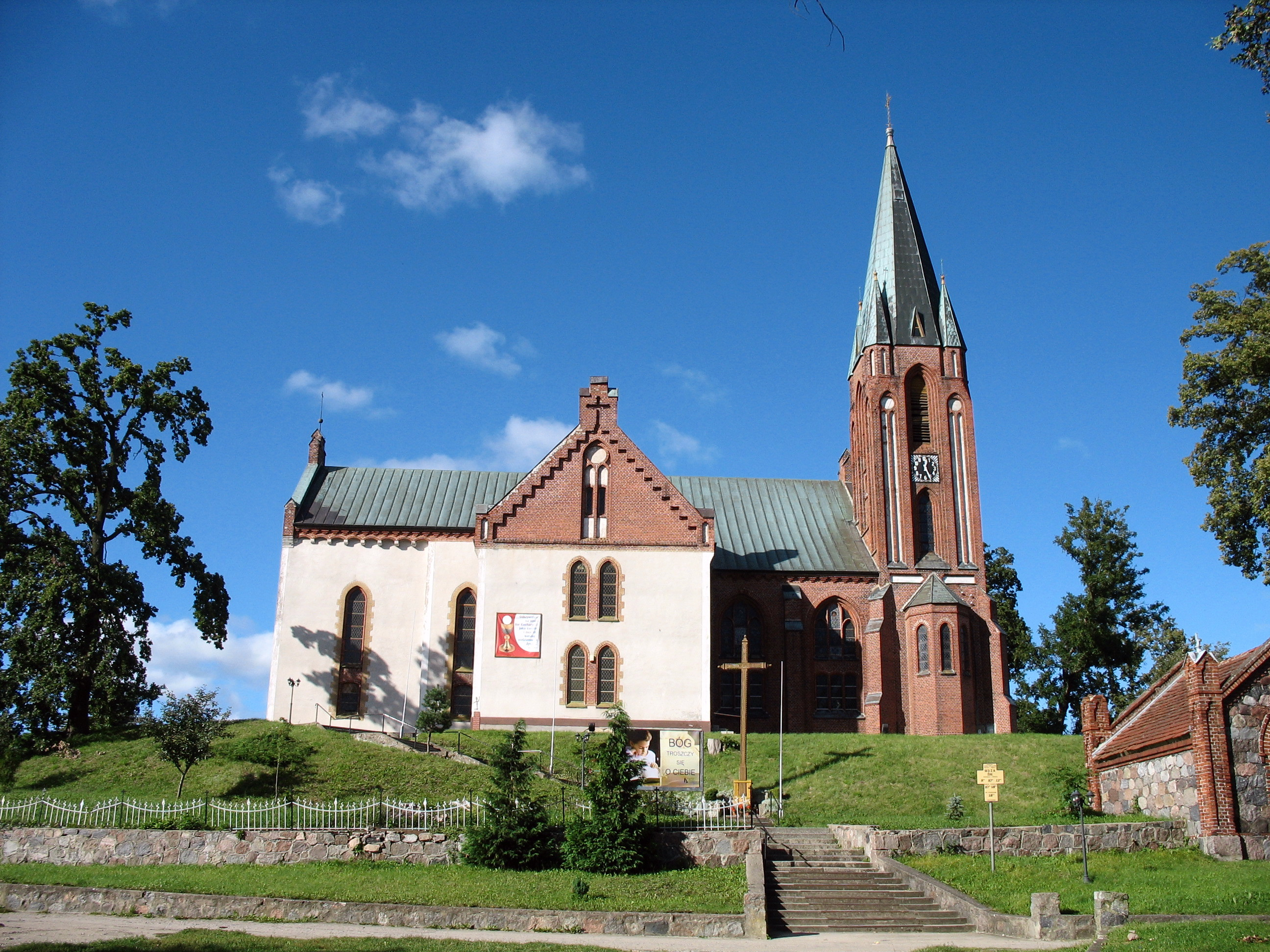

The gmina covers an area of 323.81 square kilometres (125.0 sq mi), and as of 2006 its total population is 9,394.

== Villages ==
Gmina Główczyce contains the villages and settlements of Ameryka, Będziechowo, Będzimierz, Borek Skórzyński, Budki, Bukowski Młyn, Cecenówko, Cecenowo, Choćmirówko, Choćmirowo, Ciemino, Czarny Młyn, Dargoleza, Dochówko, Dochowo, Drzeżewo, Gać, Gatka, Główczyce, Górzyno, Gorzysław, Gostkowo, Izbica, Karolin, Karpno, Klęcinko, Klęcino, Kokoszki, Lipno, Lisia Góra, Michałowo, Mokre, Murowaniec, Następowo, Nowe Klęcinko, Olszewko, Pękalin, Pobłocie, Podole Wielkie, Przebędowo Słupskie, Rówienko, Równo, Rumsko, Rzuski Las, Rzuszcze, Siodłonie, Skórzyno, Stowięcino, Święcino, Szczypkowice, Szelewo, Warblino, Wielka Wieś, Wolinia, Wykosowo, Zawada, Żelkowo, Zgierz, Zgojewko, Zgojewo and Żoruchowo.

== Neighbouring gminas ==
Gmina Główczyce is bordered by the gminas of Damnica, Nowa Wieś Lęborska, Potęgowo, Słupsk, Smołdzino and Wicko.
