= Czarny Młyn, Słupsk County =

Czarny Młyn
- Village
- Location within Poland
- Coordinates: 54°36′20″N 17°11′4″E
- Country: Poland
- Voivodeship: Pomeranian
- County: Słupsk
- Gmina: Główczyce
- Population: 2

Czarny Młyn [ˈt͡ʂarnɨ ˈmwɨn] is a village in the administrative district of Gmina Główczyce, within Słupsk County, Pomeranian Voivodeship, in northern Poland. Czarny Młyn is part of electoral district No. 6 of Gmina Główczyce, along with Żelkowo, Zgojewo, Zgojewko, Murowaniec, Choćmirówko, and Choćmirowo.

For the history of the region, see History of Pomerania.
