= Równo, Pomeranian Voivodeship =

Równo
- Village
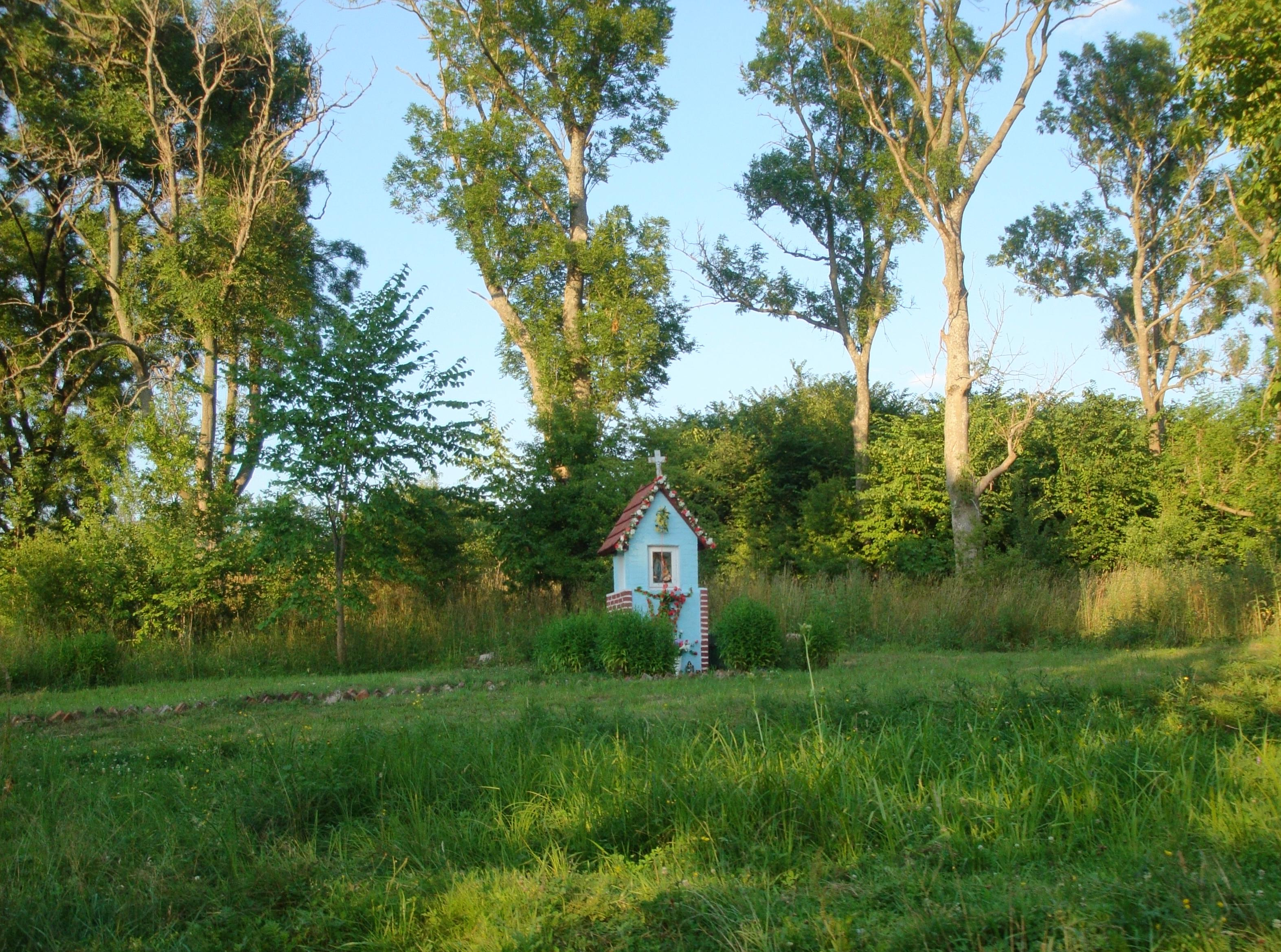
- Wayside shrine in Równo

- Location within Poland
- Coordinates: 54°37′11″N 17°19′28″E
- Country: Poland
- Voivodeship: Pomeranian
- County: Słupsk
- Gmina: Główczyce
- Time zone: UTC+1 (CET)
  - Summer (DST): UTC+2 (CEST)
- Vehicle registration: GSL

Równo [ˈruvnɔ] (German: Rowen) is a village in the administrative district of Gmina Główczyce, within Słupsk County, Pomeranian Voivodeship, in northern Poland. It is located in the historic region of Pomerania.

== History ==
The area became part of the emerging Polish state under its first historic ruler Mieszko I by c. 967. Following the fragmentation of Poland, at various times it formed part of the duchies of Eastern Pomerania, Western Pomerania and Słupsk. From the 18th century, it formed part of the Kingdom of Prussia, and from 1871 to 1945 it was also part of Germany. After Germany's defeat in World War II, it became again part of Poland.
