= Ameryka, Słupsk County =

Ameryka
- Village
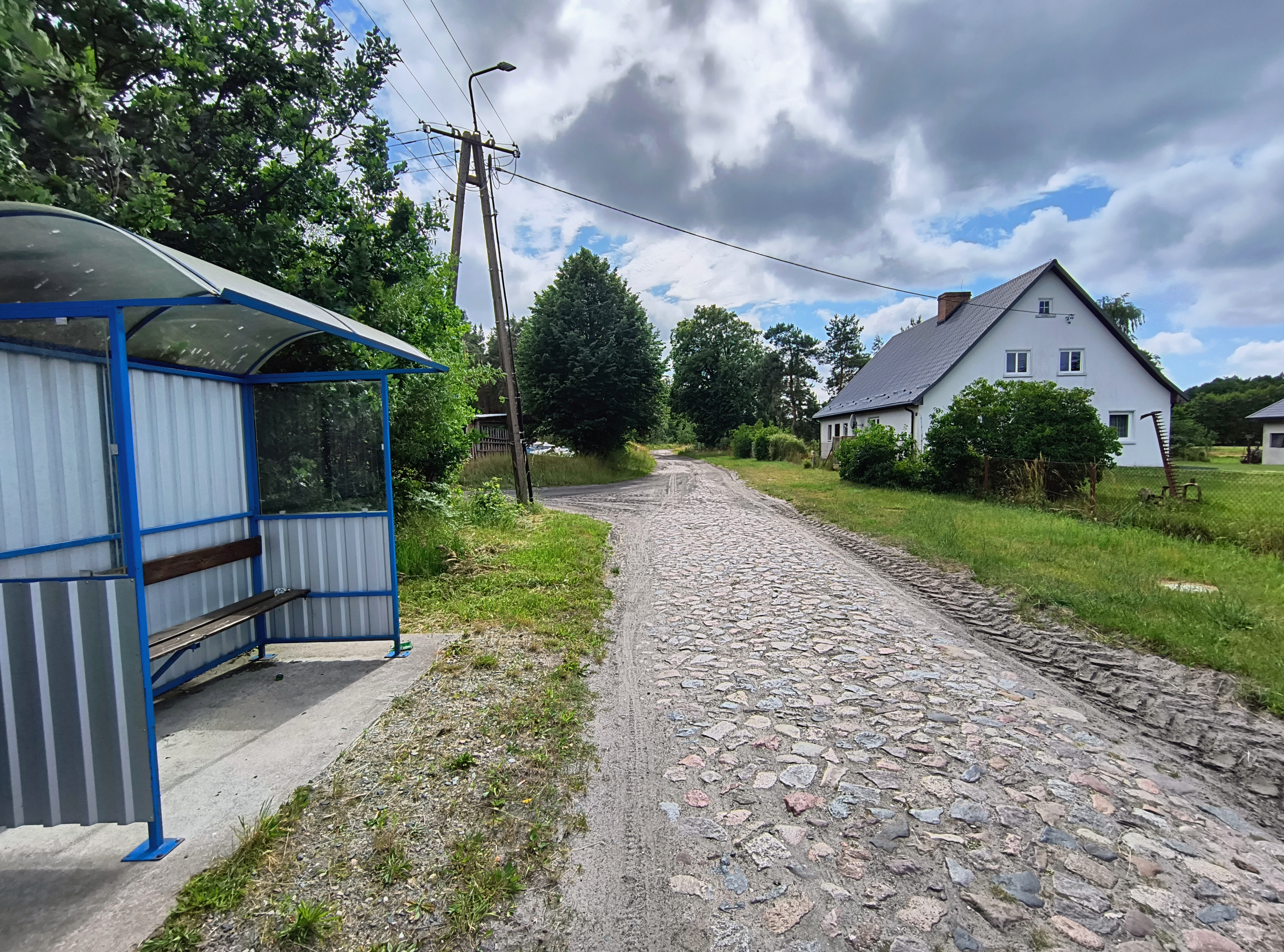
- Bus stop, farm building and road in the village

- Location within Poland
- Coordinates: 54°40′55″N 17°27′4″E
- Country: Poland
- Voivodeship: Pomeranian
- County: Słupsk
- Gmina: Główczyce
- Postal code: 76-220

Ameryka [amɛˈrɨka] (German: Amerika) is a village in the administrative district of Gmina Główczyce, within Słupsk County, Pomeranian Voivodeship, in northern Poland, close to the Baltic Sea coast.

== See also ==
- History of Pomerania
