= Karolin, Pomeranian Voivodeship =

Karolin
- Settlement
- Location within Poland
- Coordinates: 54°33′44″N 17°15′13″E
- Country: Poland
- Voivodeship: Pomeranian
- County: Słupsk
- Gmina: Główczyce
- Population: 30

Karolin [kaˈrɔlin] is a settlement in the administrative district of Gmina Główczyce, within Słupsk County, Pomeranian Voivodeship, in northern Poland.

For the history of the region, see History of Pomerania.
