= Olszewko, Słupsk County =

Olszewko
- Settlement
- Location within Poland
- Coordinates: 54°34′43″N 17°31′18″E
- Country: Poland
- Voivodeship: Pomeranian
- County: Słupsk
- Gmina: Główczyce
- Population: 7

Olszewko [ɔlˈʂɛfkɔ] is a settlement in the administrative district of Gmina Główczyce, within Słupsk County, Pomeranian Voivodeship, in northern Poland.

For the history of the region, see History of Pomerania.
