= Ciemino, Słupsk County =

Ciemino
- Village
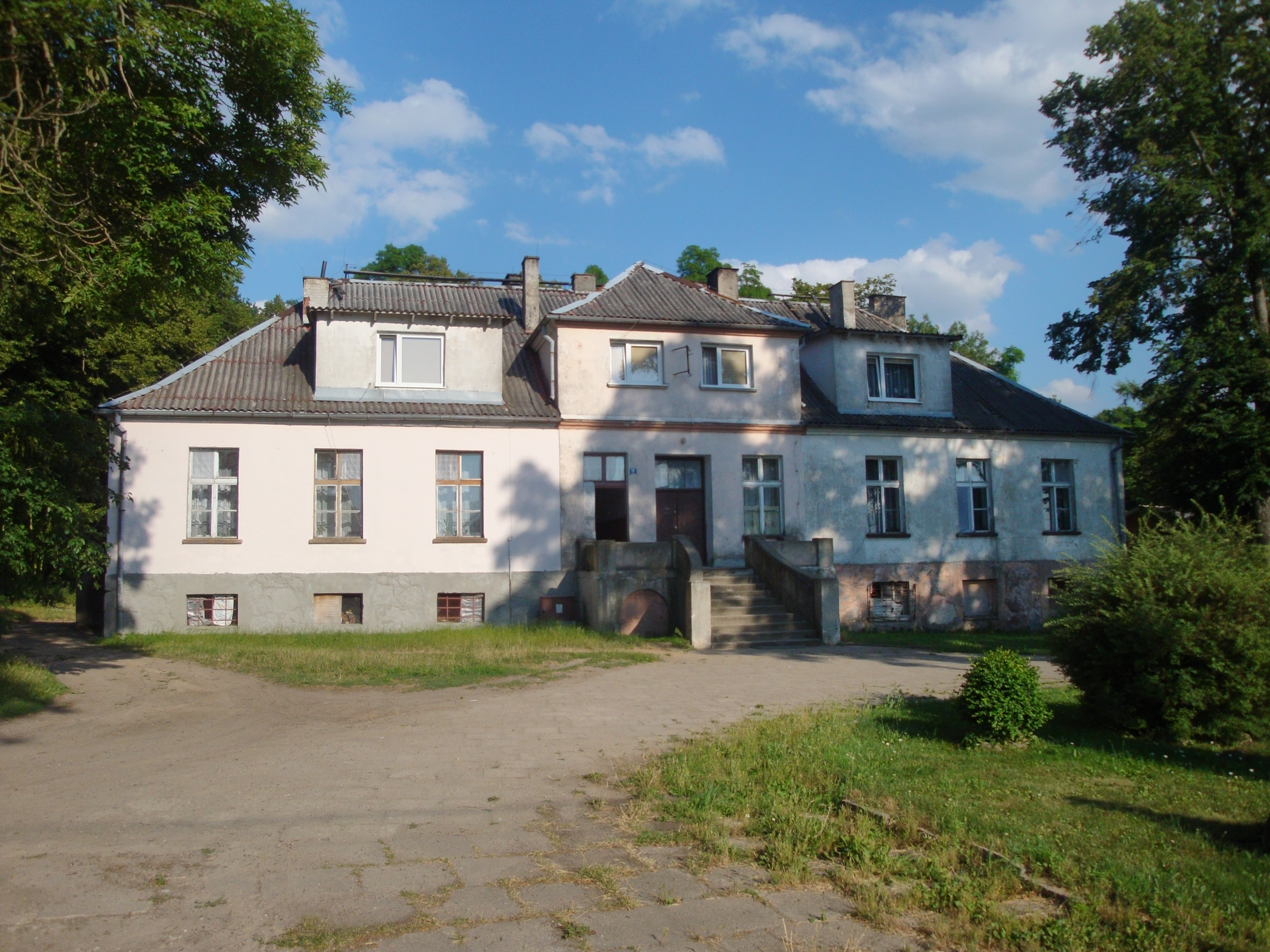
- Manor house in Ciemino

- Location within Poland
- Coordinates: 54°36′47″N 17°26′19″E
- Country: Poland
- Voivodeship: Pomeranian
- County: Słupsk
- Gmina: Główczyce

Population
  - Total: 206
- Postal code: 76-220
- Vehicle registration: GSL

Ciemino [t͡ɕɛˈminɔ] (German: Zemmin) is a village in the administrative district of Gmina Główczyce, within Słupsk County, Pomeranian Voivodeship, in northern Poland. It is located in the historic region of Pomerania.
