= Karpno, Słupsk County =

Karpno
- Settlement
- Location within Poland
- Coordinates: 54°34′12″N 17°30′43″E
- Country: Poland
- Voivodeship: Pomeranian
- County: Słupsk
- Gmina: Główczyce

Karpno [ˈkarpnɔ] is a settlement in the administrative district of Gmina Główczyce, within Słupsk County, Pomeranian Voivodeship, in northern Poland.

For the history of the region, see History of Pomerania.
