= Gać, Gmina Główczyce =

Village in Kashubia

Gać Szpék
- Village
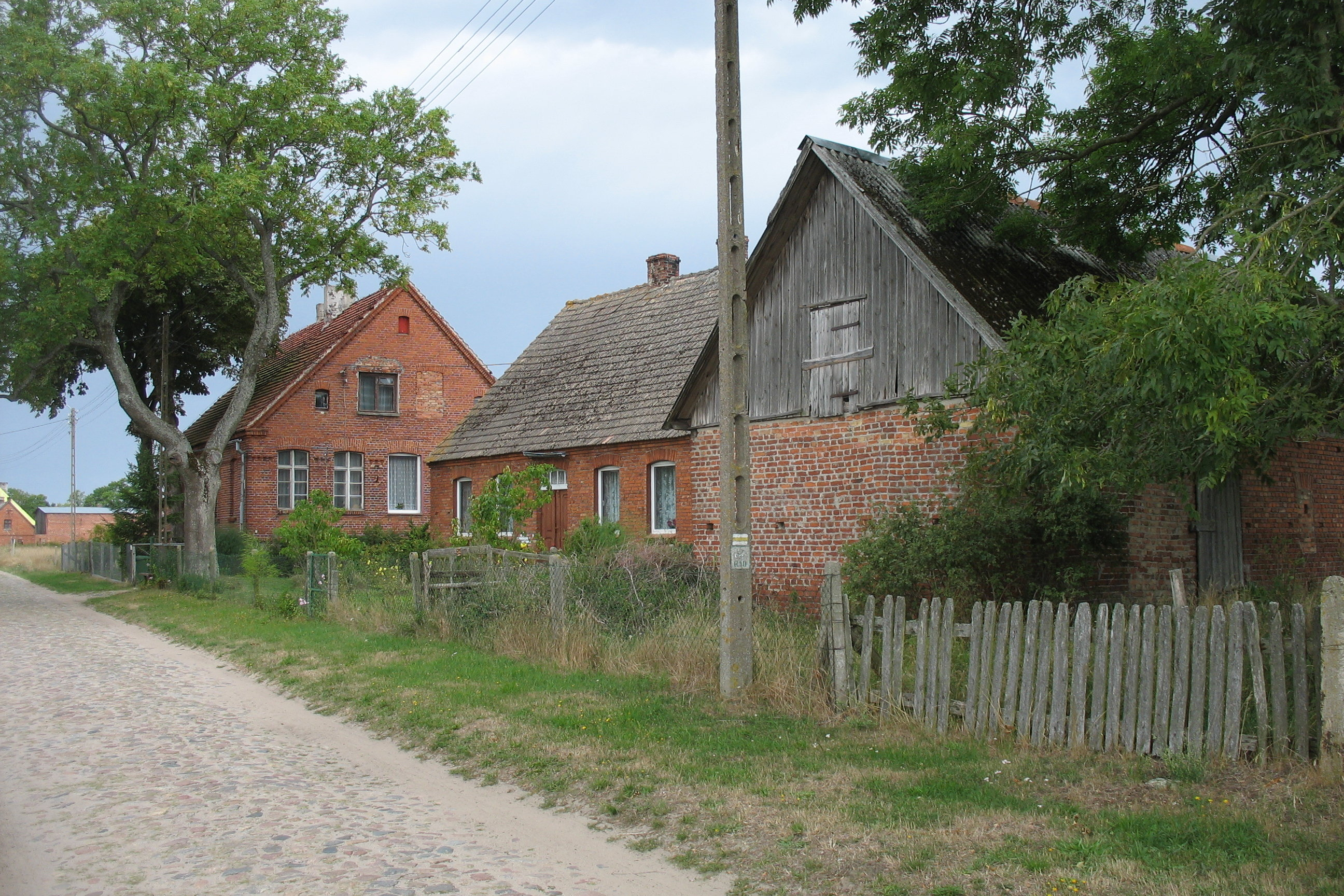

- Location within Poland
- Coordinates: 54°41′39″N 17°27′27″E
- Country: Poland
- Voivodeship: Pomeranian
- County: Słupsk
- Gmina: Główczyce

Population
  - Total: 50
- Time zone: UTC+1 (CET)
  - Summer (DST): UTC+2 (CEST)
- Postal code: 76-220
- Vehicle registration: GSL

Gać (Polish: [ɡat͡ɕ]; Kashubian: Szpék) is a village in the administrative district of Gmina Główczyce, within Słupsk County, Pomeranian Voivodeship, in northern Poland.
