= Izbica, Pomeranian Voivodeship =

Izbica
- Village
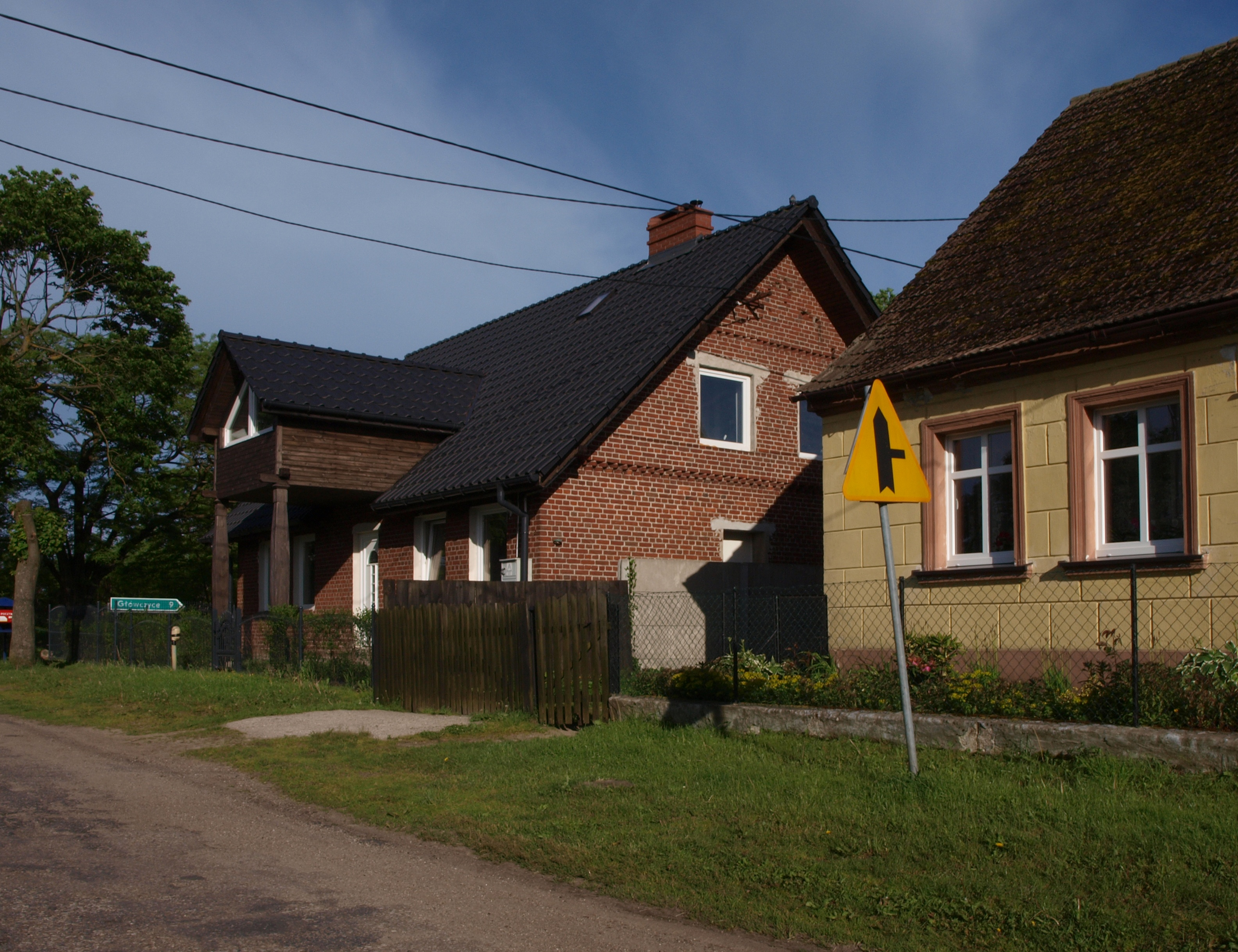

- Location within Poland
- Coordinates: 54°40′41″N 17°25′28″E
- Country: Poland
- Voivodeship: Pomeranian
- County: Słupsk
- Gmina: Główczyce
- Founded: 16th century

Population
  - Total: 299
- Time zone: UTC+1 (CET)
  - Summer (DST): UTC+2 (CEST)
- Vehicle registration: GSL

Izbica [izˈbit͡sa] (German: Giesebitz) is a village in the administrative district of Gmina Główczyce, within Słupsk County, Pomeranian Voivodeship, in northern Poland.

== Etymology ==
The name of the village comes from the Polish word izbica.
