= Borek Skórzyński =

- Settlement
- Location within Poland
- Coordinates: 54°38′28″N 17°22′27″E
- Country: Poland
- Voivodeship: Pomeranian
- County: Słupsk
- Gmina: Główczyce

Borek Skórzyński [ˈbɔrɛk skuˈʐɨɲski] (German: Bork) is a settlement in the administrative district of Gmina Główczyce, within Słupsk County, Pomeranian Voivodeship, in northern Poland.

== See also ==
- History of Pomerania
