= Choćmirowo =

- Village
- Location within Poland
- Coordinates: 54°36′1″N 17°14′18″E
- Country: Poland
- Voivodeship: Pomeranian
- County: Słupsk
- Gmina: Główczyce

Population
  - Total: 41
- Postal code: 76-220
- Vehicle registration: GSL

Choćmirowo [xɔt͡ɕmiˈrɔvɔ] (German: Alt Gutzmerow) is a village in the administrative district of Gmina Główczyce, within Słupsk County, Pomeranian Voivodeship, in northern Poland. It is located in the historic region of Pomerania.
