= Struga, Szczecin =

Neighbourhood of Szczecin, Poland

Struga
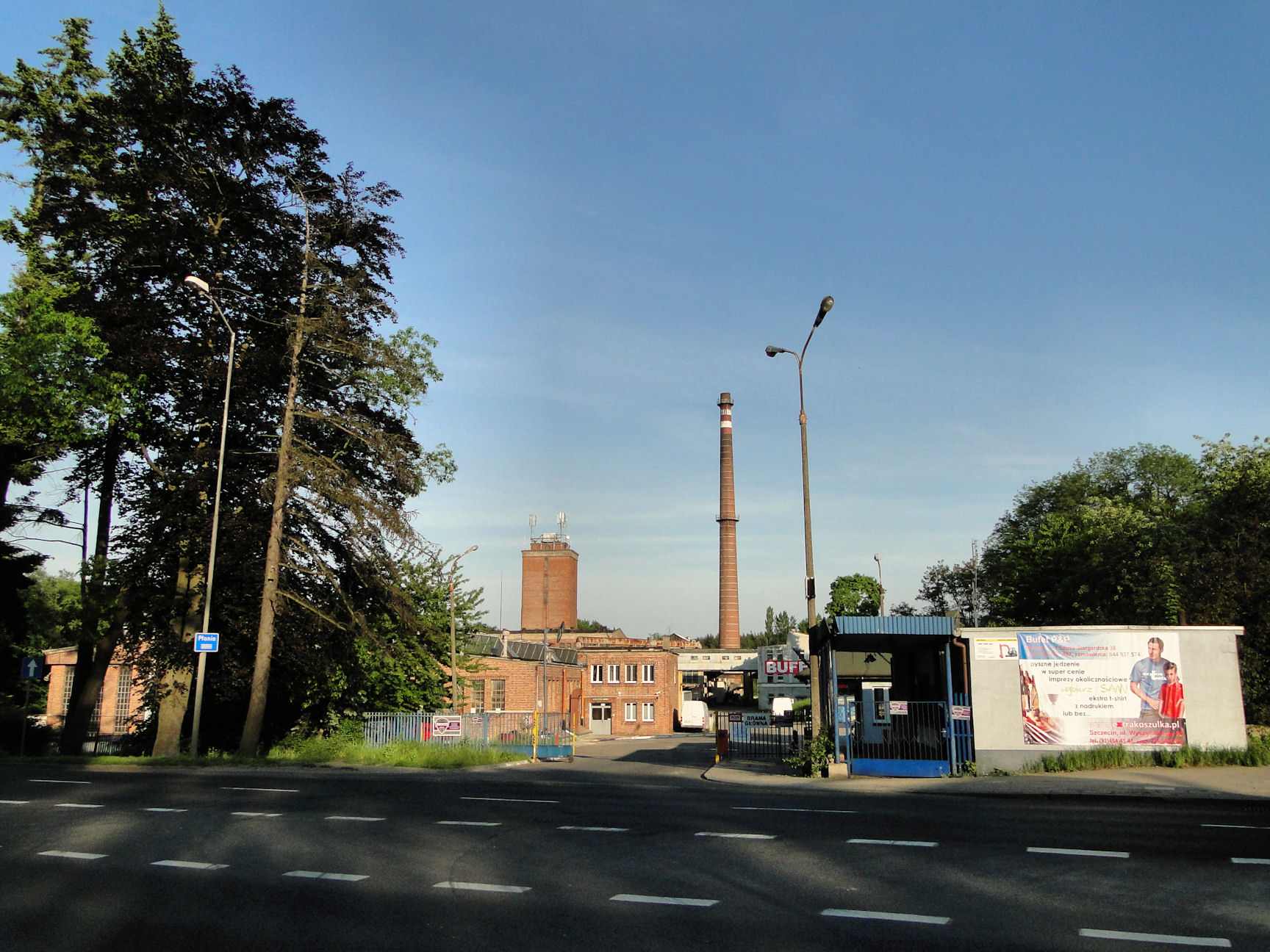
- Country: Poland
- Voivodeship: West Pomeranian
- County/City: Szczecin
- Time zone: UTC+1 (CET)
  - Summer (DST): UTC+2 (CEST)
- Vehicle registration: ZS

Struga (German: Buchholz, Hohenkrug, Königsweg and Henningsholm) is a part of the city of Szczecin, Poland situated on the right bank of Oder river, east of the Szczecin Old Town, and south-east of Szczecin-Dąbie.

== History ==
The area became part of the emerging Polish state under its first ruler Mieszko I around 967, and following Poland's fragmentation it formed part of the Duchy of Pomerania. Hohenkrug was the first village in the Duchy of Pomerania clearly recorded as German-settled (villa teutonicorum) in 1173, at the beginning of the medieval German settlement of Pomerania (Ostsiedlung).
