= Szczypkowice =

- Village
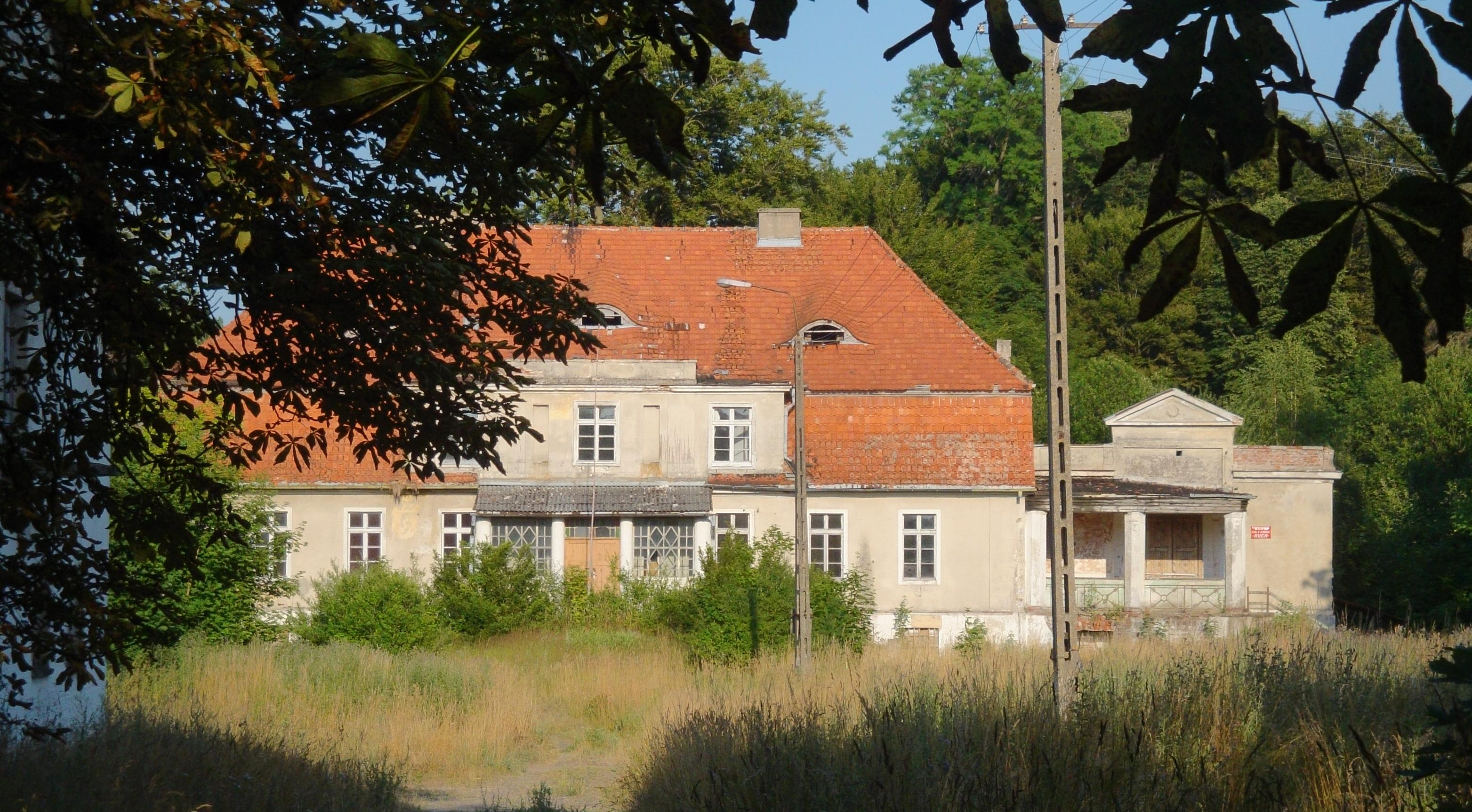
- Manor house in Szczypkowice

- Location within Poland
- Coordinates: 54°34′35″N 17°24′59″E
- Country: Poland
- Voivodeship: Pomeranian
- County: Słupsk
- Gmina: Główczyce
- Population: 492

Szczypkowice [ʂt͡ʂɨpkɔˈvit͡sɛ] (German: Zipkow) is a village in the administrative district of Gmina Główczyce, within Słupsk County, Pomeranian Voivodeship, in northern Poland.

For the history of the region, see History of Pomerania.
