= Dargoleza =

- Village
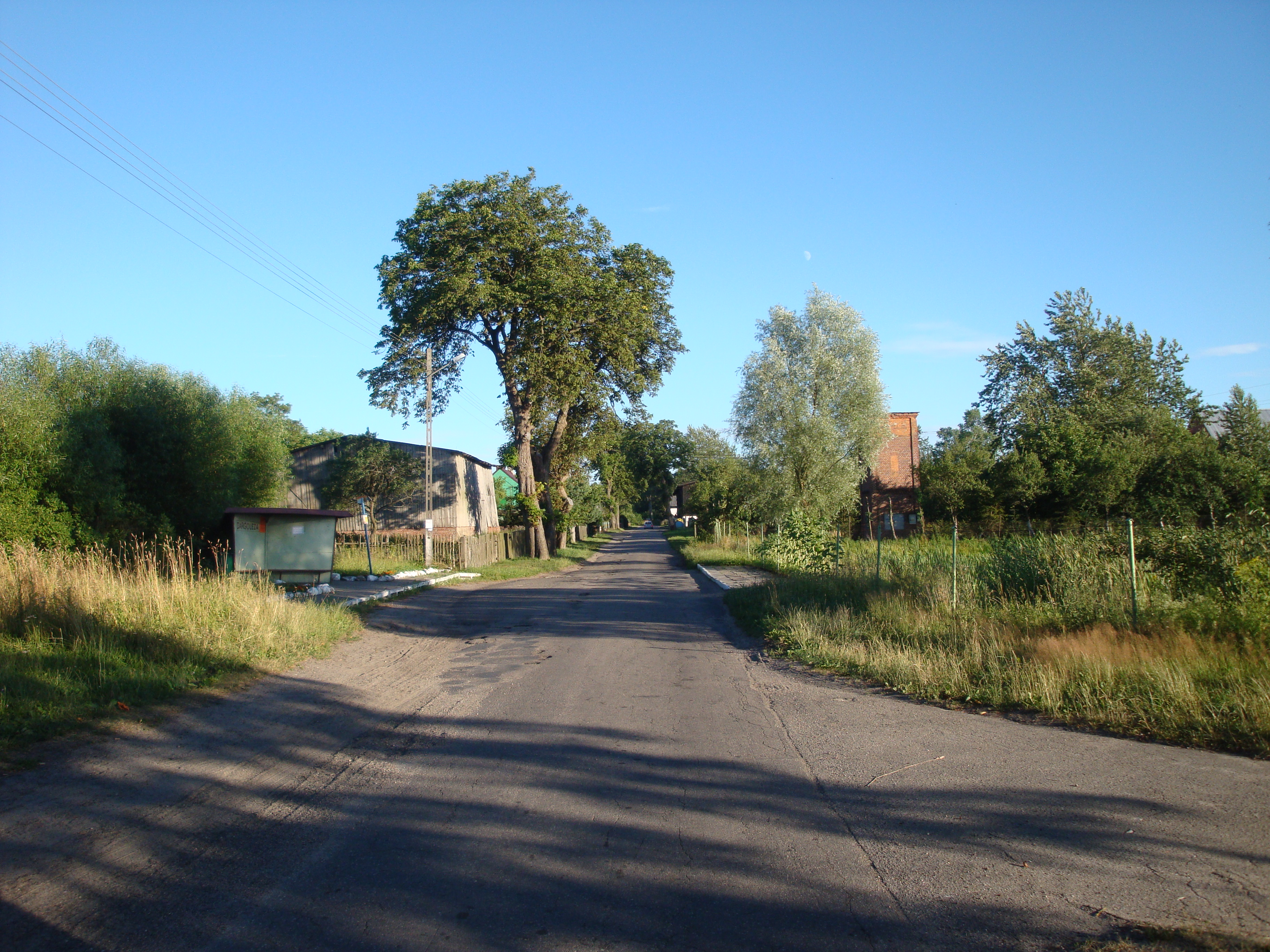
- Bus stop in village

- Location within Poland
- Coordinates: 54°36′9″N 17°30′16″E
- Country: Poland
- Voivodeship: Pomeranian
- County: Słupsk
- Gmina: Główczyce
- Population: 180

Dargoleza [darɡɔˈlɛza] (German: Dargeröse) is a village in the administrative district of Gmina Główczyce, within Słupsk County, Pomeranian Voivodeship, in northern Poland.

Before 1648 the area was part of Duchy of Pomerania, 1648-1945 Prussia and Germany. For the history of the region, see History of Pomerania.
