= Warblino =

- Village
- Location within Poland
- Coordinates: 54°35′14″N 17°23′57″E
- Country: Poland
- Voivodeship: Pomeranian
- County: Słupsk
- Gmina: Główczyce
- Population: 174

Warblino [varˈblinɔ] (German: Warbelin) is a village in the administrative district of Gmina Główczyce, within Słupsk County, Pomeranian Voivodeship, in northern Poland.

For the history of the region, see History of Pomerania.
