= Żoruchowo =

- Village
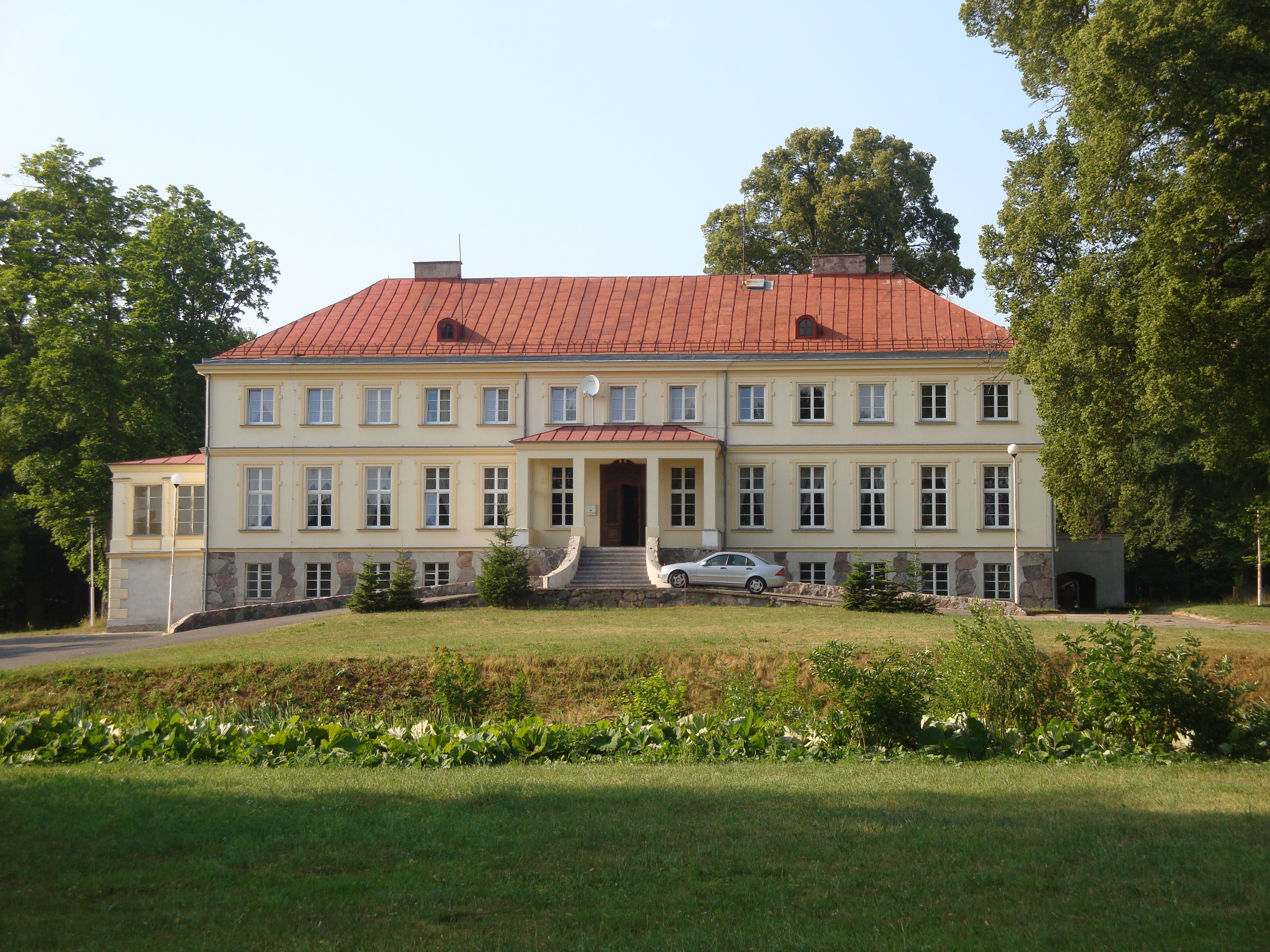
- Palace in Żoruchowo

- Location within Poland
- Coordinates: 54°34′12″N 17°11′28″E
- Country: Poland
- Voivodeship: Pomeranian
- County: Słupsk
- Gmina: Główczyce
- Population: 574

Żoruchowo [ʐɔruˈxɔvɔ] (German: Sorchow) is a village in the administrative district of Gmina Główczyce, within Słupsk County, Pomeranian Voivodeship, in northern Poland.

For the history of the region, see History of Pomerania.
