= Główczyce, Pomeranian Voivodeship =

Główczyce
- Village
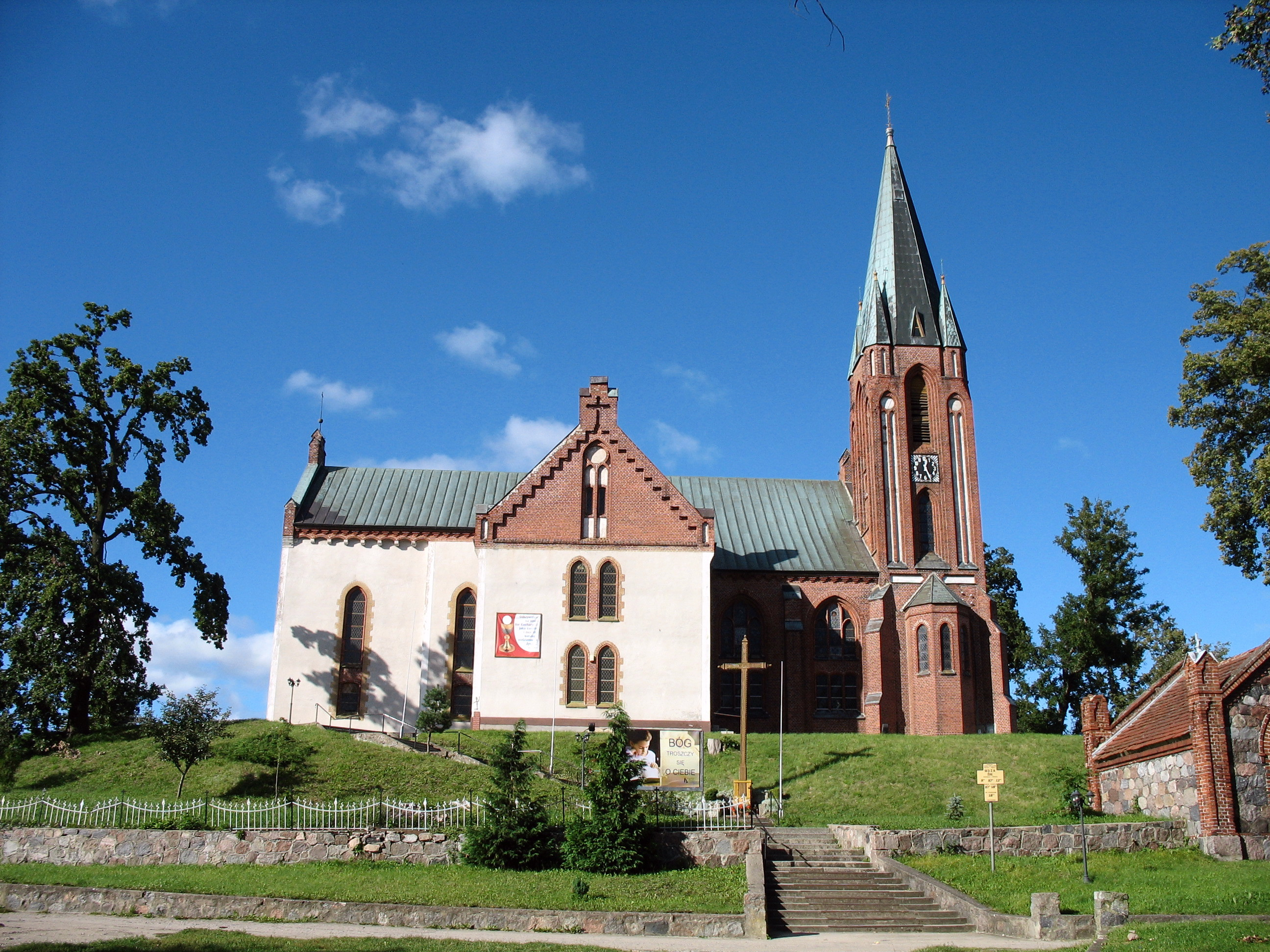
- Church of Saints Peter and Paul

- Location within Poland
- Coordinates: 54°37′9″N 17°22′14″E
- Country: Poland
- Voivodeship: Pomeranian
- County: Słupsk
- Gmina: Główczyce

Population
  - Total: 2,048
- Website: http://www.glowczyce.dt.pl/

Główczyce [ɡwufˈt͡ʂɨt͡sɛ] (German: Glowitz) is a village in Słupsk County, Pomeranian Voivodeship, in northern Poland. It is the seat of the gmina (administrative district) called Gmina Główczyce.

== History ==
The prefix in the name of Główczyce indicates the origin of the name from the proper name of Główka (meaning head in polish). The village of Główczyce was once an important cultural center of Kashubia. Główczyce was already mentioned in 1252. In 1475, Nikolaus von Puttkamer becomes the owner of the village and nearby lands, from the second half of the 15th century until the end of 1945, the property of Główczyce was in the hands of the von Puttkamer (Podkomorzy in polish, von Puttkamer were Germanized Pomeranian slavs) noble family along with the widely known noble manor in the middle of the village. Główczyce remained with the Puttkamer family until 1945. In 1784 in the village there was one farm, one water mill, three wells, one forge and two woodcutter's apartments - thirty-eight estates in total. The progressive and intensively propagated by the Prussian administration Germanization of the local Kashubians led to complete denationalization and the loss of a separate identity (the abolition of Kashubian as the language of instruction in the local school in 1842). The last Kashubian sermon was held here in 1886. Until 1945, Główczyce was located on the Słupsk-Dargoleza railway line (dismantled by the Red Army). In the times of the People's Republic of Poland, a carbonated water plant, a gravel pit, grain plants and a "PGR" (polish state farm structure) meadow combine were established. There was a rural department store, a cinema, a health center and a community center. 24 March 2021 the noble manor burned down.

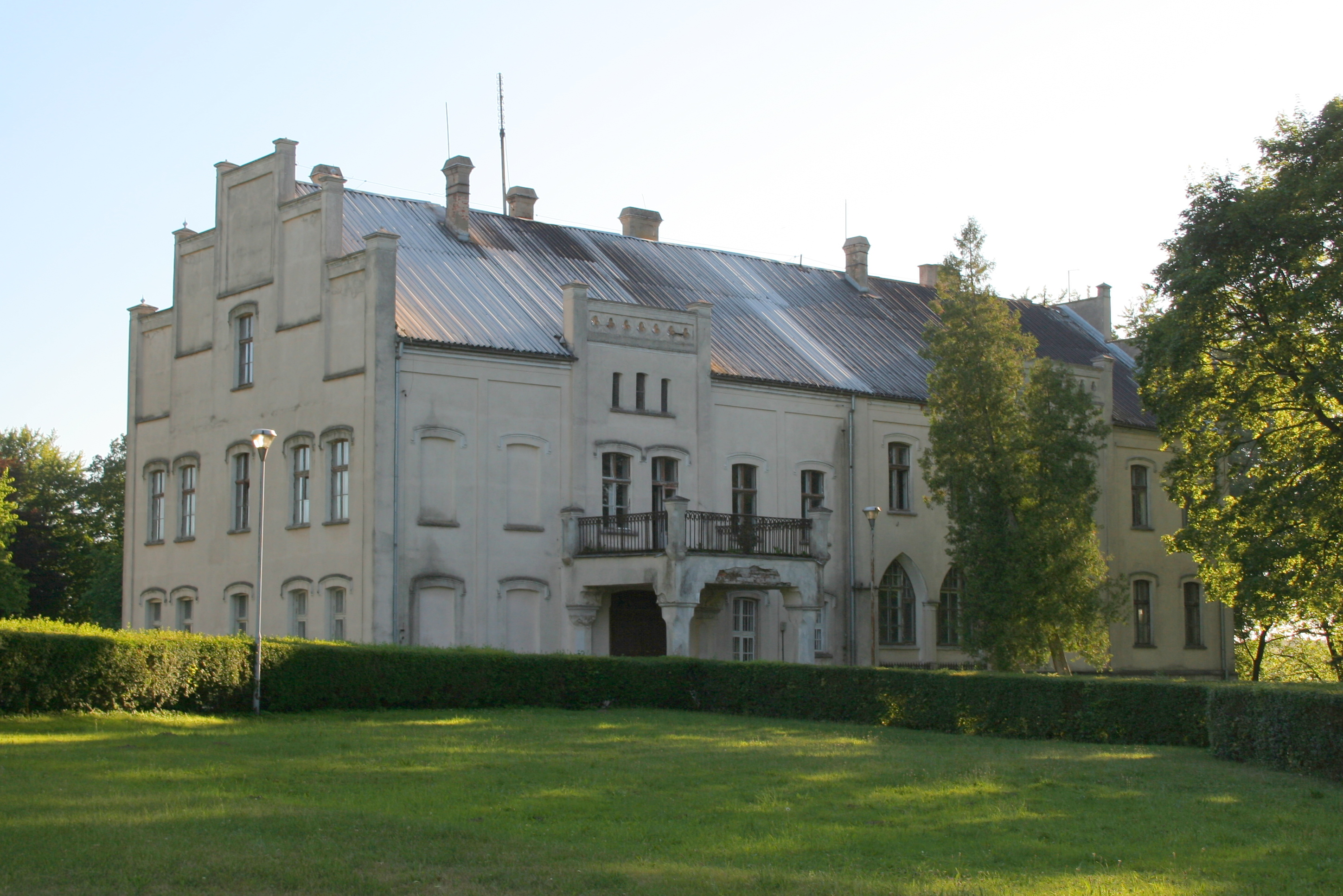
Podkomorzy family manor before burning down

== Geography ==
Główczyce is located in Eastern Pomerania, on a plateau south of Łebsko Lake in the north-eastern part of the Słupsk Powiat. Główczyce is the seat of Gmina Główczyce and seat of Sołectwo Główczyce, respectively major and minor polish administrative units. Główczyce is situated on the Pustynka river.

== Notable residents ==
- Ulli Beier (1922-2011), author
