= Będziechowo =

- Village
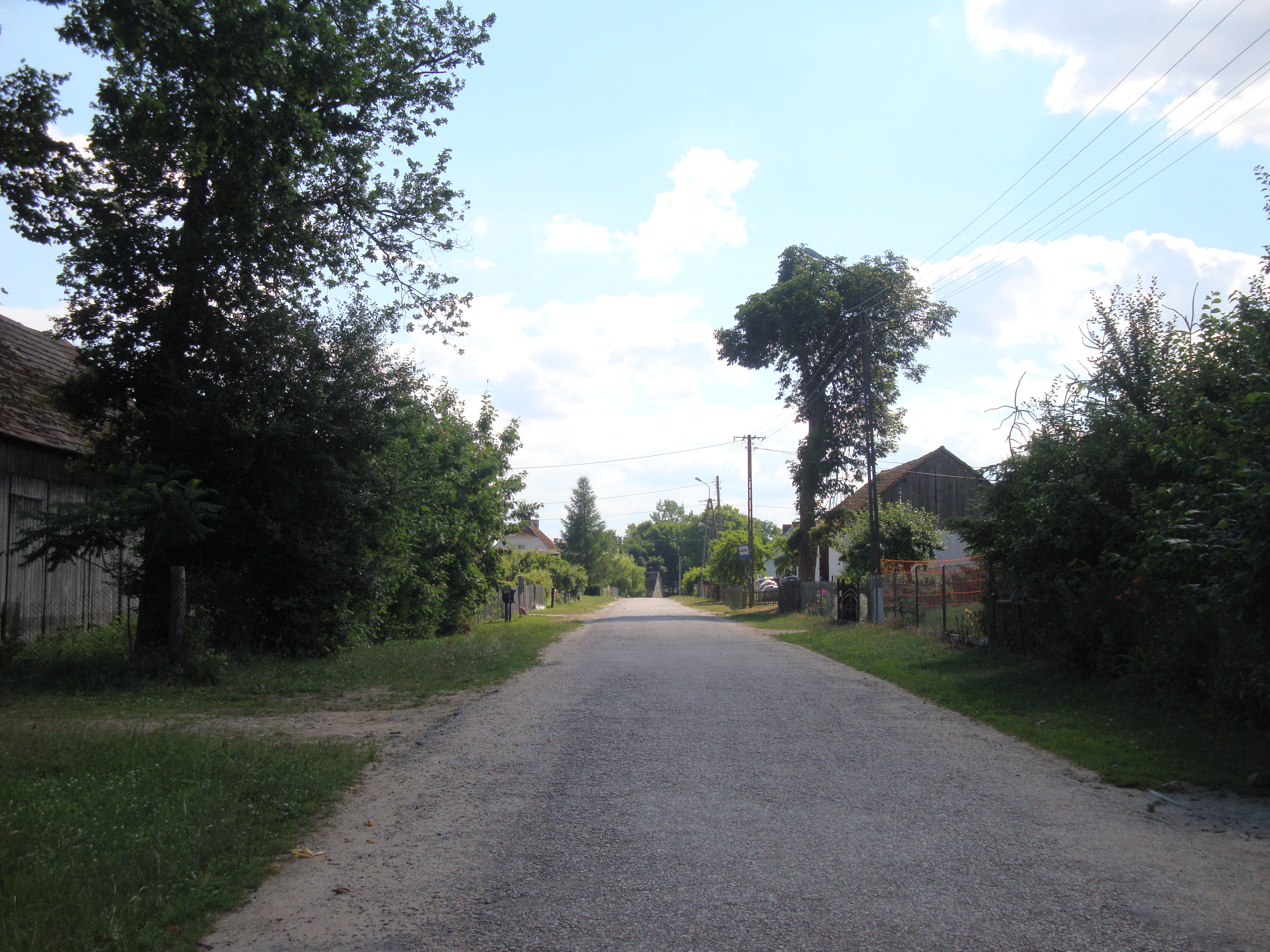

- Location within Poland
- Coordinates: 54°35′16″N 17°17′21″E
- Country: Poland
- Voivodeship: Pomeranian
- County: Słupsk
- Gmina: Główczyce
- Population: 141

Będziechowo [bɛnd͡ʑɛˈxɔvɔ] (German: Bandsechow) is a village in the administrative district of Gmina Główczyce, within Słupsk County, Pomeranian Voivodeship, in northern Poland.
