= Klęcino =

- village
- Location within Poland
- Coordinates: 54°36′1″N 17°21′1″E
- Country: Poland
- Voivodeship: Pomeranian
- County: Słupsk
- Gmina: Główczyce
- Population: 250

Klęcino [klɛnˈt͡ɕinɔ] (German: Klenzin) is a village in the administrative district of Gmina Główczyce, within Słupsk County, Pomeranian Voivodeship, in northern Poland.

For the history of the region, see History of Pomerania.
