= Kępno Słupskie railway station =

Railway station in Pomeranian Voivodeship, Poland

Kępno Słupskie

General information
- Location: Kępno; Pomeranian Voivodeship; Poland
- Owner: Stolper Kreisbahn (1897-1930); Stolper Kreisbahnen AG (1930-1940); Pommersche Landesbahnen (1940-1945); PKP (1945)
- Lines: Kępno Słupskie–Ustka; Słupsk–Cecenowo

Construction
- Structure type: Building: No; Depot: No; Water tower: Yes

History
- Opened: 1897
- Closed: 1945
- Former names: Gabel
Location

Kępno Słupskie is a former railway station in Kępno (Pomeranian Voivodeship), Poland.

== Location ==
The station was situated north of the village of Kępno.

== History ==
Opened in 1897 as Gabel, the station was part of a narrow-gauge (750 mm) railway network known as Stolper Bahnen in German.

In 1913, the railway section from Gabel to Ustka (German: Stolpmünde) would be completed. Between 1920 and 1922 the track gauge of the railway line to Cecenowo would be upgraded to standard gauge in the section between Stolp (Polish: Słupsk) and Klenzin (Klęcino).

In the final stages of the Second World War, in 1945, all railway lines east of the river Oder would become part of the PKP network and consequently be reconstructed. The train station of Gabel is renamed to the polish name Kępno Słupskie.

Despite the reconstruction of the polish railway network, the Stolper Bahnen, as well as for other minor railways in the Pomerania region, would not be reinstated and be dismantled, as ordered by the Red Army.

== Lines crossing the station ==
Start station	End station	Line type
Słupsk	Cecenowo	Dismantled
Kępno	Komnino	Dismantled
