= Gustav von Below =

Gustav Ernst Anton Wilhelm Ewald von Below (18 July 1790 – 19 November 1843) was the son of Livonian born Prussian hauptmann Karl Gustav von Below (1759–1840) and Charlotte Wilhelmine von Woedtke (1757–1798), one of three brothers and two sisters. The family owned several estates in Pomerania, including Gatz, where Gustav was born, and Reddentin where he died. Like most male members of his family and class, he joined the Prussian Army. However, led by figures such as Ernst von Senfft-Pilsach, many of the military aristocracy from Pomerania reacted against the luxuriousness of court life in Berlin after the Napoleonic Wars and became deeply religious, under the influence of Pietism, which was especially strong in this part of the Kingdom of Prussia.

In 1817 Gustav began to have intense, charismatic religious experiences, including glossolalia (speaking in tongues). His brothers Karl and Heinrich began to have similar experiences, and they jointly devoted their estate at Reddentin to charismatic prayer meetings, open to noble and commoner alike. The movement spread over Pomerania and, via immigration, to the United States, where it developed into what is now the Pentecostal movement.

Many Prussian officials of high importance were drawn to these meetings at Reddentin or elsewhere, including the young Otto von Bismarck, and the von Gerlach brothers, one of whom was the king's closest friend. The Evangelical Church in Prussia was somewhat suspicious of these phenomena, and the charismatics were temporarily separated from the main church until an Evangelical investigatory commission found them to be "of God." The religious atmosphere may also have influenced other military figures such as Gustav's nephew, Field-Marshal Leonhard Graf von Blumenthal who grew up in the Below household.
