= Karzcino railway station =

Railway station in Poland

Karzcino

General information
- Location: Karzcino; Poland
- Coordinates: 54.552145°N 17.059961°E
- Owner: Polskie Koleje Państwowe S.A.
- Platforms: None

Construction
- Structure type: Building: No; Depot: No; Water tower: No

History
- Former names: Karzin
Location

Karzcino is a non-operational PKP railway station in Karzcino (Pomeranian Voivodeship), Poland.

== Lines crossing the station ==
Start station	End station	Line type
Słupsk	Cecenowo	Dismantled
