= Siemianice railway station =

Railway station in Pomeranian Voivodeship, Poland

Coordinates: 54.4978°N 17.0539°E

Siemianice

General information
- Location: Siemianice; Poland
- Owner: Polskie Koleje Państwowe S.A.
- Platforms: None

Construction
- Structure type: Building: No; Depot: No; Water tower: No

History
- Former names: Schmaaty
Location

Siemianice is a non-operational PKP railway station in Siemianice (Pomeranian Voivodeship), Poland.

== Lines crossing the station ==
| Start station | End station | Line type |
|---|---|---|
| Słupsk | Cecenowo | Dismantled |
