= Łękwica railway station =

Railway station in Łękwica, Poland

Łękwica

General information
- Location: Łękwica; Poland
- Coordinates: 54.586418°N 17.141085°E
- Owner: Polskie Koleje Państwowe S.A.
- Platforms: None

Construction
- Structure type: Building: No; Depot: No; Water tower: No

History
- Former names: Lankwitz (Kr. Stolp)
Location

Łękwica is a non-operational PKP railway station in Łękwica (Pomeranian Voivodeship), Poland.

== Lines crossing the station ==
Start station	End station	Line type
Słupsk	Cecenowo	Dismantled
