= Kukowo, Pomeranian Voivodeship =

Kukowo
- Village
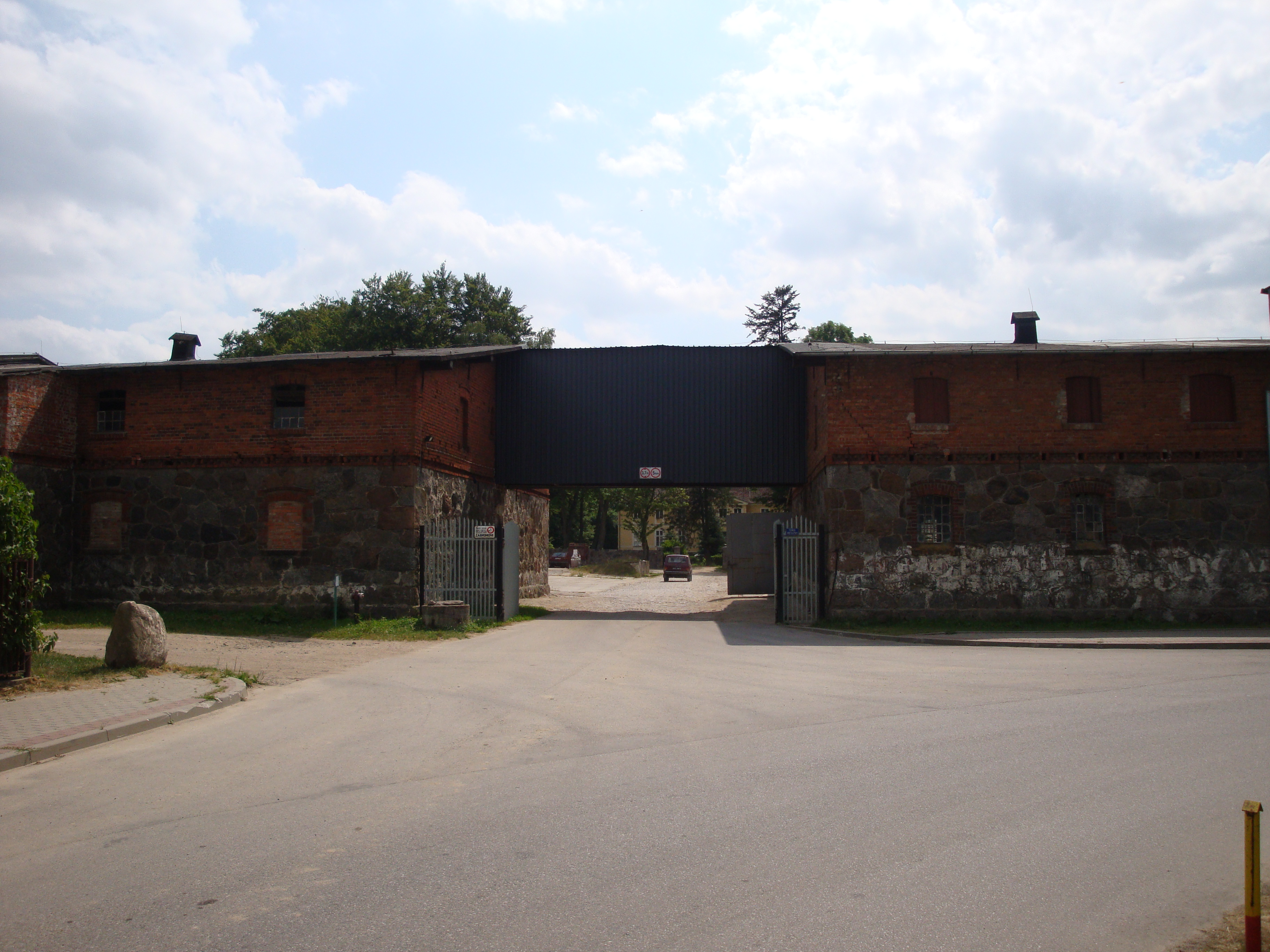
- Gate to folwark's remains

- Location within Poland
- Coordinates: 54°32′24″N 17°10′15″E
- Country: Poland
- Voivodeship: Pomeranian
- County: Słupsk
- Gmina: Słupsk
- Population: 212

Kukowo [kuˈkɔvɔ] is a village in the administrative district of Gmina Słupsk, within Słupsk County, Pomeranian Voivodeship, in northern Poland.

The name is derived from the personal name Kuk.

It was an estate belonging to the village of Rogawica.
