= Włynkowo railway station =

Railway station in Włynkowo, Poland

Włynkowo

General information
- Location: Włynkowo, Pomeranian Voivodeship; Poland
- Coordinates: 54°29′57″N 16°59′56″E
- Owner: Dworzec Polski S.A.
Location

Włynkowo railway station is a railway station located in Włynkowo, Pomeranian Voivodeship.
