= Strzelinko =

- Village
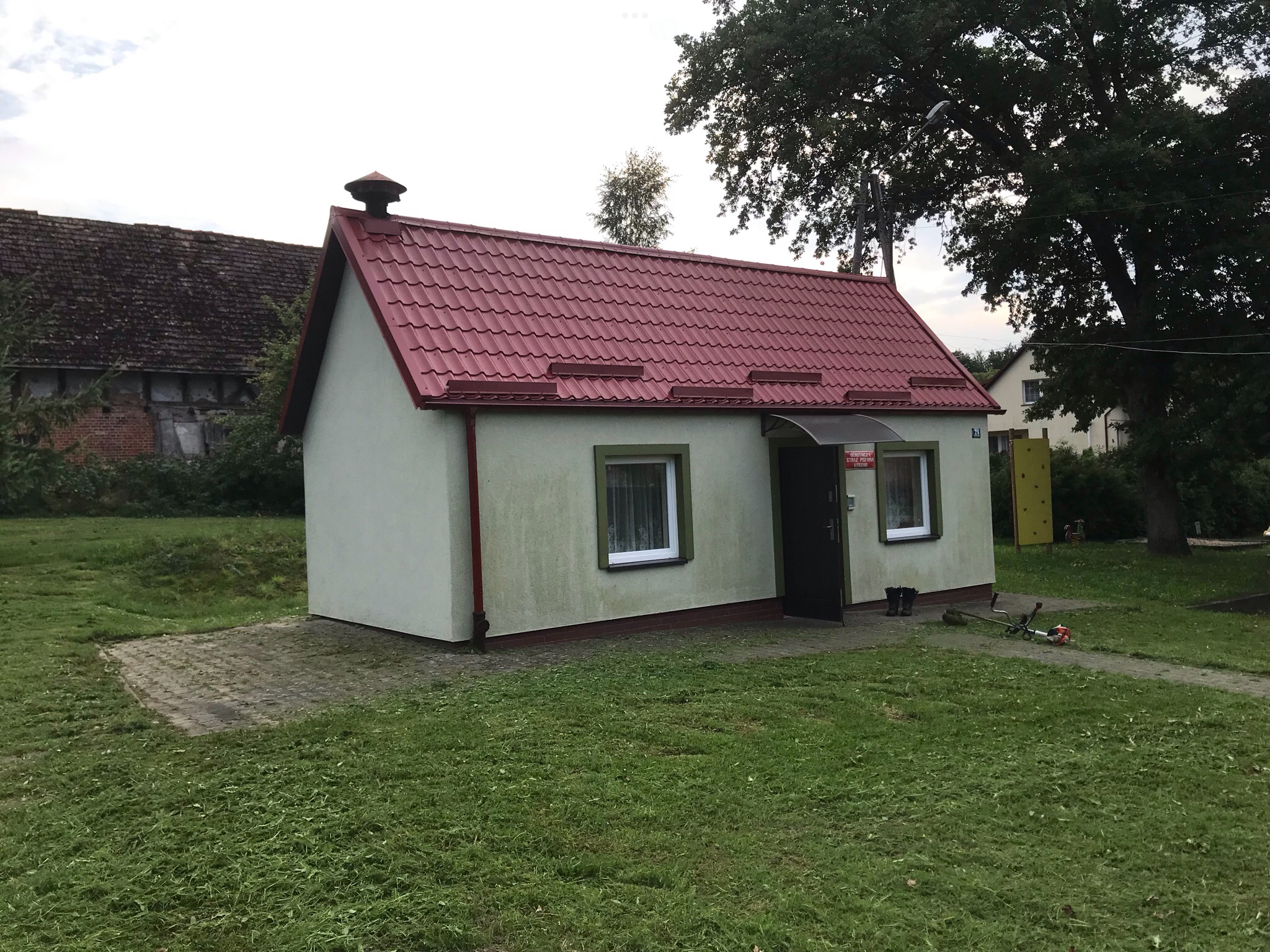

- Location within Poland
- Coordinates: 54°31′N 16°57′E
- Country: Poland
- Voivodeship: Pomeranian
- County: Słupsk
- Gmina: Słupsk

Population
  - Total: 180
- Time zone: UTC+1 (CET)
  - Summer (DST): UTC+2 (CEST)
- Postal code: 76-200

Strzelinko [stʂɛˈlinkɔ] (German: Klein Strellin) is a village in the administrative district of Gmina Słupsk, within Słupsk County, Pomeranian Voivodeship, in northern Poland.

== Etymology ==
Strzelinko is a diminutive form of the name of the nearby village of Strzelino, itself of Slavic origin.
