= Eugen Ferdinand von Homeyer =

German ornithologist (1809–1889)

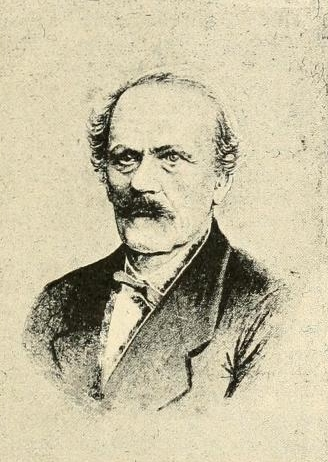

Eugen Ferdinand von Homeyer (11 November 1809 – 31 May 1889) was a German ornithologist. He made early studies of the birds of Pomerania, making collections, and was a staunch anti-Darwinian.

== Life and work ==
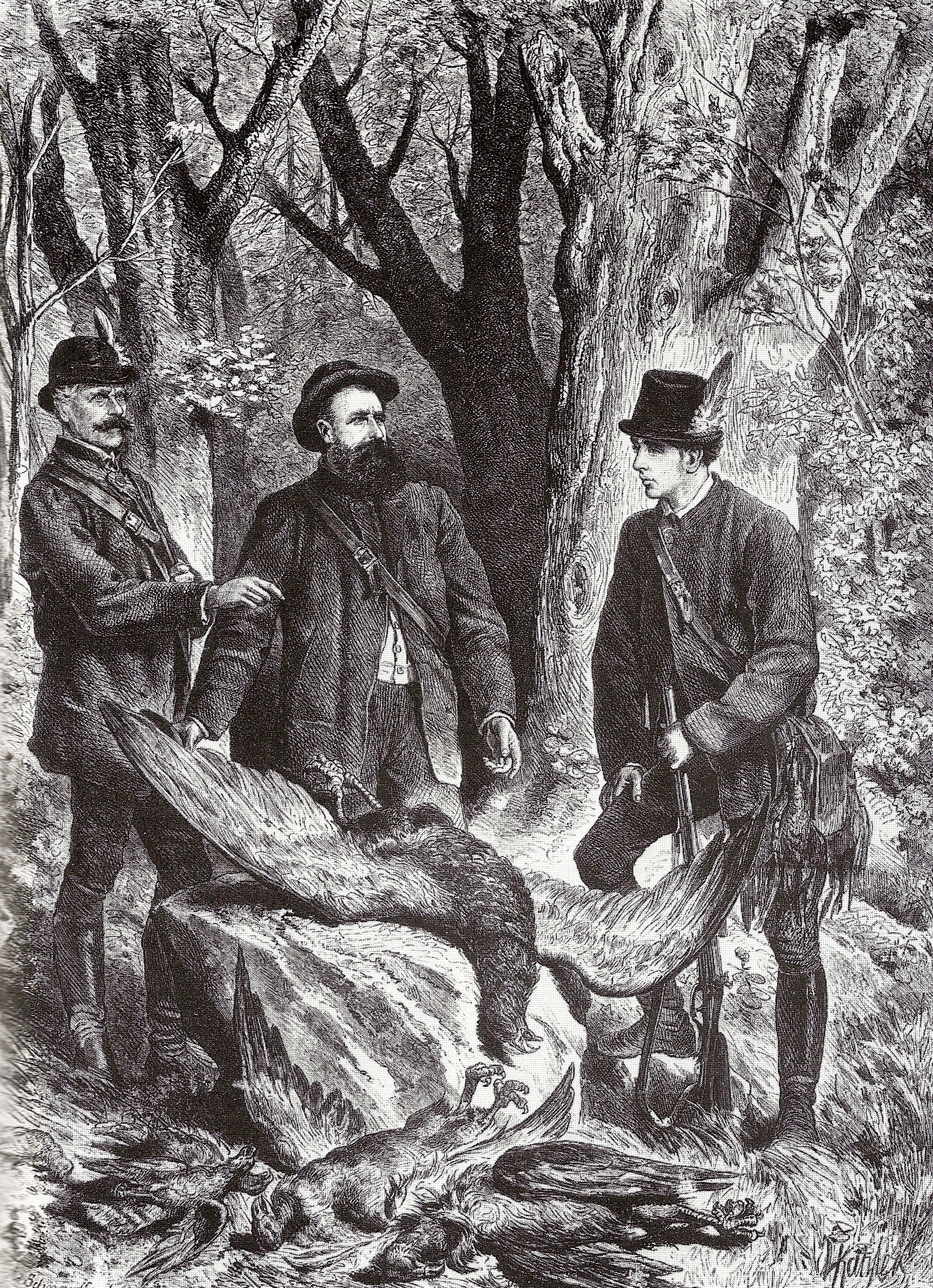
Homeyer, Brehm and Crown Prince Rudolf

Eugen Ferdinand von Homeyer was born in a family belonging to the Prussian nobility. He at first dedicated himself to agriculture on the family farm, with poor health forcing him to drop out of school in Rostock. While on his farm, he began to make scientific observations and establish a collection. In 1840 he married Philippine Ladewig and acquired in 1852 the property Warbelow where he built a landscape park. He sold this after the death of its wife in 1873 and then lived in Stolp, where he dedicated himself to the natural sciences and ornithology. He corresponded with many European ornithologists, and through further collecting and purchase built up an important collection of European bird species. He undertook several expeditions with Alfred Brehm to the Lower Danube. This was made possible through his acquaintance with the Crown Prince Rudolf of Austria. Homeyer was against the ideas of Charles Darwin and was a firm follower of Georges Cuvier's idea that species were created periodically and some destroyed in catastrophes. From 1883 he began to violently dispute the ideas of others and earned disrepute for his frequent polemics.

Homeyer was a founding member of the German Ornithological Society and from 1876 to 1883 their president. Homeyer died of a stroke and was buried at Warbelow. His collection of 20,000 bird specimens was transferred to the Braunschweig Natural History Museum. Eugen von Homeyer wrote over 150 articles on birds and was the first describer of the semi-collared flycatcher and the Cyprus wheatear. His cousin Alexander von Homeyer was also an ornithologist.

== Works ==
- Systematische Übersicht der Vögel Pommerns. Anklam 1837.
- Deutschlands Säugetiere und Vögel, ihr Nutzen und ihr Schaden. Frankfurt a. M. 1877.
- Die Spechte und ihr Wert in forstlicher Beziehung. 1879.
- Reise nach Helgoland, den Nordseeinseln Sylt, Jyst etc. 1880.
- Ornithologische Briefe. Berlin 1881.
- Die Wanderungen der Vögel. Leipzig 1881.
- Verzeichnis der Vögel Deutschlands. Wien 1885
