= Pogge =

Pogge is a name for the fish Agonus cataphractus.

Pogge is also a German surname. Notable people with the surname include:

- Justin Pogge (born 1986), Canadian hockey player
- Thomas Pogge (born 1953), German philosopher
- Paul Pogge (1838-1884), German explorer of Africa
- Brenda Pogge (born 1957), American politician
