= Wielichowo, Pomeranian Voivodeship =

Wielichowo
- Village
- Location within Poland
- Coordinates: 54°31′N 16°55′E
- Country: Poland
- Voivodeship: Pomeranian
- County: Słupsk
- Gmina: Słupsk
- Population: 111

Wielichowo [vjɛliˈxɔvɔ] (German Friedrichsthal) is a village in the administrative district of Gmina Słupsk, within Słupsk County, Pomeranian Voivodeship, in northern Poland.

The name is of the village is of native Slavic origin, and comes from the given name Wielich or Wielisław.

In the past, it was part of the village of Bruskowo Wielkie.
