= Leonhard Graf von Blumenthal =

Prussian field marshal (1810–1900)

Graf Leonhard von Blumenthal
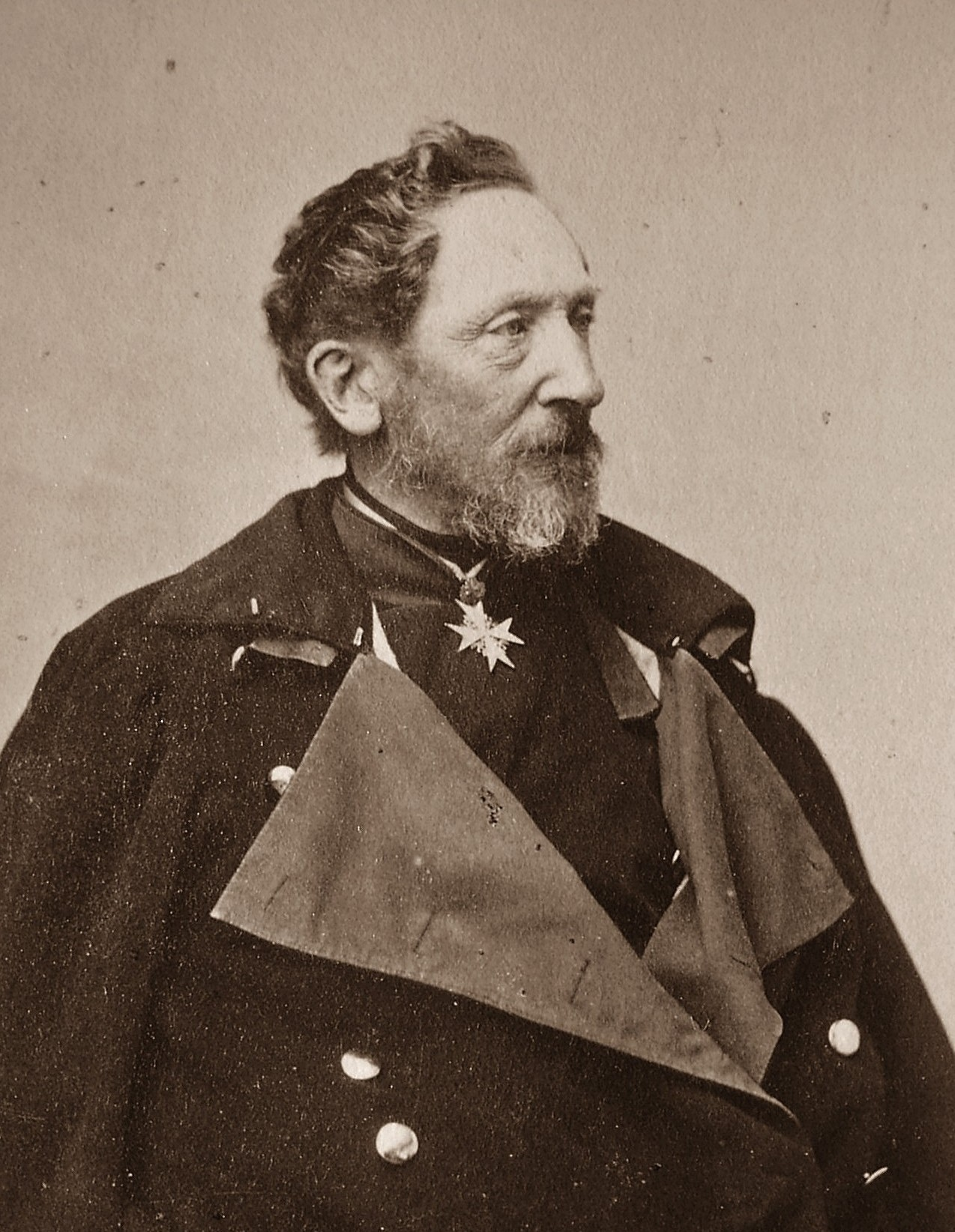
- Field Marshal von Blumenthal, wearing his Pour le Mérite
- Born: 30 July 1810; Schwedt, Kingdom of Prussia
- Died: 21 December 1900 (aged 90); Quellendorf, Province of Brandenburg, Kingdom of Prussia, German Empire
- Military career
- Allegiance: Kingdom of Prussia; German Confederation; North German Confederation; German Empire
- Branch: Prussian Army; Imperial German Army
- Rank: Generalfeldmarschall
- Commands: 14th Infantry Division; IV Corps
- Conflicts: First Schleswig War; Second Schleswig War; Austro-Prussian War; Franco-Prussian War
- Awards: Pour le Mérite with Oak Leaves; Iron Cross (1870); Military Order of Savoy (Italy); Order of St. George (Russia)

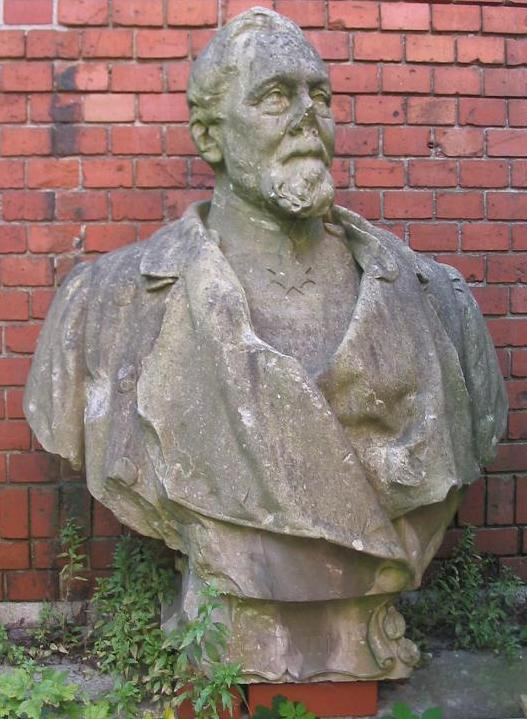
Statue of Blumenthal

Karl Konstantin Albrecht Leonhard Graf von Blumenthal (30 July 1810 – 21 December 1900) was an officer of the Prussian Army and field marshal of the Imperial German Army, chiefly remembered for his decisive intervention at the Battle of Königgrätz in 1866, his victories at Wörth and Weißenburg, and above all his refusal to bombard Paris in 1870 during the siege, of which he was in command.

== Early life ==
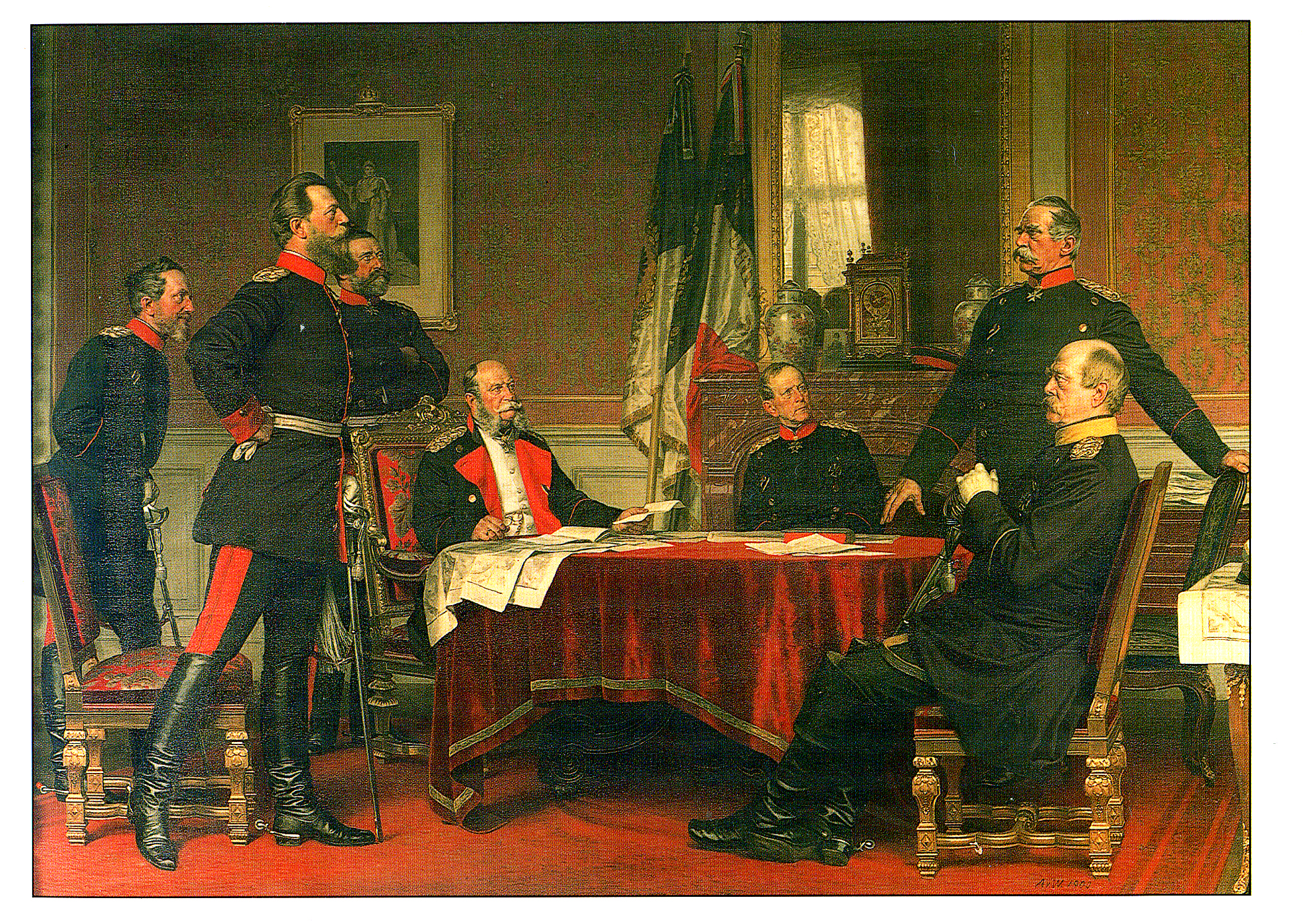
The German Headquarters at Versailles, 1870, by Anton von Werner. Leonhardt von Blumenthal standing to the left of the picture

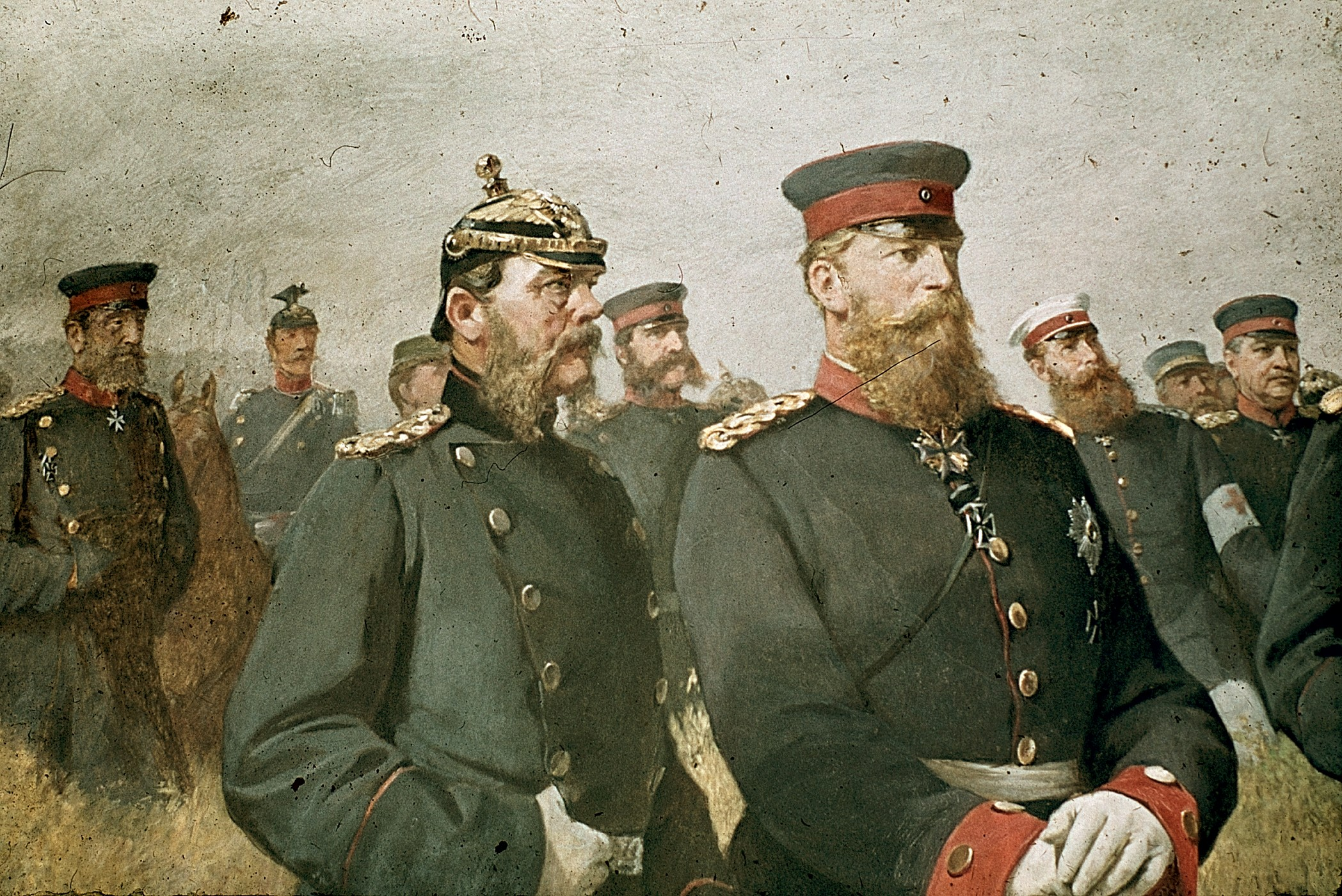
The Crown Prince of Saxony and the Crown Prince of Prussia. Leonhardt von Blumenthal at left of picture. From a painting by Carl Steffeck

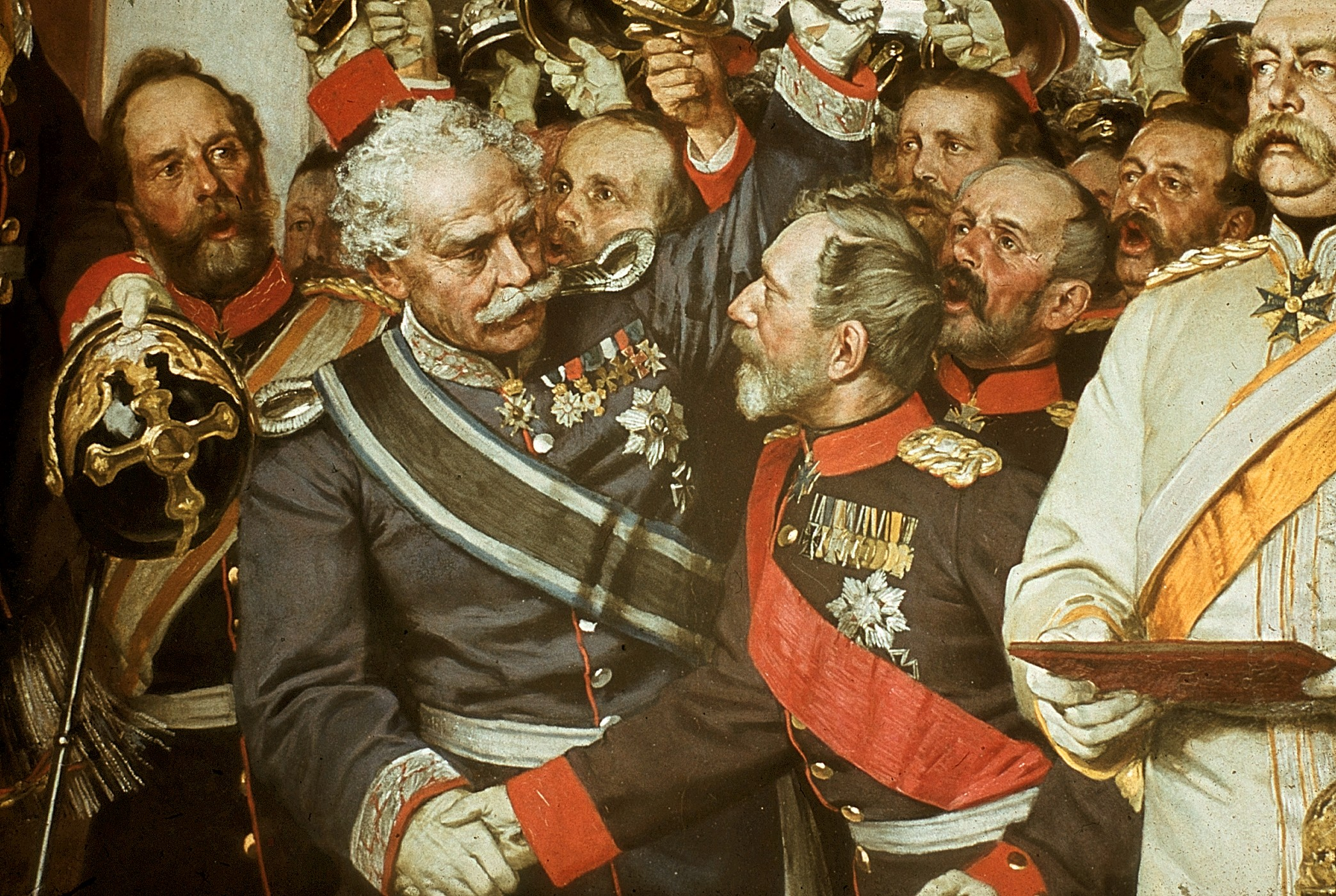
Leonhardt von Blumenthal next to Bismarck, shaking hands with General von Hartmann at the Proclamation of the German Empire at Versailles in 1871. Detail of a painting by Anton von Werner

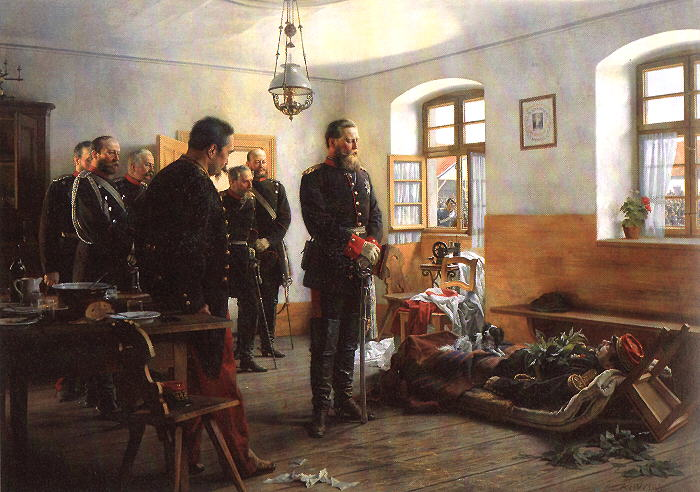
The Crown Prince visiting the body of General Douay after the victory at Weisenburg. Leonhardt von Blumenthal is the short man standing directly behind the Crown Prince.

Born in Schwedt, Brandenburg, on 30 July 1810, Leonhard was the son of Ludwig Albrecht von Blumenthal (1774–1813) and his wife Friederike Charlotte Dorothea von Below (1783–1853). Ludwig was a captain in the Brandenburg Dragoon Regiment who was wounded in the Battle of Dennewitz, and later died from his injuries at Potsdam. Leonhard had a younger brother, Karl (1811–1903), who would later serve as a major-general in the army.

Leonhard was brought up on his grandfather's estate at Reddentin in an aristocratic family, where his uncle Gustav von Below was founding what would become the Pentecostal movement. He was educated at the military schools of Culm and Berlin, entering the Guards as a 2nd lieutenant in 1827, and studied at the Berlin General War School (later called the Prussian Military Academy).

== Military career ==
After serving in the Rhine Province, von Blumenthal joined the topographical division of the general staff in 1846. As lieutenant of the 31st foot, he took part in 1848 in the suppression of the Berlin riots, and in 1849 was promoted captain on the general staff. The same year he served on the staff of General Eduard von Bonin in the First Schleswig War, and so distinguished himself, particularly at Fredericia, that he was appointed chief of the staff of the Schleswig-Holstein army, when the previous chief of staff, Captain von Delius, was killed.

In 1850, von Blumenthal was general staff officer of the mobile division under Tietzen in Hesse-Kassel. He was sent on a mission to England in that year (4th class of Red Eagle), and on several subsequent occasions. Having attained the rank of lieutenant-colonel, he was appointed personal adjutant to Prince Frederick Charles in 1859. In 1860 he became colonel of the 31st, and later of the 71st, regiment. He was chief of the staff of the III Corps when, on the outbreak of the Second Schleswig War of 1864, he was nominated chief of the general staff of the army against Denmark, and displayed so much ability, particularly at Dybbøl and the night attack on the island of Als, which he masterminded and which ended the war, that he was promoted to major-general and awarded the order Pour le Mérite.

In the Austro-Prussian War of 1866, von Blumenthal was Chief of Staff of the Second Army, commanded by the Crown Prince Frederick William. It was upon this army that the brunt of the fighting fell, and its arrival at Königgrätz saved the day. Von Blumenthal's own part in these battles and in the campaign generally was most conspicuous. At Königgrätz the crown prince said to him, "I know to whom I owe the conduct of my army", and von Blumenthal soon received promotion to lieutenant-general and the oak-leaves to the order Pour le Mérite. He was also made a knight of the Hohenzollern Order. From 1866 to 1870, he commanded the 14th Division at Düsseldorf.

In the Franco-Prussian War of 1870–71, von Blumenthal was chief of staff of the Third Army under the crown prince. Eighteen other members of his family also fought in this war, including both his sons and three nephews, of whom two were killed. Von Blumenthal's soldierly qualities and talent were most conspicuous in the critical days preceding the battle of Sedan, and his services in the war have been considered as scarcely less valuable and important than those of Moltke himself. Bismarck said:

So far as one can see, the papers make no mention of him, although he is chief of the staff to the Crown Prince and, next after Moltke, deserves most credit for the conduct of the war. ... He won the battles of Wörth and Wissembourg, and after that of Sedan, as the Crown Prince was not always interfering with his plans.

He directed the Siege of Paris and resisted calls to bombard it. He also directed the operations conducted by General von der Tann around Orleans, and defended the Grand Duke of Mecklenburg from interference by Moltke.

Von Blumenthal represented Germany at the British manoeuvres at Chobham in 1871, and was given the command of the IV Corps at Magdeburg. In 1873, he was promoted to general of the infantry, and ten years later he was given the title of Count. In 1888 he was made a general field marshal, after which he served as commander of the 4th and 3rd army inspections before eventually retiring in 1896.

In 1900, Kaiser Wilhelm II announced through the Court Circular that von Blumenthal would be made a Prince (Fürst). However, before this could be enacted the field marshal died that same year at Quellendorf near Köthen on 21 December. He was interred in the family crypt at Krampfer.

== Legacy ==
He was noted (among others by the English journalist William Howard Russell who followed him during the Franco-Prussian War) for his kindliness and sense of humour.

Like the Crown Prince, Moltke and other key Prussian leaders, he had an English wife, Delicia Vyner and it was widely thought in conservative circles that this was the basis of a liberal Prussian clique. His least appreciated but arguably most important work was the development of the doctrine of Fire and Infiltration, the basis of Blitzkrieg.

== Titles, honours and awards ==
- Honorary Citizen of the City of Düsseldorf, 1871
- Fort No. XII of the Straßburg Fortress, a military barracks in Halle, and a colliery in Recklinghausen, named in his honour, 2 September 1873
- Honorary Member of the Swedish Academy of Sciences, 1 April 1876
- Granted the noble title of Count (Graf), 1883

=== Orders and decorations ===
- Prussia:
  - Knight of the Red Eagle, 4th Class with Swords, 1853; 2nd Class with Oak Leaves, 1864; 1st Class, 1871; Grand Cross with Swords on Ring, 13 September 1876; with Crown, 12 June 1892
  - Knight of the Royal Crown Order, 2nd Class, 22 September 1863; with Swords, 1864
  - Pour le Mérite (military), 22 April 1864; with Oak Leaves, 17 September 1866; in Diamonds, 22 April 1898
  - Service Award Cross
  - Commander's Cross of the Royal House Order of Hohenzollern, with Star and Swords, 20 September 1866
  - Iron Cross (1870), 1st Class
  - Knight of the Black Eagle, 21 July 1877; with Collar, 24 January 1878; in Diamonds 18 October 1895
- Hohenzollern: Cross of Honour of the Princely House Order of Hohenzollern, 1st Class with Swords
- Anhalt: Grand Cross of the Order of Albert the Bear, 1872
- (Austrian Empire) (Kingdom of Hungary) Austria-Hungary:
  - Grand Cross of the Imperial Order of Leopold, with War Decoration, 1875
  - Grand Cross of the Royal Hungarian Order of St. Stephen, 1889
- Baden: Commander of the Military Karl-Friedrich Merit Order, 1870
- Bavaria:
  - Commander of the Military Order of Max Joseph, 18 October 1870
  - Knight of St. Hubert
  - Grand Cross of the Military Merit Order
- Brunswick: Grand Cross of the Order of Henry the Lion, with Swords, 1892
- (Saxe-Coburg and Gotha) (Duchy of Saxe-Altenburg) (Saxe-Meiningen) Ernestine duchies: Grand Cross of the Saxe-Ernestine House Order, with Swords, 1877
- France: Commander of the Legion of Honour
- Hanover: Commander of the Royal Guelphic Order, 2nd Class, 1861
- Italy:
  - Grand Cross of Saints Maurice and Lazarus
  - Grand Cross of the Military Order of Savoy
- Mecklenburg:
  - Grand Cross of the Wendish Crown, with Golden Crown
  - Military Merit Cross, 1st Class (Schwerin)
- Oldenburg: Grand Cross of the Order of Duke Peter Friedrich Ludwig, with Swords, 31 December 1870; with Golden Crown and Swords on Ring
- Reuss: Cross of Honour, 1st Class with Crown
- Russia:
  - Knight of St. George, 4th Class, 27 December 1870
  - Knight of St. Alexander Nevsky, 1876
- Saxe-Weimar-Eisenach: Grand Cross of the White Falcon, with Swords, 1870
- Saxony:
  - Grand Cross of the Order of Merit, 1876
  - Grand Cross of the Albert Order, with Golden Star, 1883
  - Knight of the Rue Crown, 1884
- Schaumburg-Lippe: Military Merit Medal, with Swords
- Schwarzburg: Princely Schwarzburg Cross of Honour, 1st Class with Swords and in Diamonds
- Spain: Grand Cross of the Order of Charles III, with Collar, 3 December 1883
- Sweden-Norway:
  - Knight of the Seraphim, 12 May 1873
  - Commander of the Sword, 2nd Class
- Württemberg:
  - Grand Cross of the Military Merit Order, 30 December 1870
  - Grand Cross of the Württemberg Crown, 1893

Military offices
Preceded by New Formation	Commander, IV Army Inspection; 22 March 1873 – 27 June 1892	Succeeded by General der Kavallerie Prince Leopold of Bavaria
