= Wieszyno =

- Village
- Location within Poland
- Coordinates: 54°27′26″N 17°7′50″E
- Country: Poland
- Voivodeship: Pomeranian
- County: Słupsk
- Gmina: Słupsk
- Population: 270

Wieszyno [vjɛˈʂɨnɔ] (German: Vessin) is a village in the administrative district of Gmina Słupsk, within Słupsk County, Pomeranian Voivodeship, in northern Poland.
