= Jezierzyce, Pomeranian Voivodeship =

Jezierzyce
- Village
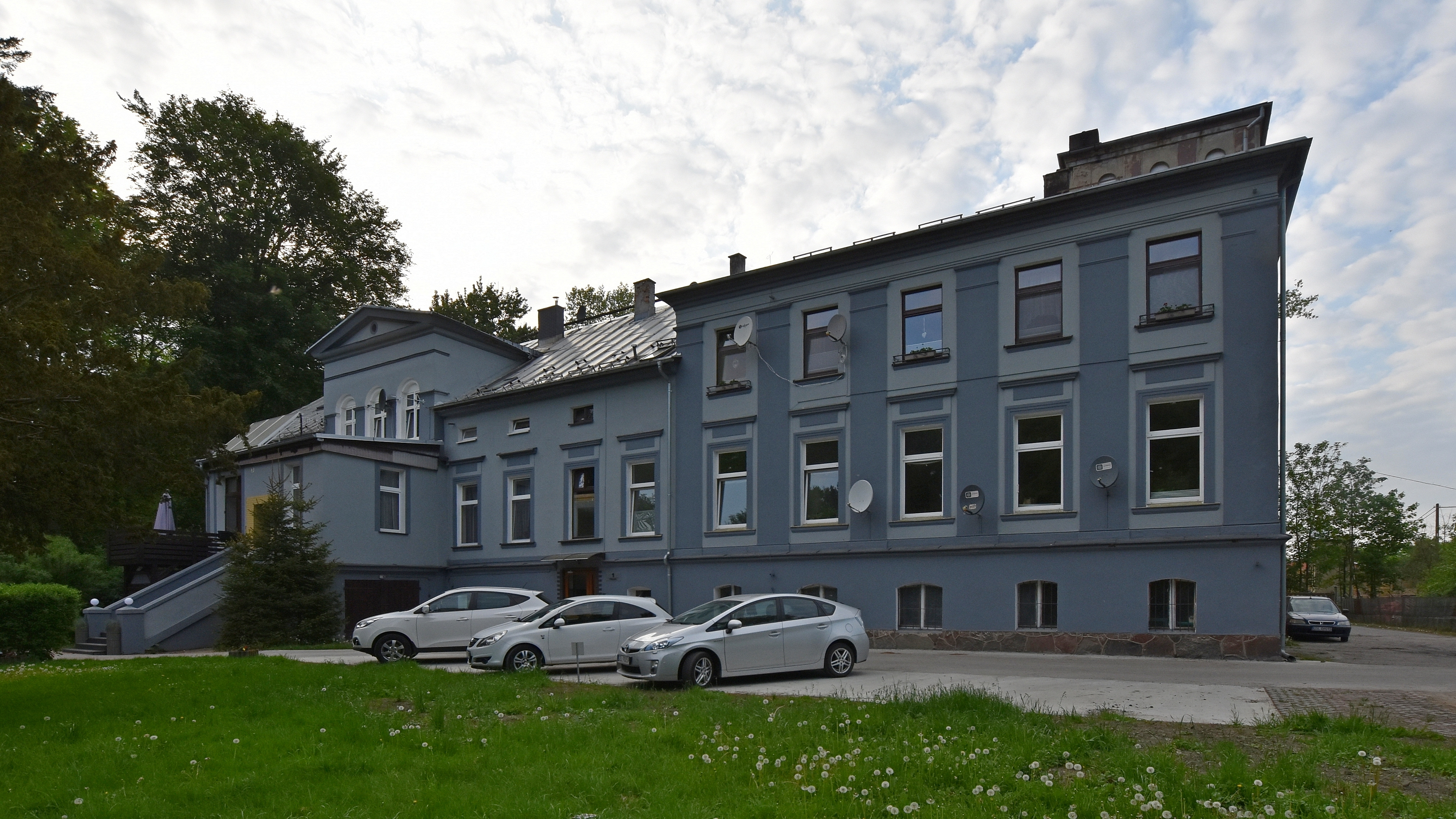
- Former palace in Jezierzyce

- Location within Poland
- Coordinates: 54°29′37″N 17°6′45″E
- Country: Poland
- Voivodeship: Pomeranian
- County: Słupsk
- Gmina: Słupsk

Population
  - Total: 349
- Time zone: UTC+1 (CET)
  - Summer (DST): UTC+2 (CEST)
- Vehicle registration: GSL

Jezierzyce [jɛʑɛˈʐɨt͡sɛ] is a village in the administrative district of Gmina Słupsk, within Słupsk County, Pomeranian Voivodeship, in northern Poland.

It is a linear settlement.

== Etymology ==
The name of the village comes from the Polish word jezioro, which means "lake".
