= Redzikowo-Osiedle =

- Village
- Location within Poland
- Coordinates: 54°28′18″N 17°7′3″E
- Country: Poland
- Voivodeship: Pomeranian
- County: Słupsk
- Gmina: Słupsk

Population
  - Total: 1,246
- Time zone: UTC+1 (CET)
  - Summer (DST): UTC+2 (CEST)
- Vehicle registration: GSL

Redzikowo-Osiedle [rɛd͡ʑiˈkɔvɔ ɔˈɕɛdlɛ] is a village in the administrative district of Gmina Słupsk, within Słupsk County, Pomeranian Voivodeship, in northern Poland.

== Etymology ==
The name of the village comes from the old Slavic male name Redzik, Radzik or Razik.
