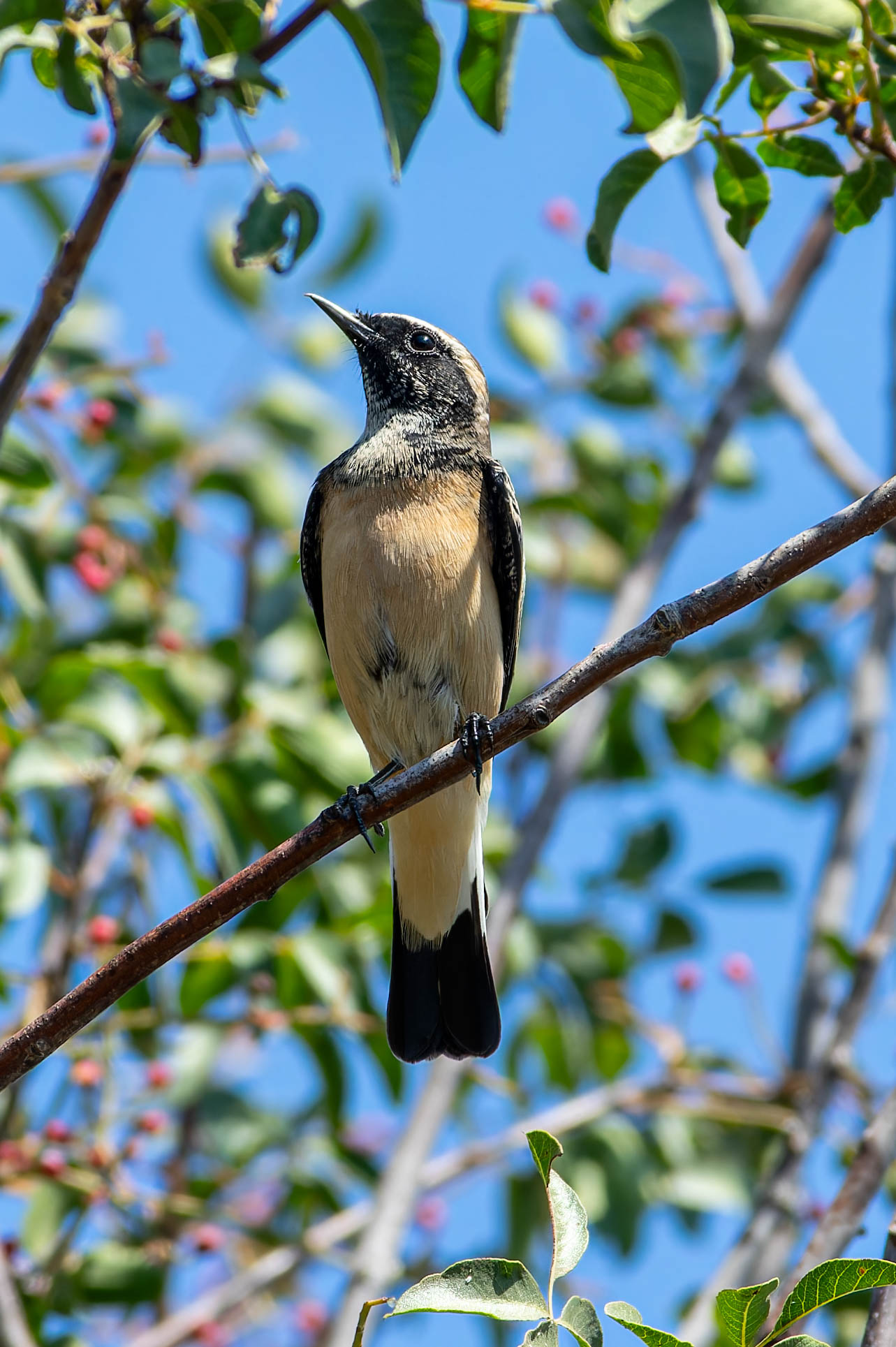
- Akamas, Cyprus

Conservation status
- Least Concern (IUCN 3.1)

Scientific classification
- Kingdom: Animalia
- Phylum: Chordata
- Class: Aves
- Order: Passeriformes
- Family: Muscicapidae
- Genus: Oenanthe
- Species: O. cypriaca

Binomial name
- Oenanthe cypriaca (Homeyer, 1885)

= Cyprus wheatear =

Species of bird

The Cyprus wheatear or Cyprus pied wheatear (Oenanthe cypriaca) is a small, 14–15 cm long passerine bird that was formerly classed as a member of the thrush family Turdidae, but is now more generally considered to be an Old World flycatcher, Muscicapidae. It was formerly treated as a subspecies (race) of pied wheatear but Sluys and van den Berg (1982) argued that the form deserved full species status, on the basis of differences in biometrics and especially song, and the lack of sexual plumage dimorphism in cypriaca.

This migratory insectivorous species breeds only in Cyprus, and winters in southern Sudan and Ethiopia. It has been recorded as a vagrant on Heligoland, Germany.

This species closely resembles pied wheatear, although it has slightly more black on the tail and back, and on the head. The sexes are similar in appearance, a fact first documented by Christensen (1974). A 2010 study found that Cyprus wheatear differs from pied wheatear in fourteen external morphometric characters.

The song is distinctive, and very different from that of pied wheatear, resembling an insect. It consists of a series of high-pitched buzzing bursts.

The song-perches utilised by this species are high for a wheatear, typically being 5 to 10 metres above ground. It often breeds in woodland habitats, unlike other wheatears (Oliver 1990 suggested that it occupies the ecological niche used elsewhere in the Western Palearctic by the common redstart). It is the most arboreal species of wheatear in the western palearctic and it uses often aerial sallying and perch-pounce-feeding tactics. Recent work suggest an ecological differentiation between Cyprus wheatear and migrating northern wheatears O. oenanthe and black-eared wheatears O. hispanica melanoleuca. Cyprus wheatear uses more aerial sallying and occupies more forested habitats, but needs a minimum amount of open/bare ground, and a minimum of high bush/tree vegetation (Randler et al. 2009).

== Gallery ==
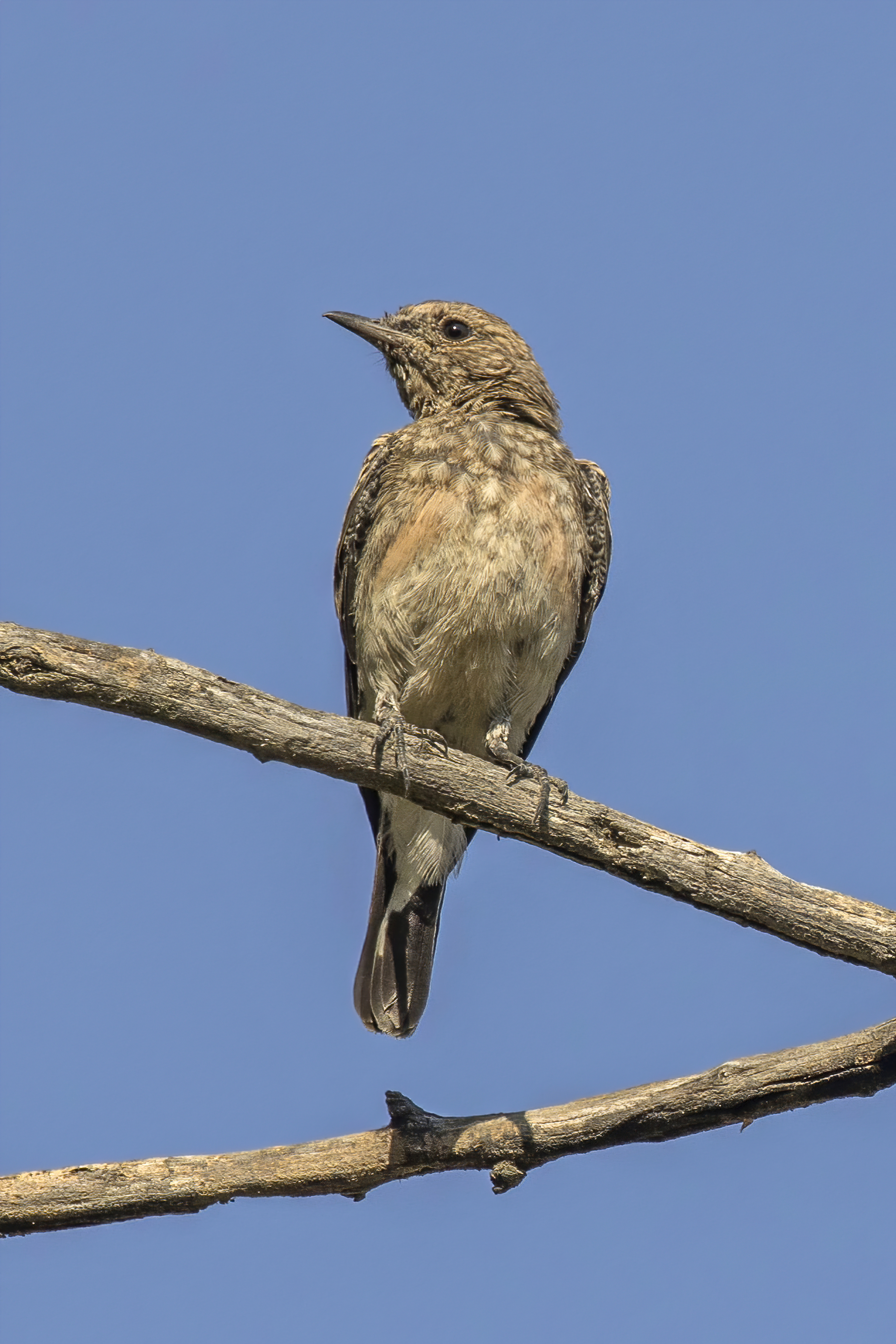
juvenile

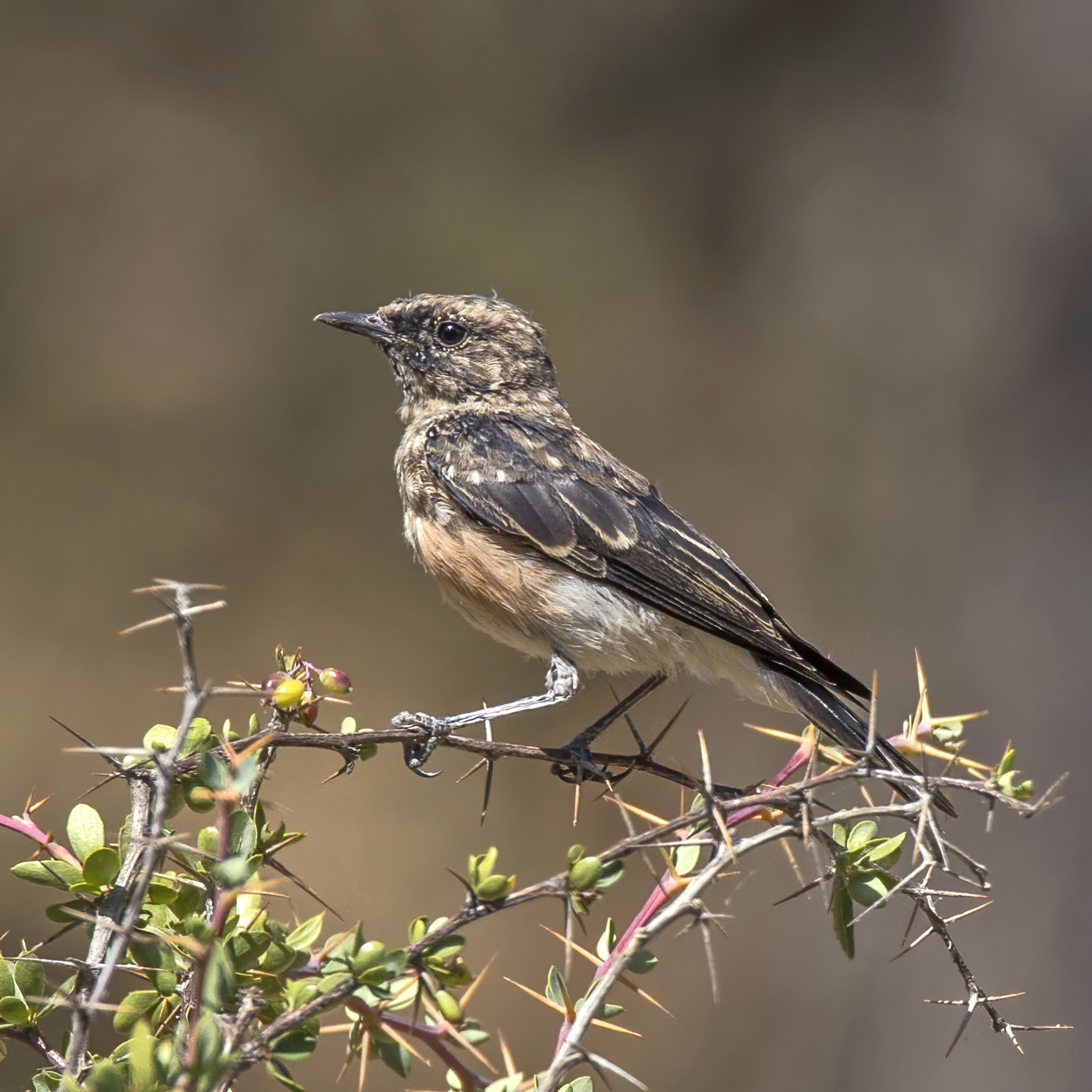
juvenile

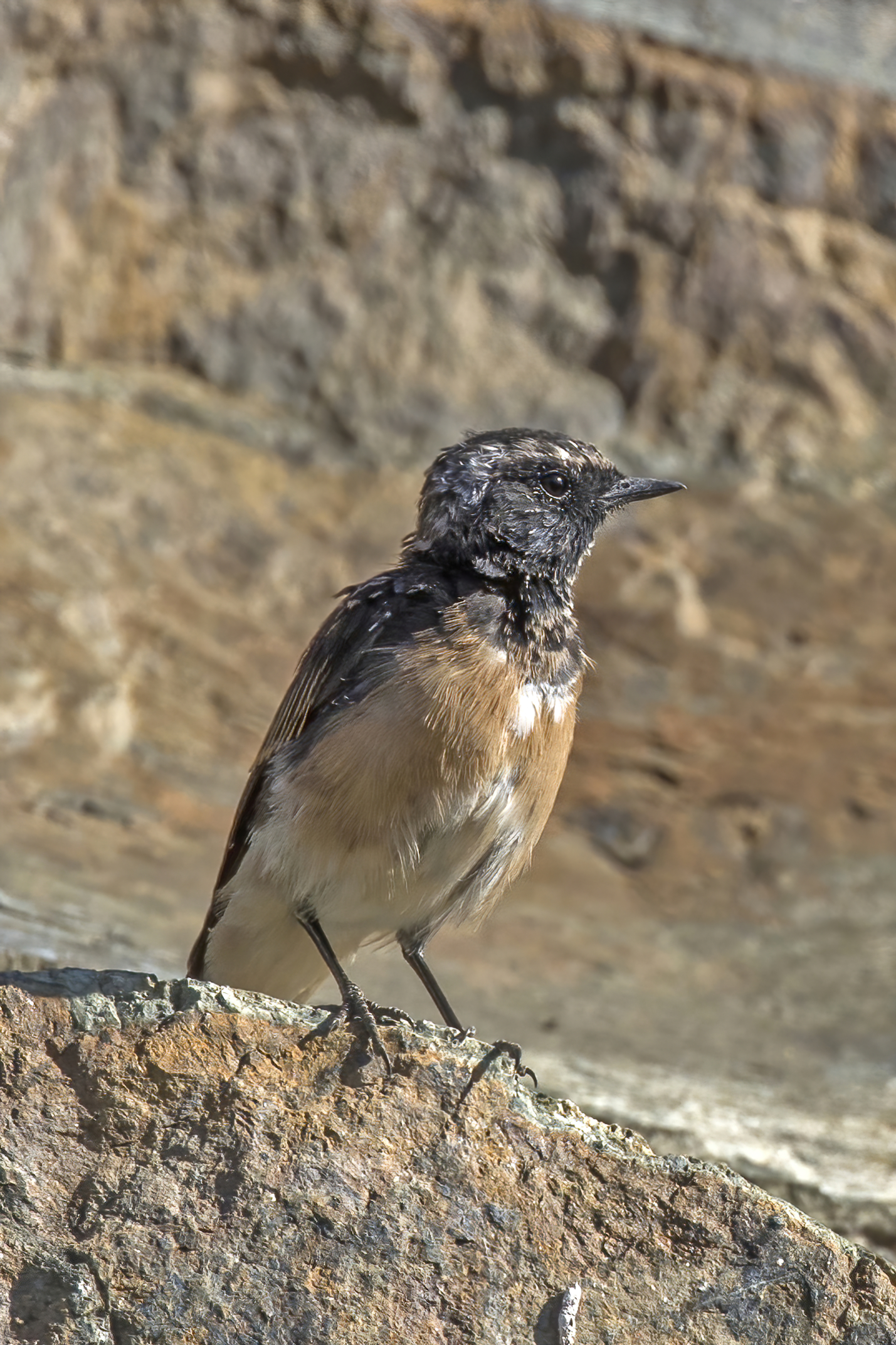
juvenile/sub-adult

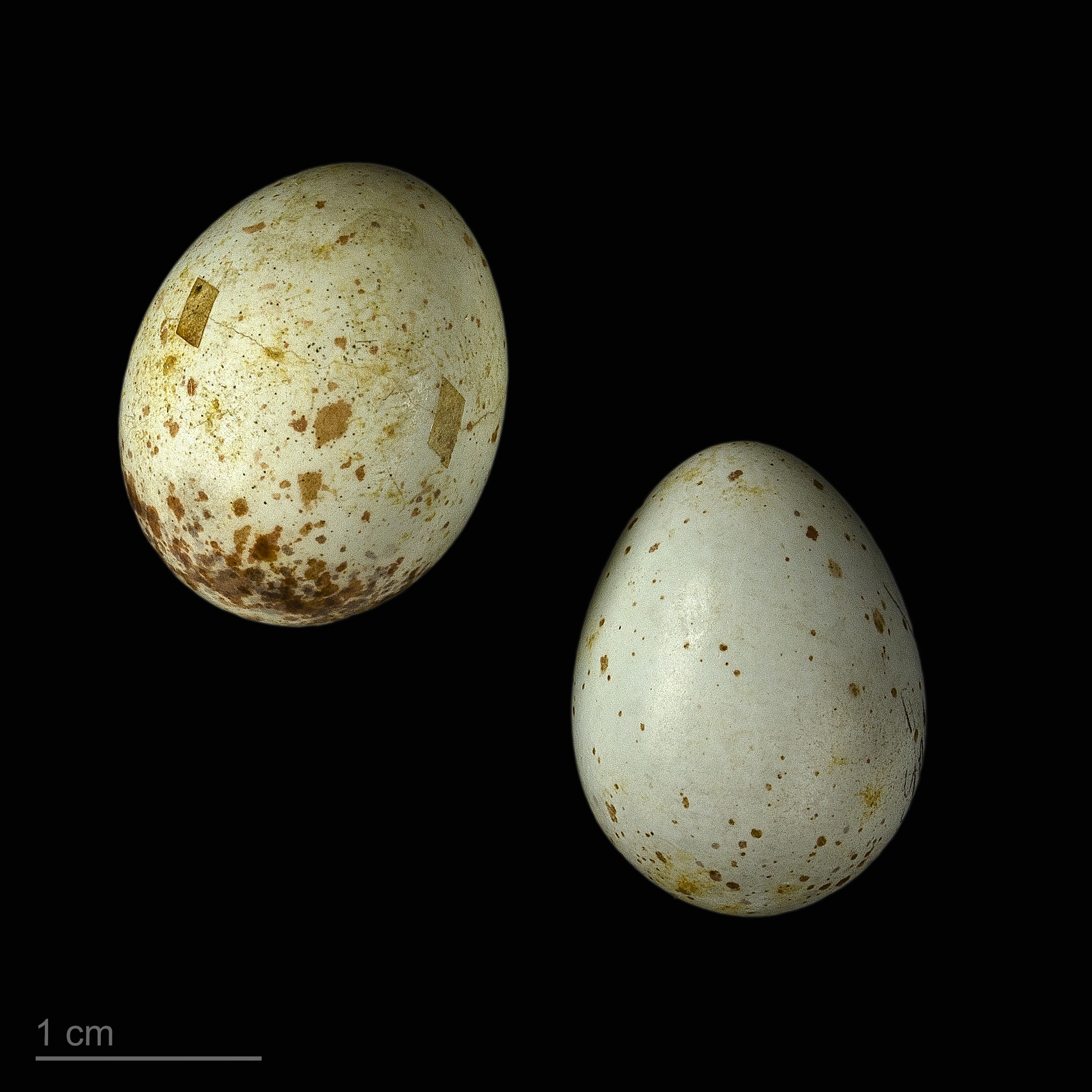
Oenanthe cypriaca - MHNT
