= Niewierowo =

- Village
- Location within Poland
- Coordinates: 54°29′59″N 17°2′42″E
- Country: Poland
- Voivodeship: Pomeranian
- County: Słupsk
- Gmina: Słupsk
- Population: 68

Niewierowo [ɲɛvjɛˈrɔvɔ] is a village in the administrative district of Gmina Słupsk, within Słupsk County, Pomeranian Voivodeship, in northern Poland.
