= Zamełowo =

- Settlement
- Location within Poland
- Coordinates: 54°31′59″N 16°54′55″E
- Country: Poland
- Voivodeship: Pomeranian
- County: Słupsk
- Gmina: Słupsk

Zamełowo [zamɛˈwɔvɔ] is a settlement in the administrative district of Gmina Słupsk, within Słupsk County, Pomeranian Voivodeship, in northern Poland.

For the history of the region, see History of Pomerania.
