= Grąsino =

- Village
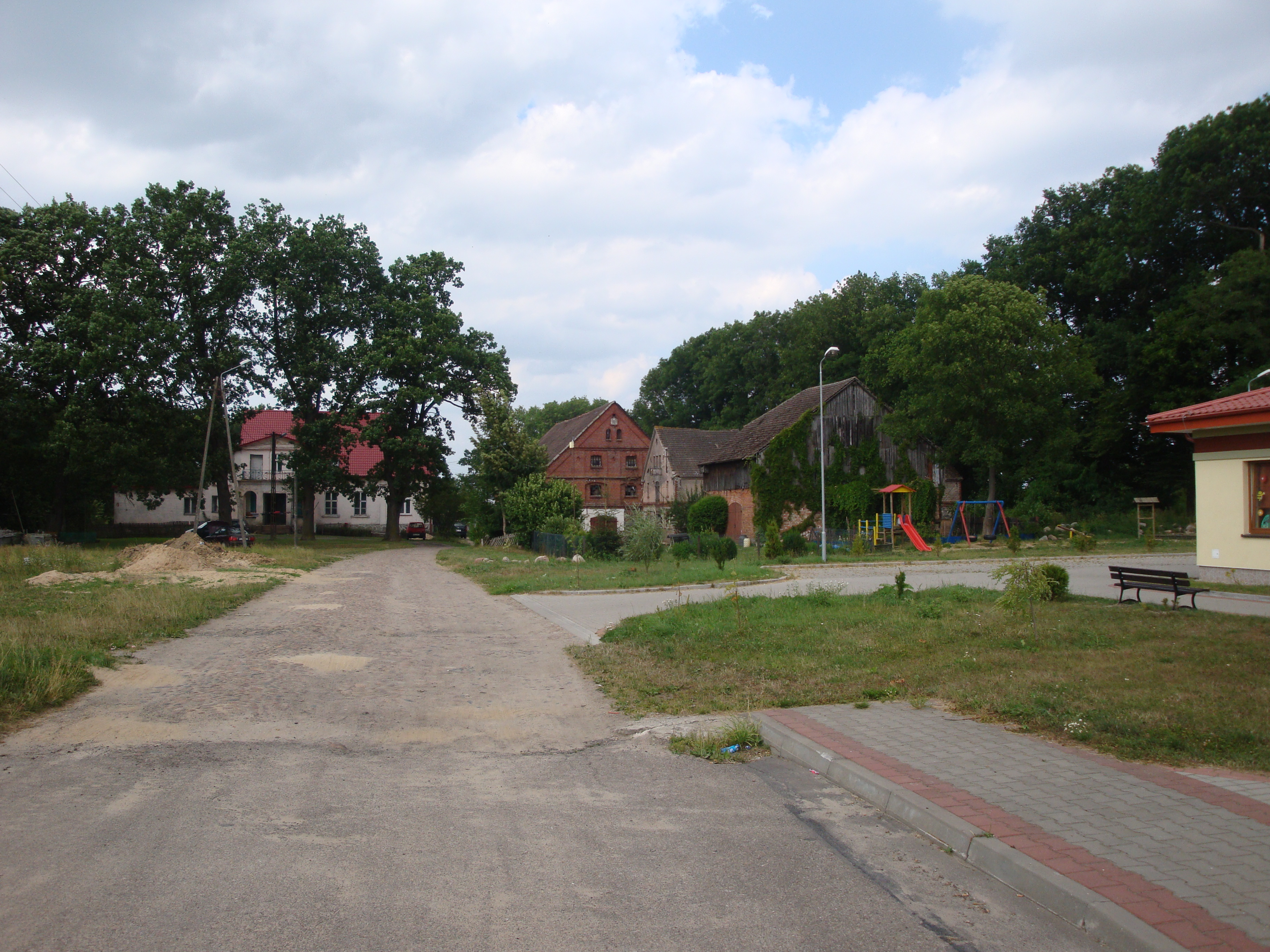
- Centre of village

- Location within Poland
- Coordinates: 54°29′55″N 17°8′31″E
- Country: Poland
- Voivodeship: Pomeranian
- County: Słupsk
- Gmina: Słupsk
- Population: 522

Grąsino [ɡrɔ̃ˈɕinɔ] (German: Granzin) is a village in the administrative district of Gmina Słupsk, within Słupsk County, Pomeranian Voivodeship, in northern Poland.

For the history of the region, see History of Pomerania.
