= Gmina Redzikowo =

Gmina Redzikowo Redzikowo Commune
- Gmina
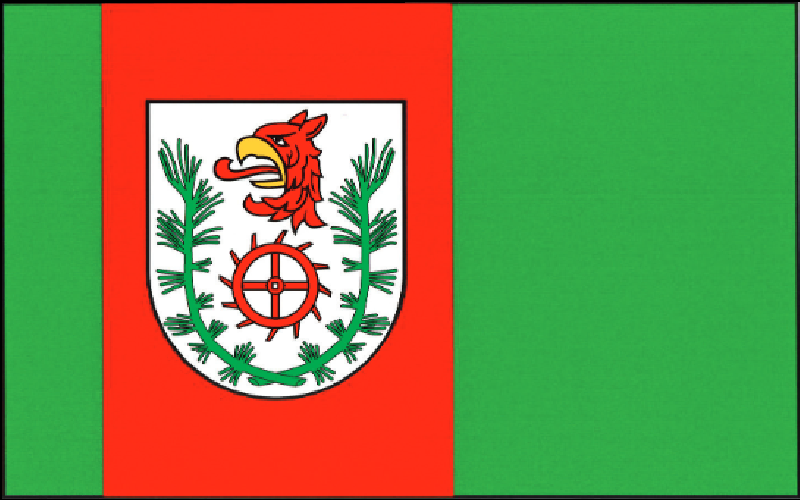
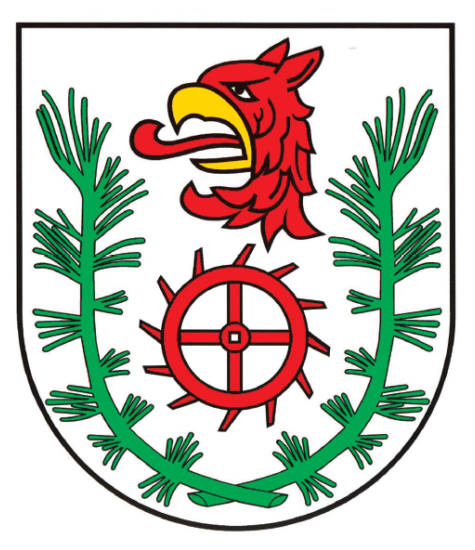
- Flag Coat of arms
- Interactive map of Gmina Redzikowo
- Coordinates (Słupsk): 54°27′57″N 17°1′45″E
- Country: Poland
- Voivodeship: Pomeranian
- County: Słupsk County
- Seat: Słupsk

Area
  - Total: 260.58 km^{2} (100.61 sq mi)

Population (2022)
  - Total: 18,145
  - Density: 69.633/km^{2} (180.35/sq mi)
- Website: https://www.gminaredzikowo.pl/47/strona-startowa.html

Gmina Redzikowo is a rural gmina (administrative district) in Słupsk County, Pomeranian Voivodeship, in northern Poland. Its seat is the town of Słupsk, although the town is not part of the territory of the gmina.

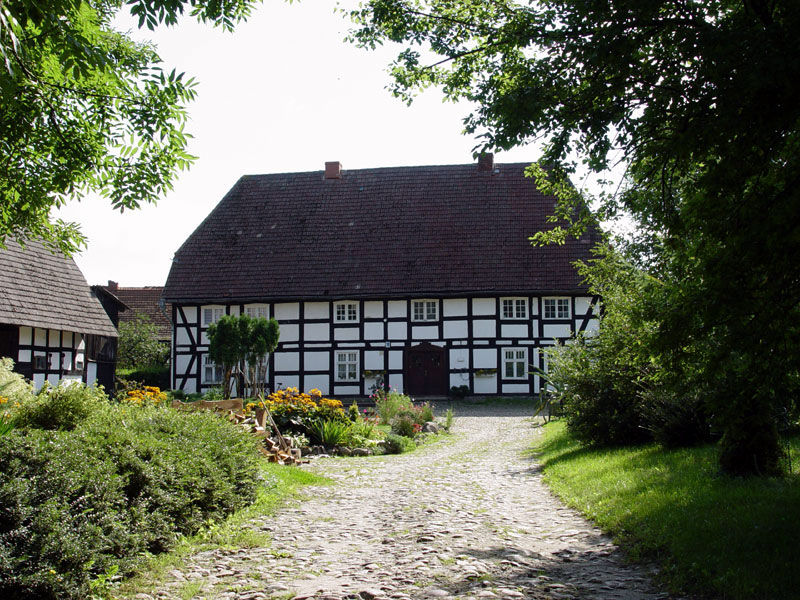

Before 2023 the gmina covered an area of 260.58 square kilometres (100.6 sq mi), and as of 31 December 2022 its total population was 18 145.

In 2023 the gmina lost 9.56 square kilometres (3.7 sq mi) of its area to the city of Słupsk.

Since 1 January 2024 the gmina has had its name changed from Gmina Słupsk to Gmina Redzikowo. It was part of a political tension between the gmina and the city of Słupsk regarding the expansion of the municipal area.

The gmina contains part of the protected area called Słupia Valley Landscape Park.

== Villages ==
Gmina Redzikowo contains the villages and settlements of Bierkowo, Bruskowo Małe, Bruskowo Wielkie, Bukówka, Bydlino, Gać, Gać Leśna, Gajki, Gałęzinowo, Głobino, Grąsino, Jezierzyce, Jezierzyce-Osiedle, Karżcino, Kępno, Krępa Słupska, Krzemienica, Kukowo, Kusowo, Łękwica, Lubuczewo, Łupiny, Miednik, Niewierowo, Płaszewko, Redęcin, Redzikowo, Redzikowo-Osiedle, Rogawica, Siemianice, Stanięcino, Strzelinko, Strzelino, Swochowo, Swołowo, Warblewko, Warblewo, Wielichowo, Wierzbięcin, Wieszyno, Wiklino, Włynkówko, Włynkowo, Wrzeście and Zamełowo.

== Neighbouring gminas ==
Gmina Redzikowo is bordered by the city of Słupsk and by the gminas of Damnica, Dębnica Kaszubska, Główczyce, Kępice, Kobylnica, Postomino, Smołdzino and Ustka.

== Sources ==
- Gmina Redzikowo website (Polish)
