= Łupiny, Pomeranian Voivodeship =

Łupiny
- Settlement
- Location within Poland
- Coordinates: 54°24′14″N 17°6′54″E
- Country: Poland
- Voivodeship: Pomeranian
- County: Słupsk
- Gmina: Słupsk

Population
  - Total: 6
- Postal code: 76-200

Łupiny [wuˈpinɨ] is a settlement in the administrative district of Gmina Słupsk, within Słupsk County, Pomeranian Voivodeship, in northern Poland.
