= Płaszewko =

- Village
- Location within Poland
- Coordinates: 54°25′41″N 17°04′19″E
- Country: Poland
- Voivodeship: Pomeranian
- County: Słupsk
- Gmina: Słupsk
- Population: 103

Płaszewko [pwaˈʂɛfkɔ] (German: Plassow) is a village in the administrative district of Gmina Słupsk, within Słupsk County, Pomeranian Voivodeship, in northern Poland.

For the history of the region, see History of Pomerania.
