= Gałęzinowo =

- Village
- Location within Poland
- Coordinates: 54°31′N 16°55′E
- Country: Poland
- Voivodeship: Pomeranian
- County: Słupsk
- Gmina: Słupsk
- Population: 280

Gałęzinowo [ɡawɛ̃ʑiˈnɔvɔ] (German: Überlauf) is a village in the administrative district of Gmina Słupsk, within Słupsk County, Pomeranian Voivodeship, in northern Poland.
