= Krzemienica, Pomeranian Voivodeship =

Krzemienica
- Village
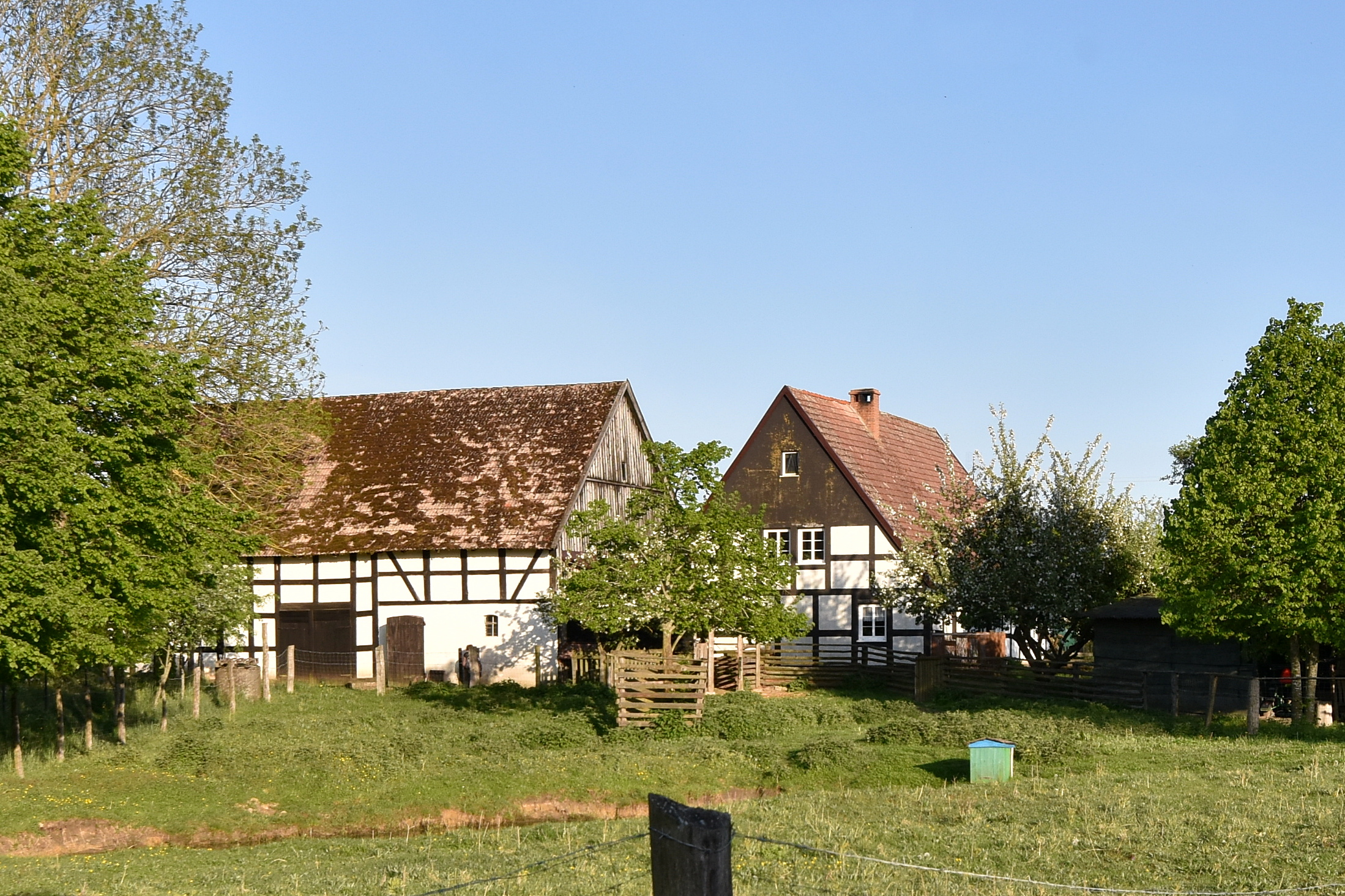

- Location within Poland
- Coordinates: 54°29′21″N 16°49′23″E
- Country: Poland
- Voivodeship: Pomeranian
- County: Słupsk
- Gmina: Słupsk
- Population: 159

Krzemienica [kʂɛmjɛˈnit͡sa] (German: Steinwald) is a village in the administrative district of Gmina Słupsk, within Słupsk County, Pomeranian Voivodeship, in northern Poland.

For the history of the region, see History of Pomerania.
