= Bukówka, Pomeranian Voivodeship =

Bukówka
- Village
- Location within Poland
- Coordinates: 54°31′10″N 17°5′51″E
- Country: Poland
- Voivodeship: Pomeranian
- County: Redzikowo
- Gmina: Redzikowo
- Population: 352

Bukówka [buˈkufka] (German: Deutsch Buckow) is a village in the administrative district of Gmina Słupsk, within Słupsk County, Pomeranian Voivodeship, in northern Poland.
