= Włynkówko =

- Village
- Location within Poland
- Coordinates: 54°30′21″N 16°59′56″E
- Country: Poland
- Voivodeship: Pomeranian
- County: Słupsk
- Gmina: Słupsk
- Population: 476

Włynkówko [vwɨnˈkufkɔ] (German: Neu Flinkow) is a village in the administrative district of Gmina Słupsk, within Słupsk County, Pomeranian Voivodeship, in northern Poland.

In 2007 the village had a population of 476.
