= Jezierzyce-Osiedle =

- Village
- Location within Poland
- Coordinates: 54°30′17″N 17°7′28″E
- Country: Poland
- Voivodeship: Pomeranian
- County: Słupsk
- Gmina: Słupsk
- Population: 1,039

Jezierzyce-Osiedle [jɛʑɛˈʐɨt͡sɛ ɔˈɕɛdlɛ] is a village in the administrative district of Gmina Słupsk, within Słupsk County, Pomeranian Voivodeship, in northern Poland.

For the history of the region, see History of Pomerania.
