= Swołowo =

- Village
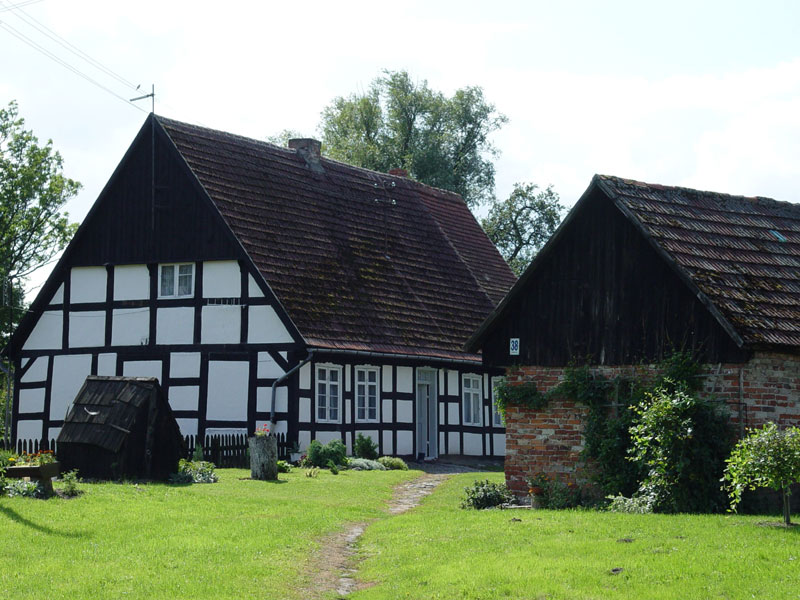
- The old school of Swołowo

- Location within Poland
- Coordinates: 54°28′37″N 16°50′25″E
- Country: Poland
- Voivodeship: Pomeranian
- County: Słupsk
- Gmina: Słupsk
- Population: 240

Swołowo [sfɔˈwɔvɔ] (German: Schwolow) is a village in the administrative district of Gmina Słupsk, within Słupsk County, Pomeranian Voivodeship, in northern Poland.
