= Wierzbięcin, Pomeranian Voivodeship =

Wierzbięcin
- Village
- Location within Poland
- Coordinates: 54°29′27″N 16°53′58″E
- Country: Poland
- Voivodeship: Pomeranian
- County: Słupsk
- Gmina: Słupsk
- Population: 86

Wierzbięcin [vjɛʐˈbjɛnt͡ɕin] (German: Grünhagen) is a village in the administrative district of Gmina Słupsk, within Słupsk County, Pomeranian Voivodeship, in northern Poland.
