= Warblewko =

- Village
- Location within Poland
- Coordinates: 54°26′2″N 17°10′57″E
- Country: Poland
- Voivodeship: Pomeranian
- County: Słupsk
- Gmina: Słupsk
- Population: 31

Warblewko [varˈblɛfkɔ] is a village in the administrative district of Gmina Słupsk, within Słupsk County, Pomeranian Voivodeship, in northern Poland.
