= Wiklino =

- Village
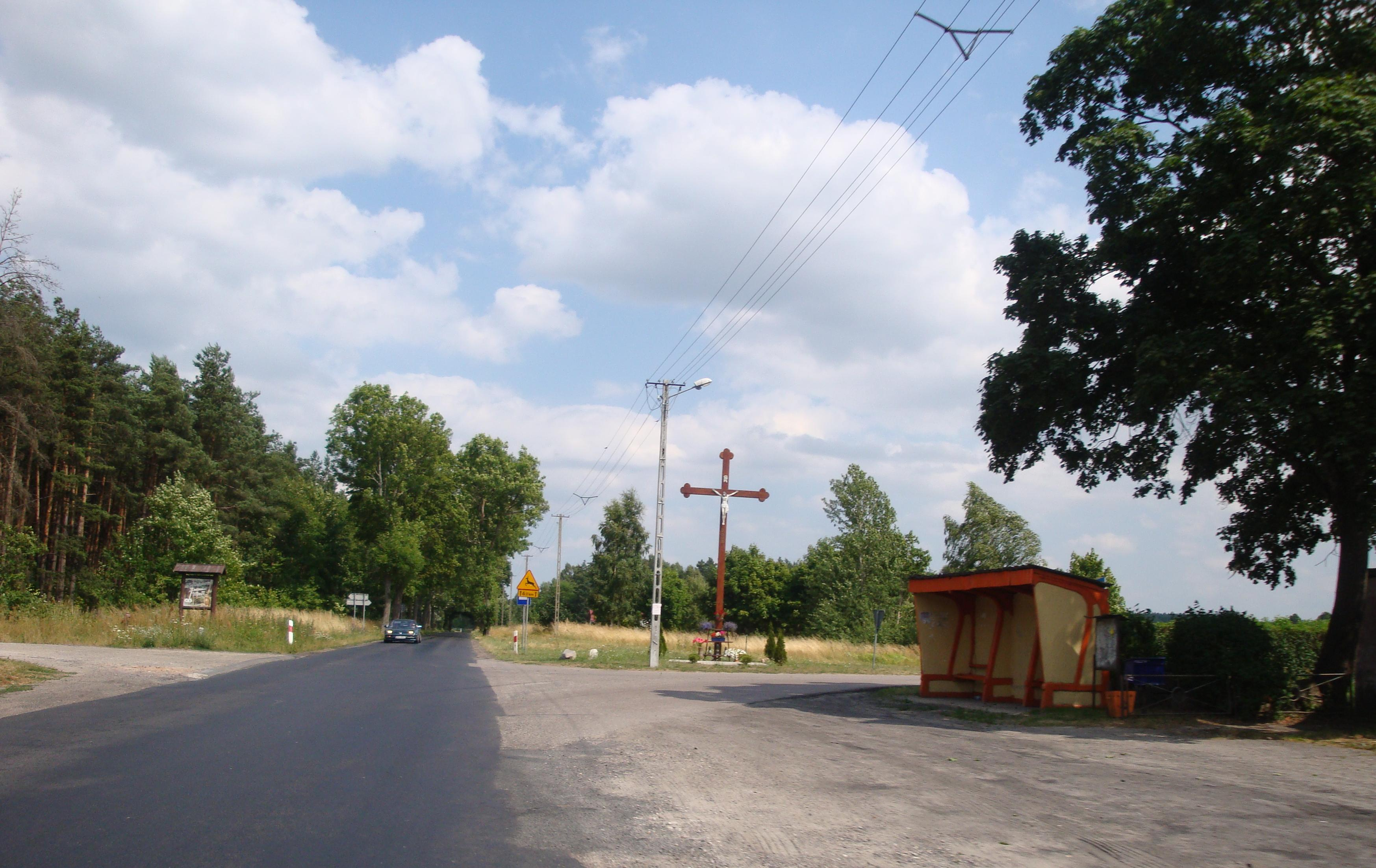
- Bus stop in village

- Location within Poland
- Coordinates: 54°33′2″N 17°8′28″E
- Country: Poland
- Voivodeship: Pomeranian
- County: Słupsk
- Gmina: Słupsk
- Population: 200

Wiklino [viˈklinɔ] (German Beckel) is a village in the administrative district of Gmina Słupsk, within Słupsk County, Pomeranian Voivodeship, in northern Poland.
