= Stanięcino =

- Village
- Location within Poland
- Coordinates: 54°26′N 17°6′E
- Country: Poland
- Voivodeship: Pomeranian
- County: Słupsk
- Gmina: Słupsk
- Population: 140

Stanięcino [staɲɛnˈt͡ɕinɔ] (German: Stantin) is a village in the administrative district of Gmina Słupsk, within Słupsk County, Pomeranian Voivodeship, in northern Poland.
