= Krępa Słupska =

- Village
- Location within Poland
- Coordinates: 54°25′2″N 17°3′26″E
- Country: Poland
- Voivodeship: Pomeranian
- County: Słupsk
- Gmina: Słupsk
- Population: 3,000

Krępa Słupska [ˈkrɛmpa ˈswupska] (German: Krampe) is a village in the administrative district of Gmina Słupsk, within Słupsk County, Pomeranian Voivodeship, in northern Poland. For the history of the region, see History of Pomerania.
