= Alexander von Homeyer =

German soldier and ornithologist

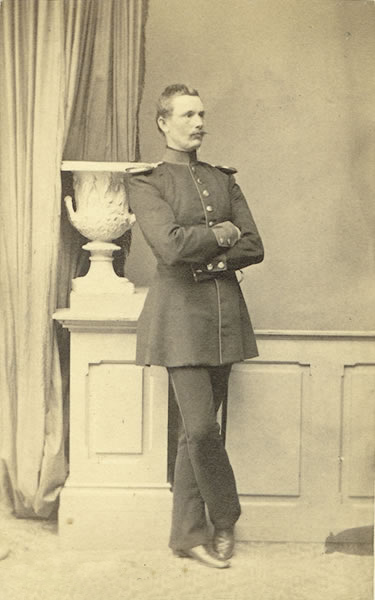
Alexander von Homeyer.

Alexander von Homeyer (19 January 1834, in Vorland, now a part of Splietsdorf – 14 July 1903, in Greifswald) was a German soldier and ornithologist. He was a cousin of Eugen Ferdinand von Homeyer, also an ornithologist.

Homeyer joined the Prussian army in 1852, and as an ensign served with the Silesian Füsilier-Regiment. In 1878 he retired from the military with the rank of major.

He took part in the second expedition of the German African society in 1874, in which he was accompanied by the explorer Paul Pogge. His other travels, during which he collected natural history specimens, included expeditions to the Mediterranean (including the Balearic Islands in 1861), Denmark, Hungary and the Balkans. From the years 1875 to 1884, he was, for the most part, engaged in systematic studies.

As a lepidopterist, he amassed a collection of around 50,000 butterflies. At his death, he left a collection of bird eggs that was one of the largest private collections known to exist — in 1906 it became part of the Senckenberg Nature Research Society.

He died at Greifswald.

== Selected writings ==
- Handschriftlicher Auszug aus George Robert Gray: Genera of birds - Handwritten excerpts from George Robert Gray's "Genera of birds".
- Mein [Schmetterlings-] Fang im Ober-Engadin 1876 und 1878, 1880 - Butterflies captured in Upper Engadine (1876, 1878).
- Die Wachholderdrossel Turdus pilaris, 1885 - The fieldfare.
- Uber meine erfolgreichen Zuchten der Hakengimpel (Corythusenucleator) in der Gefangenschaft, 1897 - On successful breeding of captive pine grosbeaks.
- Aus dem Leben eines pommerschen Ornithologen Briefe Alexander von Homeyers an Carl Bolle; 1857–1863, 1909 - From the life of a Pomeranian ornithologist. Letters from Alexander Homeyer to Carl Bolle (1857 to 1863).
