= Bruskowo Małe =

- Village
- Location within Poland
- Coordinates: 54°29′17″N 16°53′0″E
- Country: Poland
- Voivodeship: Pomeranian
- County: Słupsk
- Gmina: Słupsk

Population
  - Total: 113
- Time zone: UTC+1 (CET)
  - Summer (DST): UTC+2 (CEST)
- Postal code: 76-200
- Vehicle registration: GSL

Bruskowo Małe [brusˈkɔvɔ ˈmawɛ] (German: Klein Brüskow) is a village in the administrative district of Gmina Słupsk, within Słupsk County, Pomeranian Voivodeship, in northern Poland. It is located in the historic region of Pomerania.

The village was also known in Polish as Brzoskówko in the past.
