= Bierkowo =

- Village
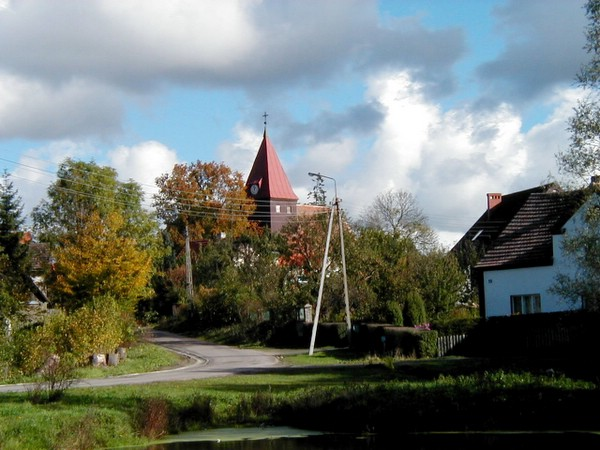
- View of the village (2003)

- Location within Poland
- Coordinates: 54°28′39″N 16°55′45″E
- Country: Poland
- Voivodeship: Pomeranian
- County: Słupsk
- Gmina: Słupsk
- Elevation: 62 m (203 ft)
- Population: 921 (2,008)

Bierkowo [bjɛrˈkɔvɔ] (German: Birkow) is a village in the administrative district of Gmina Słupsk, within Słupsk County, Pomeranian Voivodeship, in northern Poland.
