= Lubuczewo =

- Village
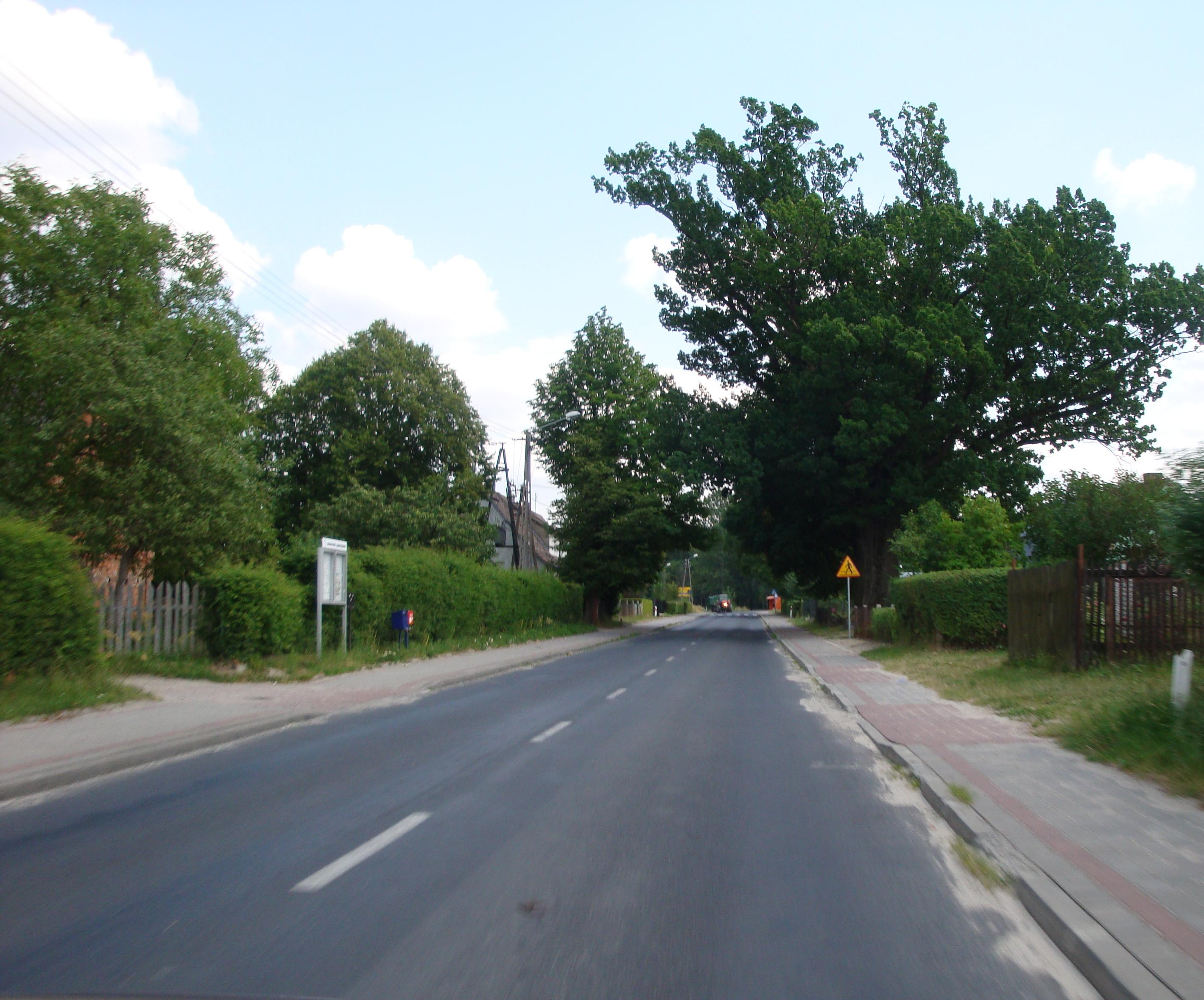

- Location within Poland
- Coordinates: 54°32′N 17°4′E
- Country: Poland
- Voivodeship: Pomeranian
- County: Słupsk
- Gmina: Słupsk
- First mentioned: 1320

Population
  - Total: 466
- Postal code: 76-200

Lubuczewo [lubuˈt͡ʂɛvɔ] (German: Lübzow) is a village in the administrative district of Gmina Słupsk, within Słupsk County, Pomeranian Voivodeship, in northern Poland.

The name of the village is of Slavic origin, and comes from the male name Lubucz or Lubiesz. The earliest known reference to the village comes from 1320.

The village was the home of the von Braunschweig, one of whom Eberhard, though a member of the anti-Nazi resistance was murdered by Red Army troops in March 1945.
