= Kusowo, Pomeranian Voivodeship =

Kusowo
- Village
- Location within Poland
- Coordinates: 54°26′1″N 17°5′5″E
- Country: Poland
- Voivodeship: Pomeranian
- County: Słupsk
- Gmina: Słupsk
- Population: 806

Kusowo [kuˈsɔvɔ] is a village in the administrative district of Gmina Słupsk, within Słupsk County, Pomeranian Voivodeship, in northern Poland.

For the history of the region, see History of Pomerania.
