= Wrzeście, Słupsk County =

Wrzeście
- Village
- Location within Poland
- Coordinates: 54°32′48″N 17°6′49″E
- Country: Poland
- Voivodeship: Pomeranian
- County: Słupsk
- Gmina: Słupsk
- Population: 405

Wrzeście [ˈvʐɛɕt͡ɕɛ] (German: Freist) is a village in the administrative district of Gmina Słupsk, within Słupsk County, Pomeranian Voivodeship, in northern Poland.

For the history of the region, see History of Pomerania.
