= Poggea =

Scientific classification
- Kingdom: Plantae
- Clade: Embryophytes
- Clade: Tracheophytes
- Clade: Spermatophytes
- Clade: Angiosperms
- Clade: Eudicots
- Clade: Rosids
- Order: Malpighiales
- Family: Achariaceae
- Genus: Poggea; Gürke

Genus of flowering plant

Poggea is a genus of flowering plants belonging to the family Achariaceae.

Its native range is western Tropical Africa and it is found in Angola, Cabinda Province, Cameroon, Congo, Gabon and Zaïre.

The genus name of Poggea is in honour of Paul Pogge (1838–1884), a German explorer in Africa. It was first described and published in Bot. Jahrb. Syst. Vol.18 on page 162 in 1893.

== Known species ==
According to Kew:

- Poggea alata Gürke
- Poggea gossweileri Exell
- Poggea longepedunculata Bamps
