= Gajki, Pomeranian Voivodeship =

Gajki
- Settlement
- Location within Poland
- Coordinates: 54°28′31″N 16°52′28″E
- Country: Poland
- Voivodeship: Pomeranian
- County: Słupsk
- Gmina: Słupsk
- Elevation: 43 m (141 ft)
- Population: 12

Gajki [ˈɡai̯ki] is a settlement in the administrative district of Gmina Słupsk, within Słupsk County, Pomeranian Voivodeship, in northern Poland.

For the history of the region, see History of Pomerania.
