= Głobino =

- Village
- Location within Poland
- Coordinates: 54°26′25″N 17°6′16″E
- Country: Poland
- Voivodeship: Pomeranian
- County: Słupsk
- Gmina: Słupsk

Population
  - Total: 448
- Time zone: UTC+1 (CET)
  - Summer (DST): UTC+2 (CEST)
- Postal code: 76-200

Głobino [ɡwɔˈbinɔ] (German: Gumbin) is a village in the administrative district of Gmina Słupsk, within Słupsk County, Pomeranian Voivodeship, in northern Poland. It is located in the historic region of Pomerania.

Around 1784, the village comprised a small farm estate, three farms, a watermill and all together 14 households.
