= Swochowo, Pomeranian Voivodeship =

Swochowo
- Village
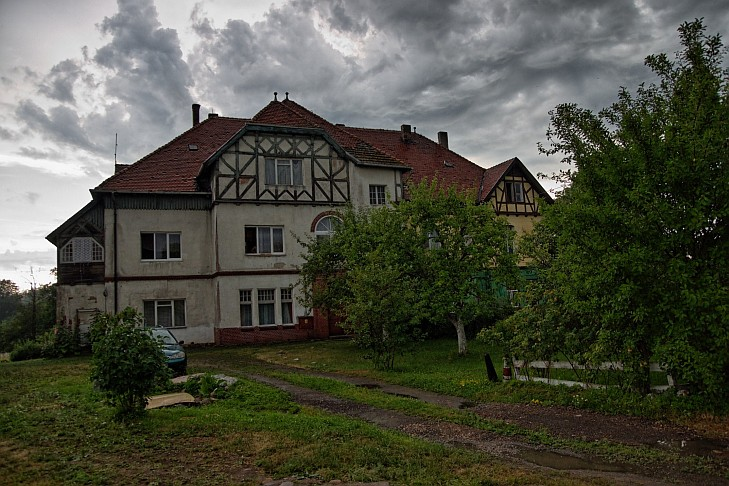
- Swochowo - manor house, currently house No. 3, XVIII, XIX

- Location within Poland
- Coordinates: 54°31′02″N 17°03′20″E
- Country: Poland
- Voivodeship: Pomeranian
- County: Słupsk
- Gmina: Słupsk
- Population: 106

Swochowo [sfɔˈxɔvɔ] is a village in the administrative district of Gmina Słupsk, within Słupsk County, Pomeranian Voivodeship, in northern Poland.

For the history of the region, see History of Pomerania.
