= Włynkowo =

- Village
- Location within Poland
- Coordinates: 54°31′N 17°0′E
- Country: Poland
- Voivodeship: Pomeranian
- County: Słupsk
- Gmina: Słupsk
- Population: 400

Włynkowo [vwɨnˈkɔvɔ] (German: Flinkow) is a village in the administrative district of Gmina Słupsk, within Słupsk County, Pomeranian Voivodeship, in northern Poland.

For the history of the region, see History of Pomerania.
