= Paul Pogge =

German explorer in Africa

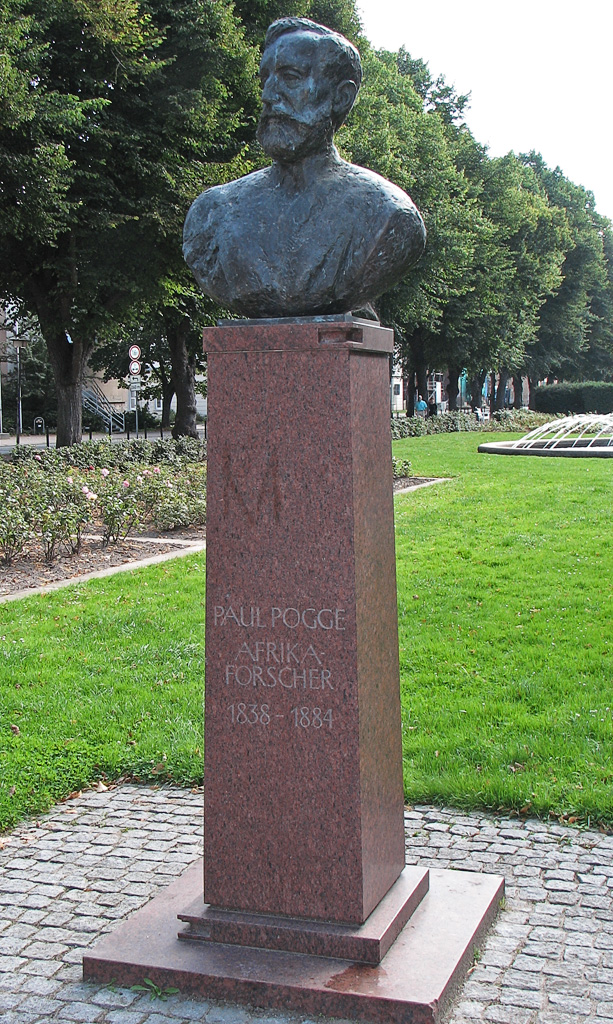
Paul Pogge

Paul Friedrich Johann Moritz Pogge (24 December 1838 – 16 March 1884) was a German explorer in the African continent.

Pogge was born in Groß Roge, Mecklenburg-Schwerin. He studied law in Berlin, Munich and Heidelberg, where he obtained his doctorate. In 1865/66, he took his first journey to South Africa (Cape Colony, Natal) as a big game hunter.

He undertook two expeditions in Central Africa into the southern Congo Basin, the first between 1874 and 1876 and the second between 1880 and 1884. On the first expedition he was accompanied by naturalist Alexander von Homeyer, and funded by the Deutschen Gesellschaft zur Erforschung Aequatorial-Afrikas. On his second journey he was accompanied by Hermann Wissmann, a trip in which the two explorers reached the site of Nyangwe on the Lualaba River. On the expedition they became the first Europeans to come in contact with members of the Batwa.

He died in Luanda.

In 1894, botanist Robert Louis August Maximilian Gürke published Poggea, a genus of flowering plants belonging to the family Achariaceae and named after Paul Pogge.

== Publications associated with Pogge ==
- Im reiche des Muata Jamwo. Tagebuch meiner im auftrage der Deustsche gesellschaft zur erforschung aequatorial-Afrika's in die Lunda-staaten unternommenen reise, 1880 - In the realm of the Muata Jamwo; diary on travels in the Luanda states.
- Pogge and Wissmann's route from the Kasai to Nyangwe, 1881-2 : from Lieut. Wissmann's original sketches. Royal Geographical Society, 1883.
- Durchquerung Afrikas T. 1. Unter deutscher Flagge quer durch Afrika von West nach Ost : Von 1880-1883 / ausgef. von Paul Pogge; Hermann von Wissmann, Berlin Globus Verlag, 1922 - Across Africa, volume 1. Under the German flag across Africa from west to east.
