= Siemianice, Pomeranian Voivodeship =

Siemianice
- Village
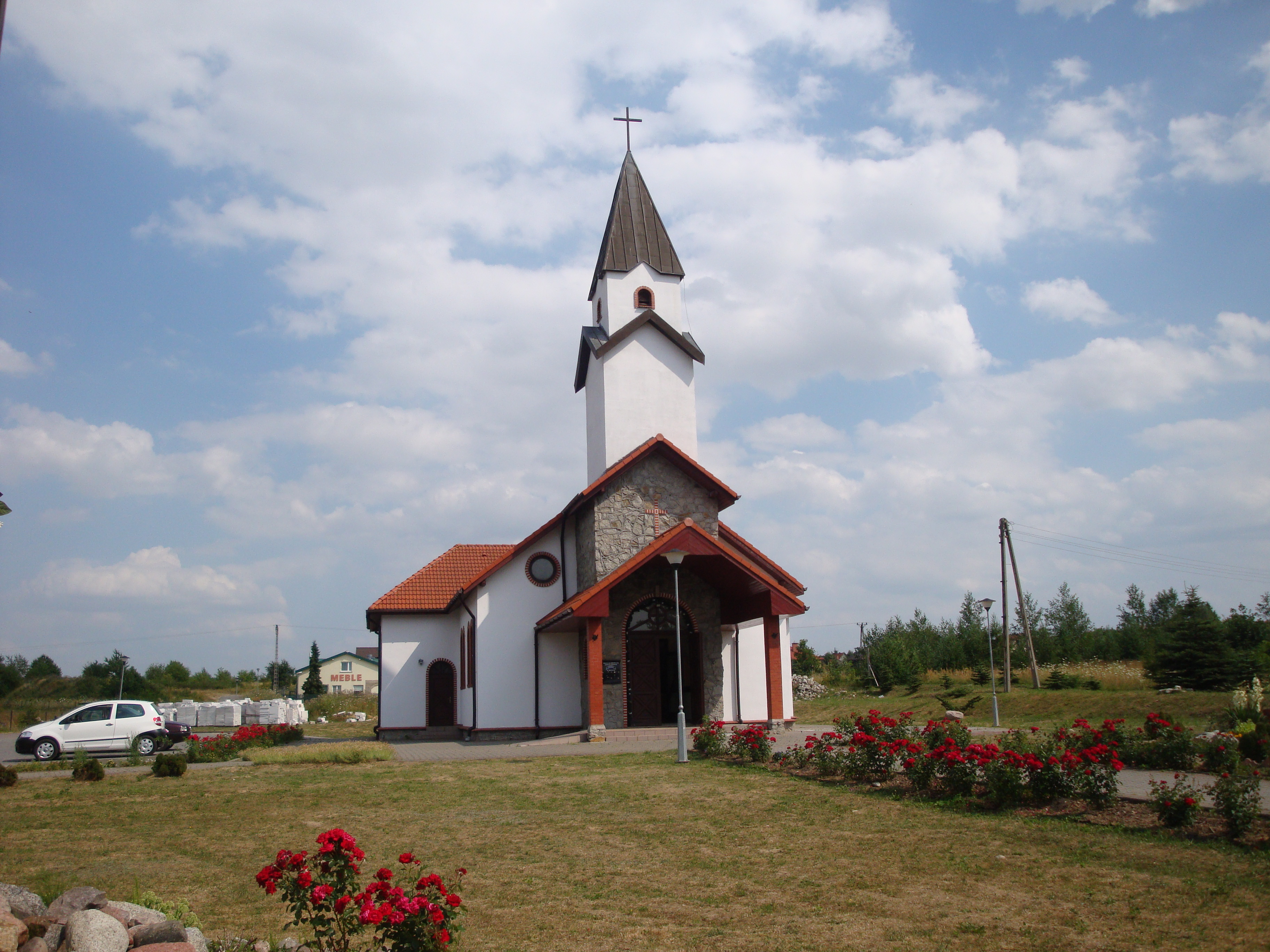
- Church in Siemianice

- Location within Poland
- Coordinates: 54°30′1″N 17°3′31″E
- Country: Poland
- Voivodeship: Pomeranian
- County: Słupsk
- Gmina: Słupsk
- First mentioned: 1315
- Elevation: 78 m (256 ft)

Population
  - Total: approximately 2,000
- Time zone: UTC+1 (CET)
  - Summer (DST): UTC+2 (CEST)
- Postal code: 76-200
- Website: http://www.slupsk.ug.gov.pl/test/siemianice.htm

Siemianice [ɕɛmjaˈnit͡sɛ] (German: Schmaatz) is a village in the administrative district of Gmina Słupsk, within Słupsk County, Pomeranian Voivodeship, in northern Poland.

The name of the village is of Slavic origin, and comes from the male name Siemian or Szymon. The earliest known reference to the village comes from 1315, when it was granted as a hereditary fief to the Swienca family. Later, the village belonged to the city of Słupsk.
