= Karżcino =

- Village
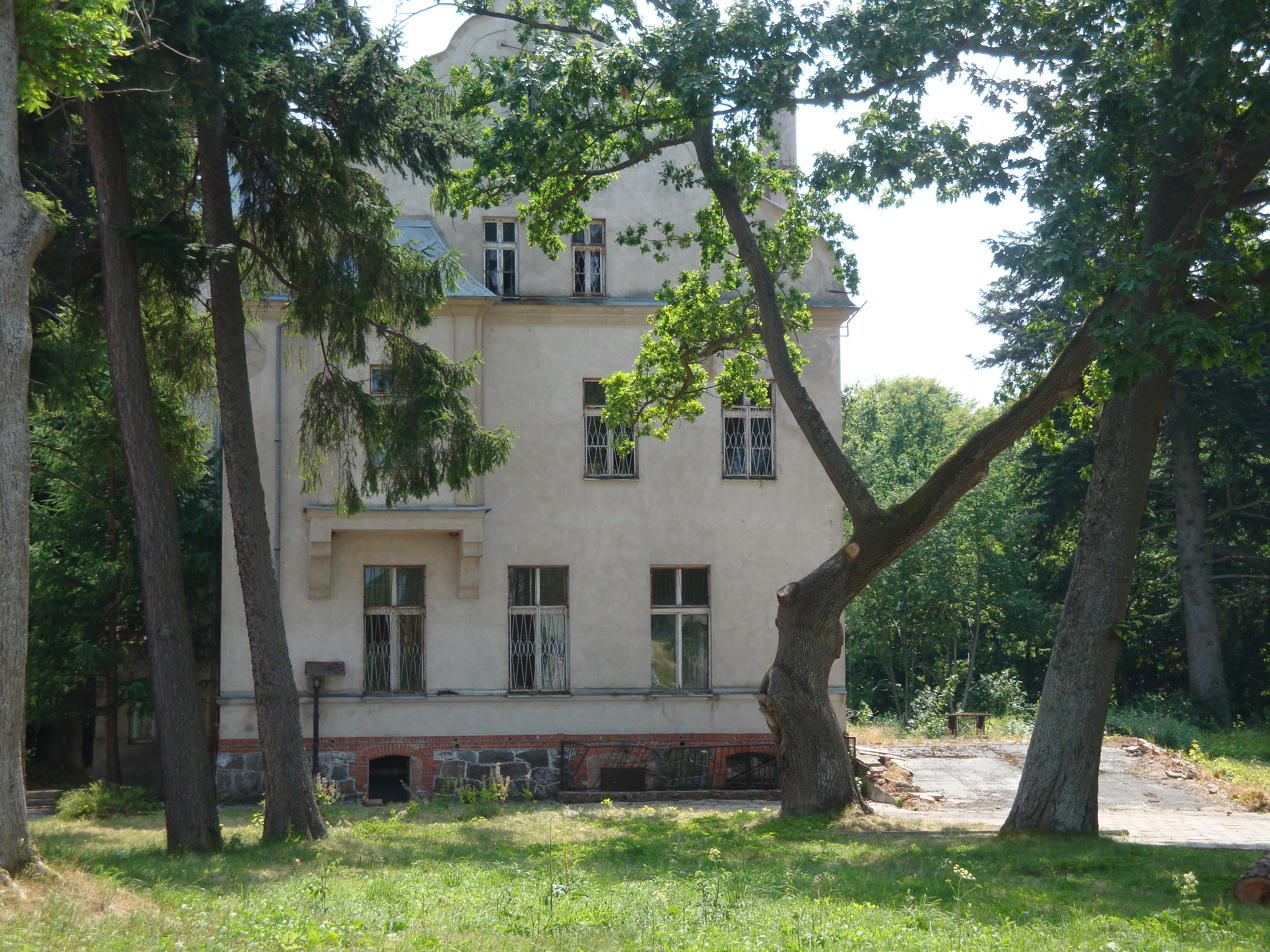
- Palace in Karżcino

- Location within Poland
- Coordinates: 54°33′13″N 17°4′4″E
- Country: Poland
- Voivodeship: Pomeranian
- County: Słupsk
- Gmina: Słupsk
- Population: 210

Karżcino [karʂˈt͡ɕinɔ] (German: Karzin) is a village in the administrative district of Gmina Słupsk, within Słupsk County, Pomeranian Voivodeship, in northern Poland.

For the history of the region, see History of Pomerania.
