= Łękwica =

- Village
- Location within Poland
- Coordinates: 54°34′34″N 17°8′37″E
- Country: Poland
- Voivodeship: Pomeranian
- County: Słupsk
- Gmina: Słupsk
- Population: 60

Łękwica [wɛnkˈfit͡sa] (German: Lankwitz) is a village in the administrative district of Gmina Słupsk, within Słupsk County, Pomeranian Voivodeship, in northern Poland.

For the history of the region, see History of Pomerania.
