= Kępno, Pomeranian Voivodeship =

Kępno
- Village
- Location within Poland
- Coordinates: 54°33′36″N 17°06′10″E
- Country: Poland
- Voivodeship: Pomeranian
- County: Słupsk
- Gmina: Słupsk
- Population: 14

Kępno [ˈkɛmpnɔ] is a village in the administrative district of Gmina Słupsk, within Słupsk County, Pomeranian Voivodeship, in northern Poland.

For the history of the region, see History of Pomerania.
