= Warblewo, Pomeranian Voivodeship =

Warblewo
- Village
- Location within Poland
- Coordinates: 54°25′44″N 17°10′46″E
- Country: Poland
- Voivodeship: Pomeranian
- County: Słupsk
- Gmina: Słupsk
- Population: 267

Warblewo [varˈblɛvɔ] (German: Warbelow) is a village in the administrative district of Gmina Słupsk, within Słupsk County, Pomeranian Voivodeship, in northern Poland.
