= Gać, Gmina Słupsk =

Village in Poland

Gać
- Village
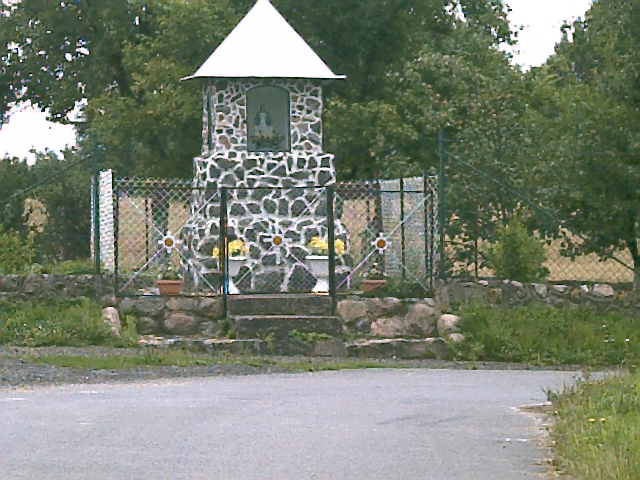
- Wayside shrine in c. 2005

- Location within Poland
- Coordinates: 54°27′30″N 16°51′17″E
- Country: Poland
- Voivodeship: Pomeranian
- County: Słupsk
- Gmina: Słupsk

Population
  - Total: 149
- Time zone: UTC+1 (CET)
  - Summer (DST): UTC+2 (CEST)
- Postal code: 76-200
- Vehicle registration: GSL

Gać (Polish pronunciation: [ɡat͡ɕ]; Kashubian: Gac; German: Gatz) is a village in the administrative district of Gmina Słupsk, within Słupsk County, Pomeranian Voivodeship, in northern Poland.
