= Rogawica =

- Village
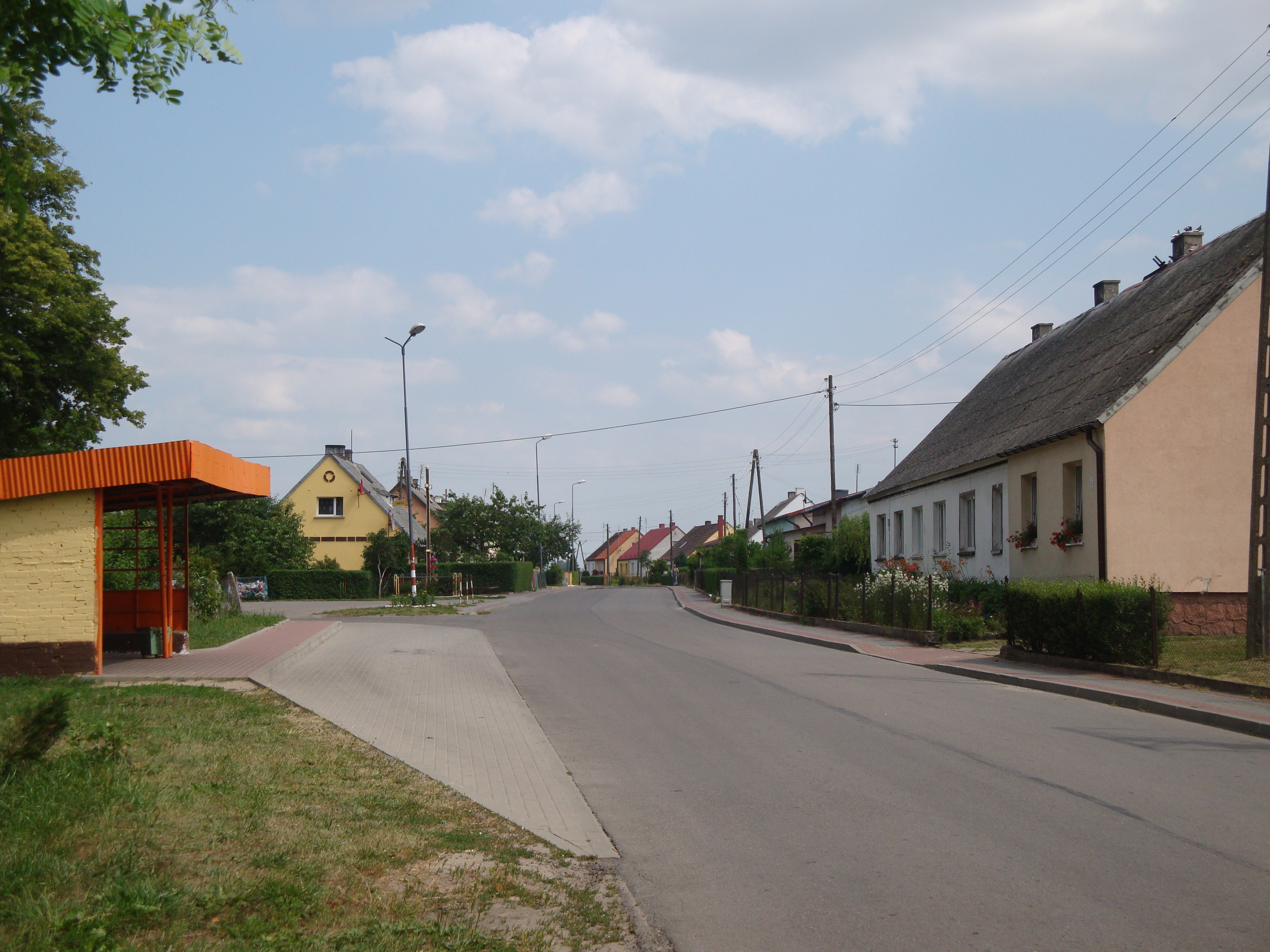

- Location within Poland
- Coordinates: 54°31′2″N 17°9′50″E
- Country: Poland
- Voivodeship: Pomeranian
- County: Słupsk
- Gmina: Słupsk
- Population: 262
- Postal code: 76-200

Rogawica [rɔɡaˈvit͡sa] (German: Roggatz) is a village in the administrative district of Gmina Słupsk, within Słupsk County, Pomeranian Voivodeship, in northern Poland.
