= Strzelino =

- Village
- Location within Poland
- Coordinates: 54°30′N 16°57′E
- Country: Poland
- Voivodeship: Pomeranian
- County: Słupsk
- Gmina: Słupsk
- Population: 478

Strzelino [stʂɛˈlinɔ] (German: Groß Strellin) is a village in the administrative district of Gmina Słupsk, within Słupsk County, Pomeranian Voivodeship, in northern Poland.
