= Bruskowo Wielkie =

- Village
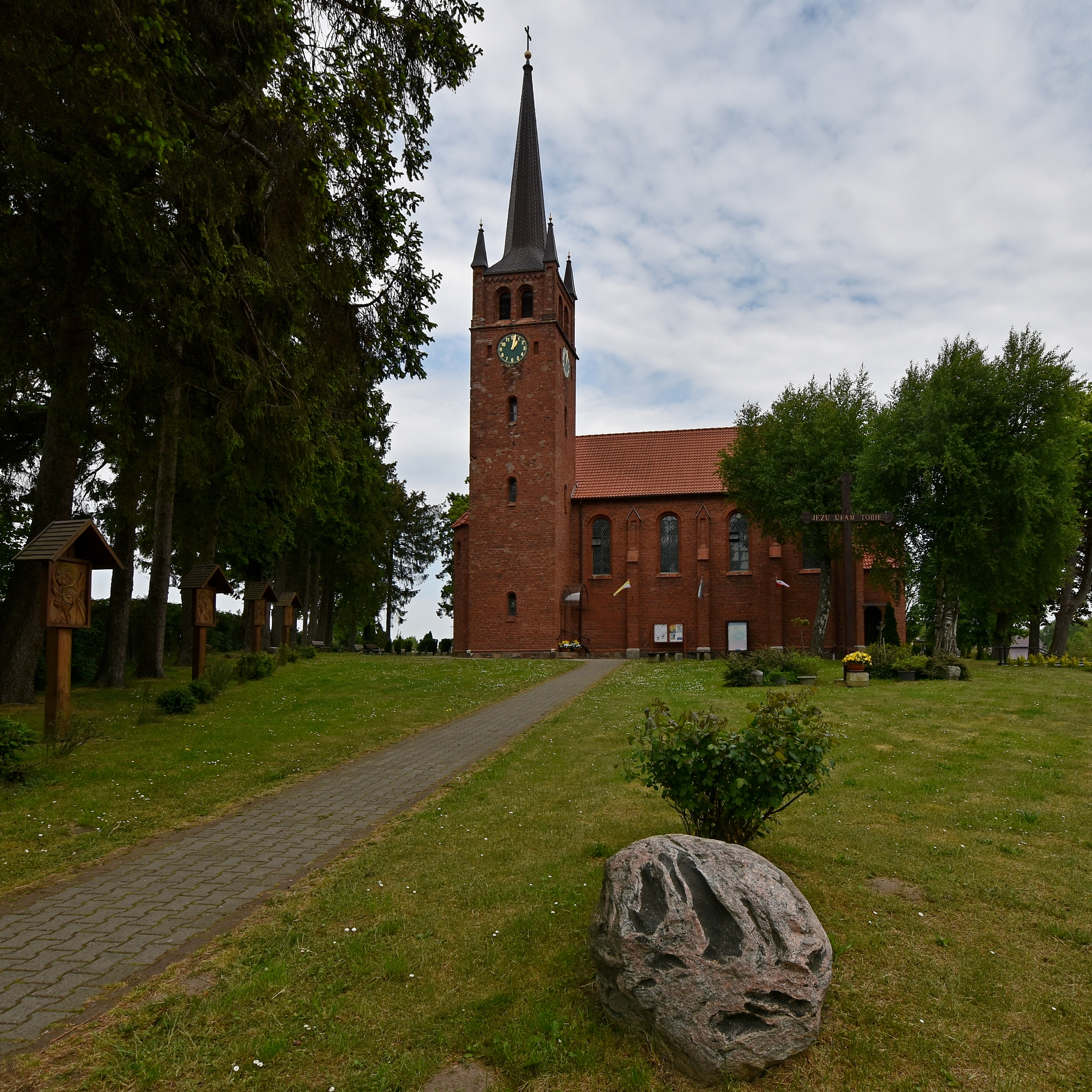
- Immaculate Conception church in Bruskowo Wielkie

- Location within Poland
- Coordinates: 54°29′39″N 16°54′34″E
- Country: Poland
- Voivodeship: Pomeranian
- County: Słupsk
- Gmina: Słupsk

Population
  - Total: 369
- Time zone: UTC+1 (CET)
  - Summer (DST): UTC+2 (CEST)
- Postal code: 76-200
- Vehicle registration: GSL

Bruskowo Wielkie [brusˈkɔvɔ ˈvjɛlkʲɛ] (German: Groß Brüskow) is a village in the administrative district of Gmina Słupsk, within Słupsk County, Pomeranian Voivodeship, in northern Poland. It is located in the historic region of Pomerania.

The village was also known in Polish as Brzoskowo in the past. In the 18th century the town was a manor farm which belonged to the rural district around the town of Słupsk, called Amt Stolp. In 1939 the village had 88 agricultural holdings.

On the area of the community, there is at 54°30'5"N 16°53'28"E the static inverter plant of SwePol HVDC.
