= Redęcin =

- Village
- Location within Poland
- Coordinates: 54°27′23″N 16°52′57″E
- Country: Poland
- Voivodeship: Pomeranian
- County: Słupsk
- Gmina: Słupsk

Population
  - Total: 217
- Time zone: UTC+1 (CET)
  - Summer (DST): UTC+2 (CEST)
- Vehicle registration: GSL

Redęcin [rɛˈdɛnt͡ɕin] (German: Reddentin) is a village in the administrative district of Gmina Słupsk, within Słupsk County, Pomeranian Voivodeship, in northern Poland. It is located in the historic region of Pomerania.

== History ==
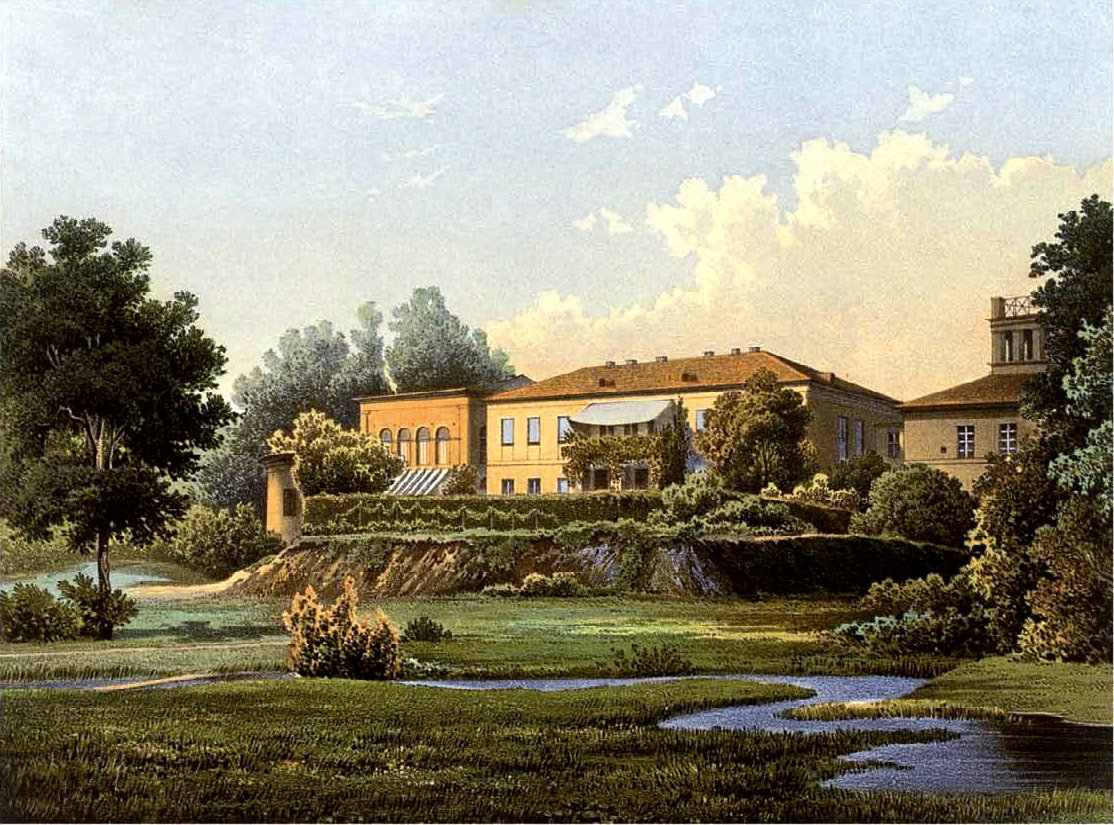
Palace Reddentin, edition Duncker

The area became part of the emerging Polish state in the 10th century. In 1307, the area was invaded and annexed from Poland by the Margraviate of Brandenburg, then it passed to the Duchy of Pomerania in 1317, and from 1368 it formed part of the Duchy of Słupsk, a vassal duchy of the Kingdom of Poland. From the 18th century it was part of the Kingdom of Prussia, and from 1871 it was also part of Germany. Following Germany's defeat in World War II in 1945, the area became again part of Poland.

== People ==
- Nikolaus von Below (1648-1707), Prussian general
