= Cecenowo railway station =

Railway station in Cecenowo, Poland

Coordinates: 54°38′27″N 17°32′21″E

Cecenowo

General information
- Location: Cecenowo; Poland
- Owner: Polskie Koleje Państwowe S.A.
- Platforms: None

Construction
- Structure type: Building: No; Depot: No; Water tower: No

History
- Former names: Zezenow
Location

Cecenowo is a non-operational PKP railway station in Cecenowo (Pomeranian Voivodeship), Poland.

== Lines crossing the station ==
Start station	End station	Line type
Słupsk	Cecenowo	Dismantled
