= Philipp Otto von Grumbkow =

Chancellor of the Province of Pomerania
- In office 1721–1747

Supreme president of the Province of Pomerania
- In office ?–1747

President of the General Directory of War and Finance
- In office 1723–1742
- Preceded by: office established
- Succeeded by: Georg Wilhelm von Aschersleben

Vice-chancellor of the Province of Pomerania
- In office 1720–1721

Personal details
- Born: 12 May 1684 Berlin, Margraviate of Brandenburg (now part of Germany)
- Died: 26 August 1752 (aged 68) Łupawa, Kingdom of Prussia (now part of Poland)
- Spouses: Ernestine Lucie Freiin von Danckelmann (1716–1719); Henrietta Scholastika von Schlabrendorff; Anna Augusta von Münchow
- Children: 4
- Parents: Joachim Ernst von Grumbkow; Gertrude Sophie von Grumbkow
- Education: Brandenburg University of Frankfurt
- Occupation: Military officer; Statesman

Military service
- Allegiance: Polish–Lithuanian Commonwealth (1697–1712); Kingdom of Prussia (1712–1750)
- Branch/service: Crown Army (1697–1712); Royal Prussian Army (1712–1750)
- Years of service: 1697–1750
- Rank: Colonel (Crown Army); Chief captain (Prussian Army)

Philipp Otto von Grumbkow (German: [ˈfɪlɪp ˈɔto fɔn ˈɡʁʊm.kɔf]; 12 May 1684 – 26 August 1752) was a statesman who served in the Province of Pomerania in the Kingdom of Prussia. He was the chancellor of the Province of Pomerania from 1721 to 1747, and the president of the General Directory of War and Finance from 1723 to 1742. He also served as the supreme president of the Province of Pomerania until 1747.

== Early life ==
Philipp Otto von Grumbkow was born on 12 May 1684 in Berlin, Margraviate of Brandenburg (now part of Germany). He came from Pomeranian noble family of Grumbkow. His father was Joachim Ernst von Grumbkow (1637–1690), who was a general and statesman. His mother was Gertrude Sophie von Grumbkow (1637–1690; née von Grote), a daughter of nobleman Otto von Grote.

He had three brothers: Friedrich Wilhelm von Grumbkow (1678–1739), Friedrich Ludwig von Grumbkow (1683–1745), and Karl Ernst von Grumbkow (died 1703). Friedrich Wilhelm was a field marshal general in the Royal Prussian Army, and Friedrich Ludwig was a lieutenant general in the Royal Saxon Army.

== Career ==
Philipp Otto von Grumbkow graduated from the Brandenburg University of Frankfurt in 1697. Following that, he enrolled in the Crown Army of the Polish–Lithuanian Commonwealth, where he reached the rank of colonel.

In 1712, he switched to the service in the Royal Prussian Army of the Kingdom of Prussia. In 1713, he became a member of the council of Province of Pomerania, which was seated in Stargard. The government's responsibilities were limited to legal, education, and church matters. He later received the title of the Geheimrat, which was the highest advising official title in Prussia. In 1718, he became chief captain of the Lauenburg and Bütow Land. In 1720, he became the vice-chancellor of the Province of Pomerania, and then chancellor in 1721. In 1723, he also became the first president of the newly formed General Directory of War and Finance. The same year, the seat of the provincial government and the general directory were moved from Stargard to Szczecin. Eventually, he became the supreme president of the Province of Pomerania. In 1773, he was awarded the Order of the Black Eagle by the king Frederick William I of Prussia.

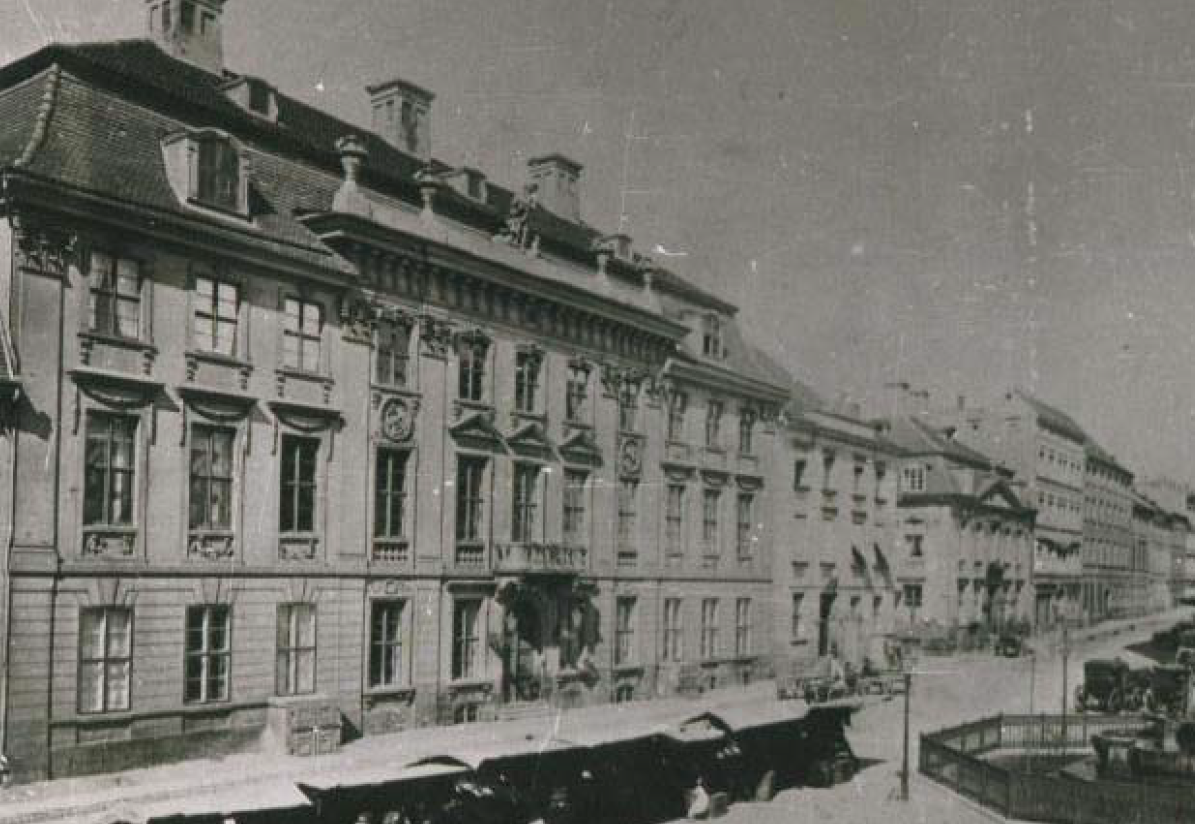
The Grumbkow Palace in Szczecin, in 1869, which was Philipp Otto von Grumbkow's residence.

In 1723, he commissioned the construction of the Grumbkow Palace in Szczecin, which would become his residence. The building was designed by Pierre du Montarques, and finished in 1726. The building was destroyed in 1890, and in its place was built the Globe Palace.

Grumbkow resigned from his position as president of the General Directory of War and Finance in 1742, and was succeeded by Georg Wilhelm von Aschersleben. In 1747, due to his advanced age, he was relieved from most of his remaining offices, including as the chancellor and supreme president of the Province of Pomerania. However, he retained the office of the chief captain of Lauenburg and Bütow Land until 1750. He was a member of the Freemasons from 1742.

He was an heir to the family estates of Darżewo, Łupawa, Runowo, Warcimino, and Żychlin. He died on 26 August 1752 in Łupawa, Kingdom of Prussia (now part of Poland).

== Private life ==
Philipp Otto von Grumbkow was married three times. His first marriage, beginning on 25 September 1716, was to Ernestine Lucie Freiin von Danckelmann (24 March 1692 – 29 December 1719), with whom he had two children, which were Charlotta Philippina von Grumbkow (23 December 1717 – 9 September 1741), and Ernestina Carolina Friederica von Grumbkow (23 December 1718 – 2 March 1799). His second marriage was with Henrietta Scholastika von Schlabrendorff. Together they had two children, which were Philipp Wilhelm von Grumbkow (23 June 1711 – 21 September 1778), and Marie Henriette von Grumbkow (23 June 1711 – 25 March 1762). His third marriage was with Anna Augusta von Münchow.

== Orders and decorations ==
- Order of the Black Eagle (1773)
