= Grumbkow =

Grumbkow may refer to:

- Christian and Joachim von Grumbkow, founders of progressive rock group Hoelderlin
- Clemens von Grumbkow (born 1983), a rugby union player
- Friedrich Wilhelm von Grumbkow (1678–1739), a military officer and politician
- Joachim Ernst von Grumbkow (1637–1690), a military officer and politician
- Philipp Otto von Grumbkow (1684–1752), a statesman and military officer

== See also ==
- Joachim von Grumbcow, cellist for Tangerine Dream
