= Nowe Skórowo =

- Village
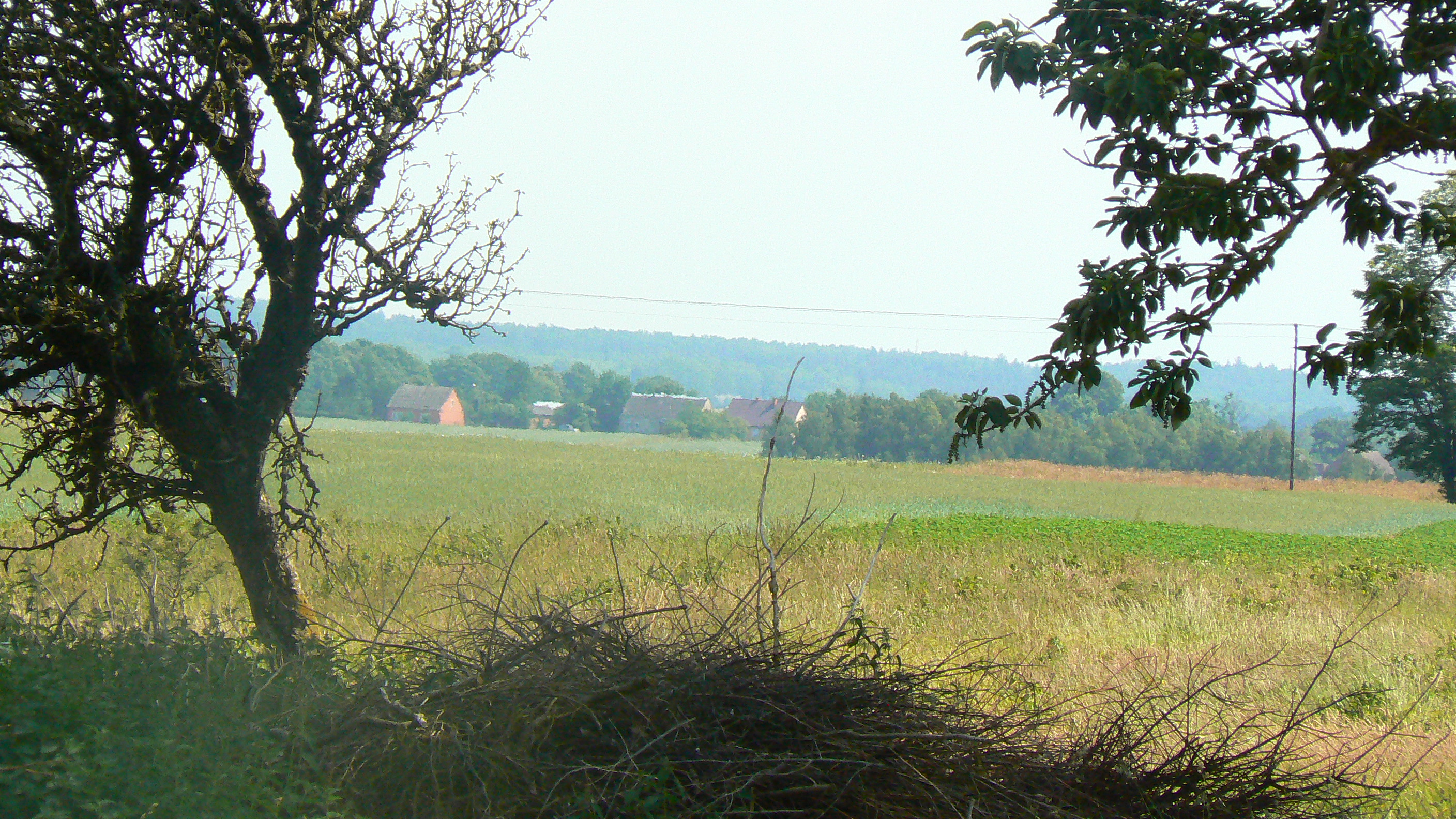

- Location within Poland
- Coordinates: 54°29′46″N 17°31′52″E
- Country: Poland
- Voivodeship: Pomeranian
- County: Słupsk
- Gmina: Potęgowo

Population
  - Total: 142
- Time zone: UTC+1 (CET)
  - Summer (DST): UTC+2 (CEST)
- Vehicle registration: GSL

Nowe Skórowo [ˈnɔvɛ skuˈrɔvɔ] is a village in the administrative district of Gmina Potęgowo, within Słupsk County, Pomeranian Voivodeship, in northern Poland.

== History ==
The area became part of the emerging Polish state under its first historic ruler Mieszko I by c. 967. Following the fragmentation of Poland, at various times it formed part of the duchies of Eastern Pomerania, Western Pomerania and Słupsk. From the 18th century, it formed part of the Kingdom of Prussia, and from 1871 to 1945 it was also part of Germany. After Germany's defeat in World War II, it became again part of Poland.
