= Dabrowno =

Dabrowno may refer to the following places in Poland:

- Dąbrówno, Warmian-Masurian Voivodeship
- Dąbrówno, Pomeranian Voivodeship
- Dąbrowno, Lubusz Voivodeship
- Dąbrowno, Silesian Voivodeship
