= Wykosowo railway station =

Railway station in Wykosowo, Poland

Wykosowo

General information
- Location: Wykosowo; Poland
- Coordinates: 54°36′N 17°24′E
- Owner: Polskie Koleje Państwowe S.A.
- Platforms: None

Construction
- Structure type: Building: No; Depot: No; Water tower: No

History
- Former names: Vixow
Location

Wykosowo is a non-operational PKP railway station in Wykosowo (Pomeranian Voivodeship), Poland.

== Lines crossing the station ==
Start station	End station	Line type
Słupsk	Cecenowo	Dismantled
