= Rębowo, Pomeranian Voivodeship =

Rębowo
- Village
- Location within Poland
- Coordinates: 54°27′32″N 17°22′3″E
- Country: Poland
- Voivodeship: Pomeranian
- County: Słupsk
- Gmina: Potęgowo

Population
  - Total: 121
- Time zone: UTC+1 (CET)
  - Summer (DST): UTC+2 (CEST)
- Vehicle registration: GSL

Rębowo [rɛmˈbɔvɔ] is a village in the administrative district of Gmina Potęgowo, within Słupsk County, Pomeranian Voivodeship, in northern Poland.

== Etymology ==
The name of the village comes either from the Polish word rąb ("chop") or from the Old Polish male name Ręb.

== History ==
Early Bronze Age axes were found in the village. The territory became part of the emerging Polish state under its first ruler Mieszko I by c. 967. Following the fragmentation of Poland into smaller duchies, it formed part of the Duchy of Pomerania until 1637. From 1648, it was part of Prussia and from 1871 to 1945 also of unified Germany.
