= Potęgowo, Słupsk County =

Potęgowo
- Village
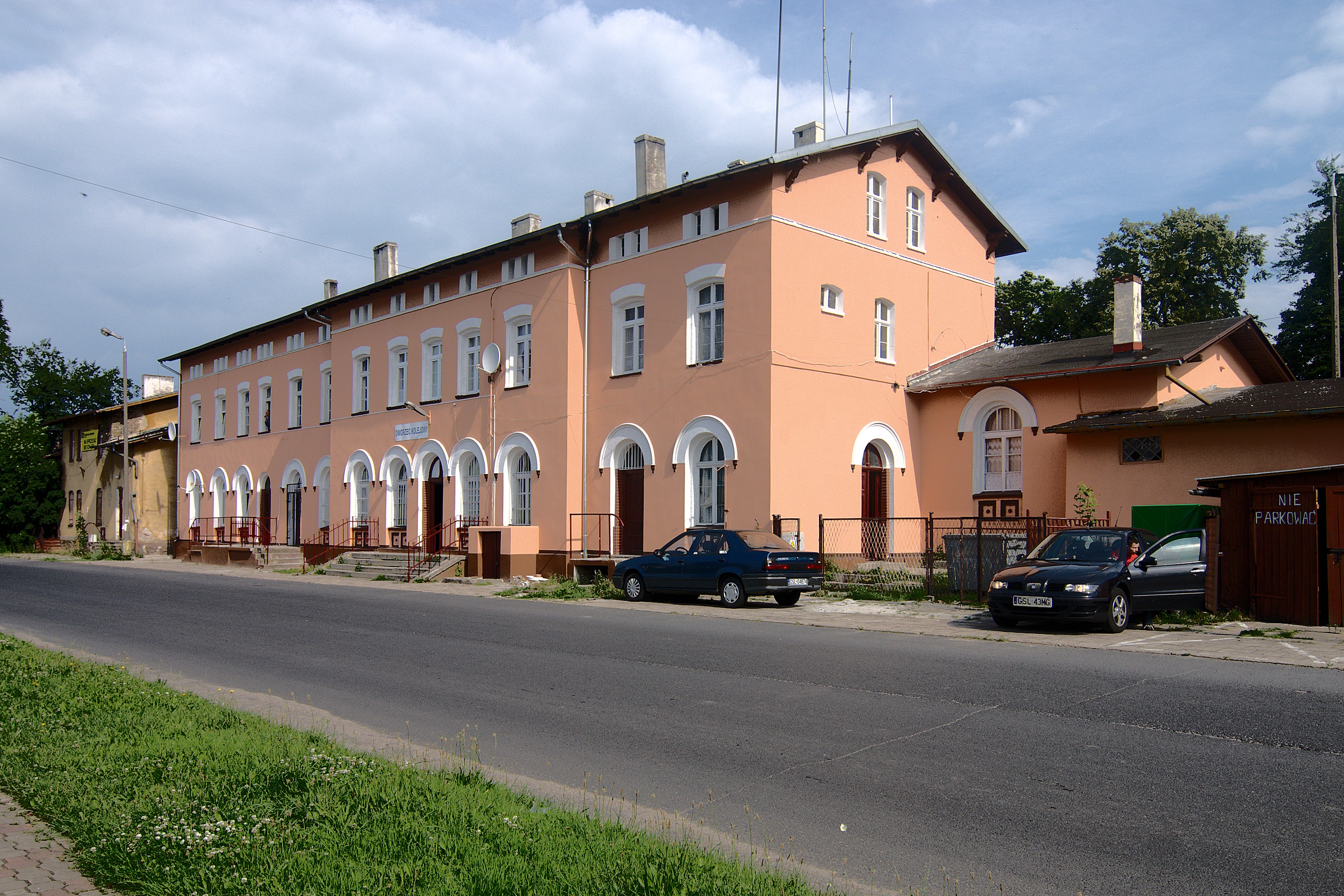
- Train station

- Location within Poland
- Coordinates: 54°29′1″N 17°29′3″E
- Country: Poland
- Voivodeship: Pomeranian
- County: Słupsk
- Gmina: Potęgowo

Population
  - Total: 1,416

Potęgowo [pɔtɛnˈɡɔvɔ] (German: Pottangow) is a village in Słupsk County, Pomeranian Voivodeship, in northern Poland. It is the seat of the gmina (administrative district) called Gmina Potęgowo.
