= General War Commissariat =

Following the defeats Prussia suffered in the 30 Years' War, Frederick William, Elector of Brandenburg, set up the General War Commissariat (General-Kriegs-Kommissariat) to oversee the army, as well as to levy taxes necessary to support the army. It soon became a bureaucratic machine for civil government as well. Frederick William used it to govern the state. Many members were landed aristocracy known as Junkers, who served in the army as well. The commissariats helped to centralize power. It later was merged into General Directory of War and Finance in 1723. Joachim Friedrich von Blumenthal was its first head since 1646. During the reign of Frederick William I, Friedrich Wilhelm von Grumbkow became its head.
