= Huta, Słupsk County =

Huta
- Settlement
- Location within Poland
- Coordinates: 54°28′16″N 17°25′2″E
- Country: Poland
- Voivodeship: Pomeranian
- County: Słupsk
- Gmina: Potęgowo
- Time zone: UTC+1 (CET)
  - Summer (DST): UTC+2 (CEST)
- Vehicle registration: GSL

Huta [ˈxuta] is a settlement in the administrative district of Gmina Potęgowo, within Słupsk County, Pomeranian Voivodeship, in northern Poland.

== History ==
In the 10th century, the area became part of the emerging Polish state under its first historic ruler Mieszko I. Following the fragmentation of Poland into smaller duchies, it became part of the Duchy of Pomerania. From 1701, it was part of the Kingdom of Prussia, and from 1871 to 1945 it was also part of Germany. Following Germany's defeat in World War II, in 1945, it became again part of Poland.

== Transport ==
The Polish National road 6 runs nearby, south of the settlement.
