= Głuszyno =

- Village
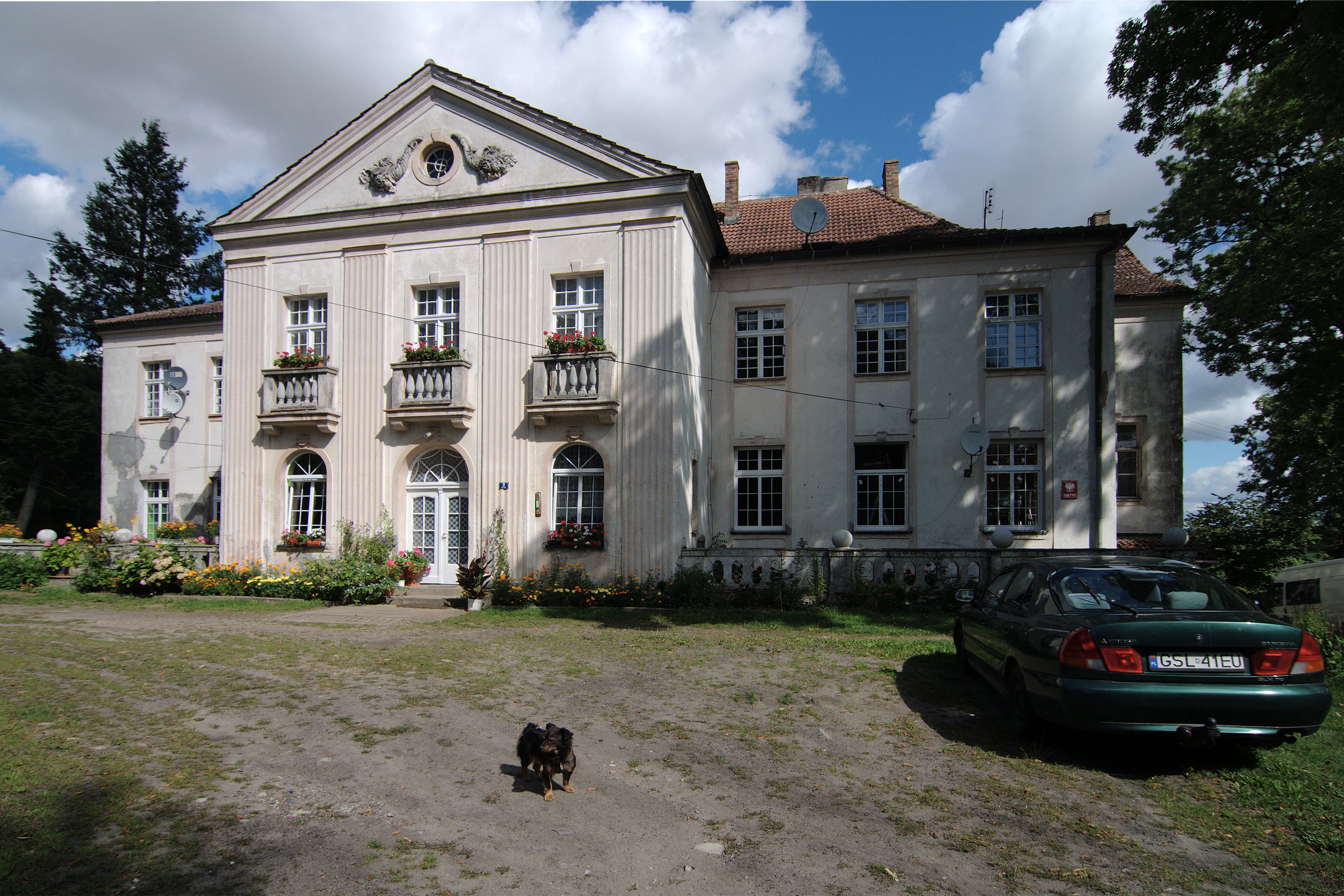
- Palace in Głuszyno

- Location within Poland
- Coordinates: 54°29′43″N 17°25′18″E
- Country: Poland
- Voivodeship: Pomeranian
- County: Słupsk
- Gmina: Potęgowo

Population
  - Total: 272

Głuszyno [ɡwuˈʂɨnɔ] (German: Groß Gluschen) is a village in the administrative district of Gmina Potęgowo, within Słupsk County, Pomeranian Voivodeship, in northern Poland.

Before 1648 the area was part of Duchy of Pomerania, 1648-1945 Prussia and Germany. For the history of the region, see History of Pomerania.
