= Gmina Potęgowo =

Gmina Potęgowo Potęgowo Commune
- Gmina
- Flag Coat of arms
- Interactive map of Gmina Potęgowo
- Coordinates (Potęgowo): 54°29′1″N 17°29′3″E
- Country: Poland
- Voivodeship: Pomeranian
- County: Słupsk County
- Seat: Potęgowo

Area
  - Total: 227.92 km^{2} (88.00 sq mi)

Population (2006)
  - Total: 7,147
  - Density: 31.36/km^{2} (81.22/sq mi)
- Website: https://www.potegowo.pl

Gmina Potęgowo is a rural gmina (administrative district) in Słupsk County, Pomeranian Voivodeship, in northern Poland. Its seat is the village of Potęgowo, which lies approximately 30 kilometres (19 mi) east of Słupsk and 76 km (47 mi) west of the regional capital Gdańsk.

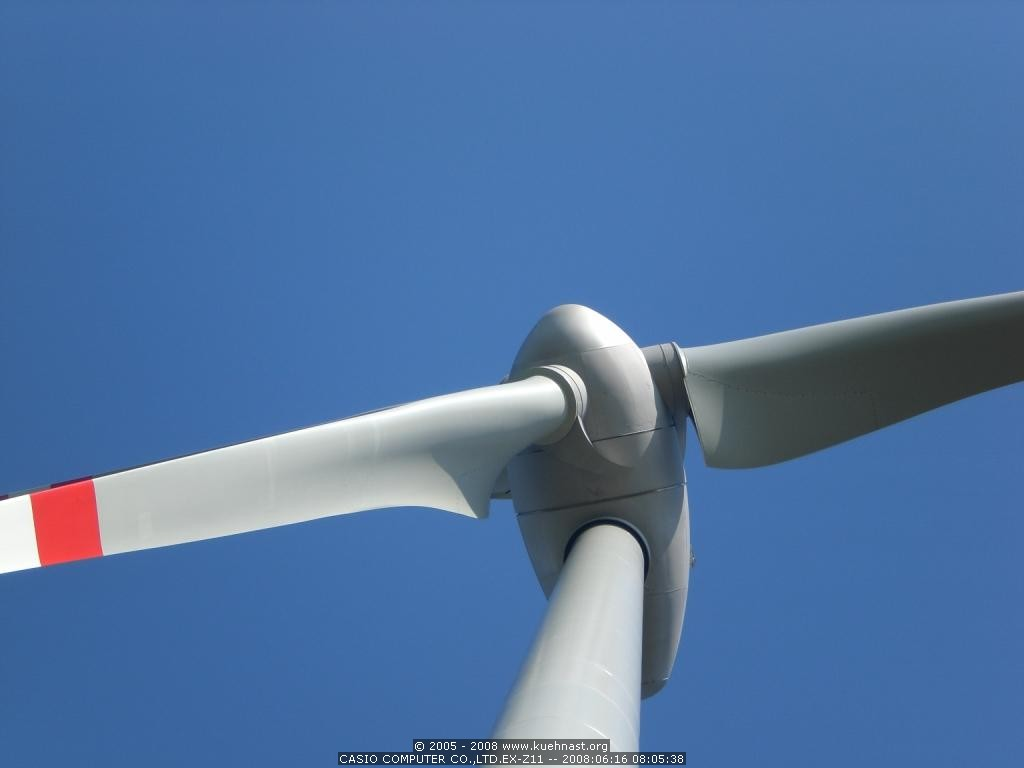

The gmina covers an area of 227.92 square kilometres (88.0 sq mi), and as of 2006 its total population is 7,147.

== Neighbouring gminas ==
Gmina Potęgowo is bordered by the gminas of Cewice, Czarna Dąbrówka, Damnica, Dębnica Kaszubska, Główczyce and Nowa Wieś Lęborska.

== Villages ==
Gmina Potęgowo includes the villages and settlements of Chlewnica, Czerwieniec, Dąbrówno, Darżynko, Darżyno, Gaje, Głuszynko, Głuszyno, Grąbkowo, Grapice, Grapiczki, Huta, Karznica, Łupawa, Malczkówko, Malczkowo, Nieckowo, Nowa Dąbrowa, Nowe Skórowo, Nowina, Piaseczno, Poganice, Potęgowo, Radosław, Rębowo, Runowo, Rzechcinko, Rzechcino, Skórowo, Warcimino, Węgierskie, Wieliszewo, Żochówko, Żochowo and Żychlin.
