= Chlewnica =

- Village
- Location within Poland
- Coordinates: 54°28′38″N 17°31′9″E
- Country: Poland
- Voivodeship: Pomeranian
- County: Słupsk
- Gmina: Potęgowo
- Population: 30

Chlewnica [xlɛvˈnit͡sa] is a village in the administrative district of Gmina Potęgowo, within Słupsk County, Pomeranian Voivodeship, in northern Poland.
