= Czerwieniec, Pomeranian Voivodeship =

Czerwieniec
- Village
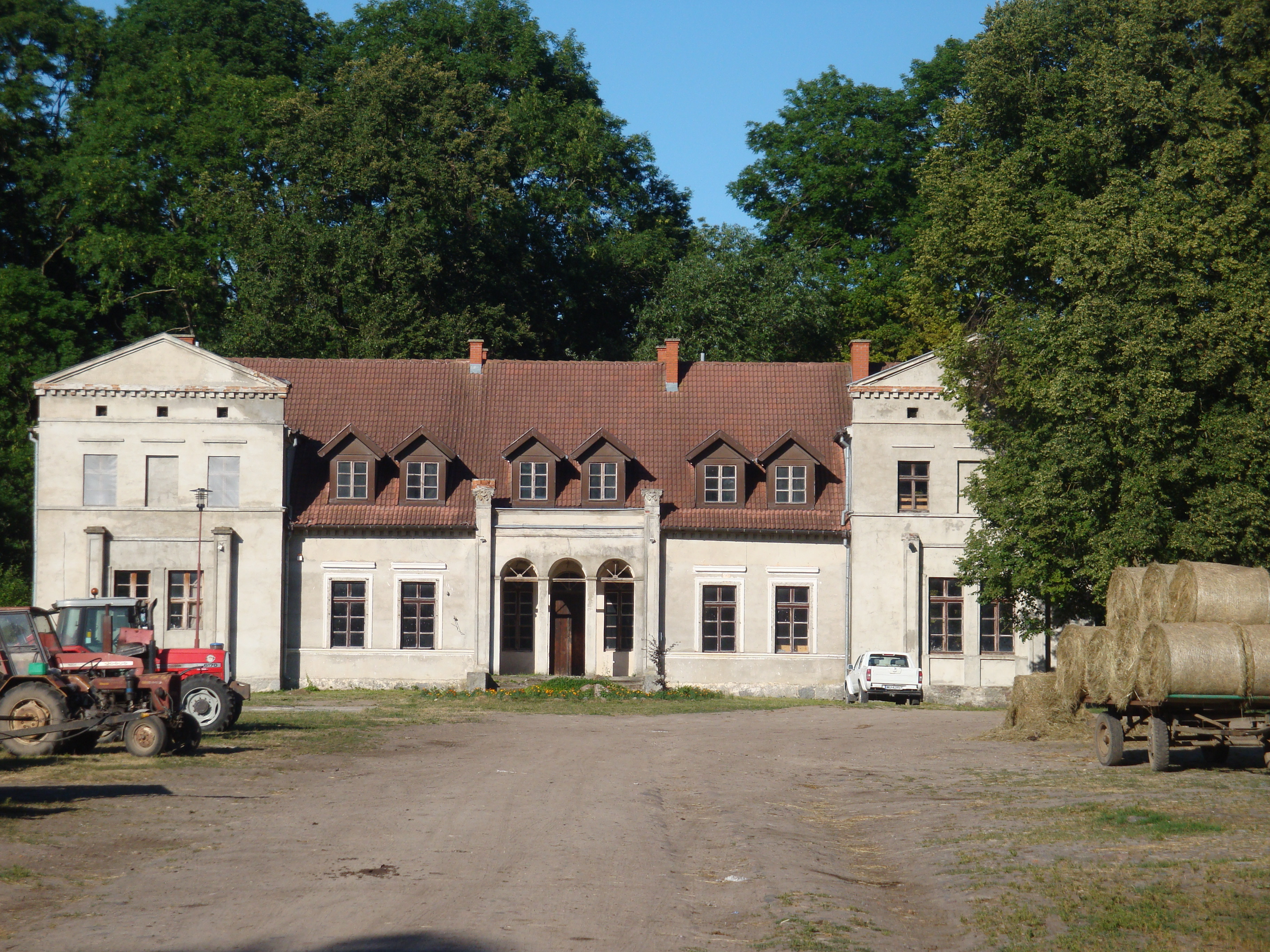
- Manor house in Czerwieniec

- Location within Poland
- Coordinates: 54°30′56″N 17°33′20″E
- Country: Poland
- Voivodeship: Pomeranian
- County: Słupsk
- Gmina: Potęgowo
- Population: 138

Czerwieniec [t͡ʂɛrˈvjɛɲɛt͡s] (German: Schierwens) is a village in the administrative district of Gmina Potęgowo, within Słupsk County, Pomeranian Voivodeship, in northern Poland.
