= Malczkowo =

- Village
- Location within Poland
- Coordinates: 54°25′19″N 17°22′51″E
- Country: Poland
- Voivodeship: Pomeranian
- County: Słupsk
- Gmina: Potęgowo
- Population: 504

Malczkowo [malt͡ʂˈkɔvɔ] (German: Malzkow) is a village in the administrative district of Gmina Potęgowo, within Słupsk County, Pomeranian Voivodeship, in northern Poland.

Before 1648 the area was part of Duchy of Pomerania, 1648-1945 Prussia and Germany. For the history of the region, see History of Pomerania.
