= Friedrich Wilhelm von Grumbkow =

Prussian marshal and statesman (1678–1739)

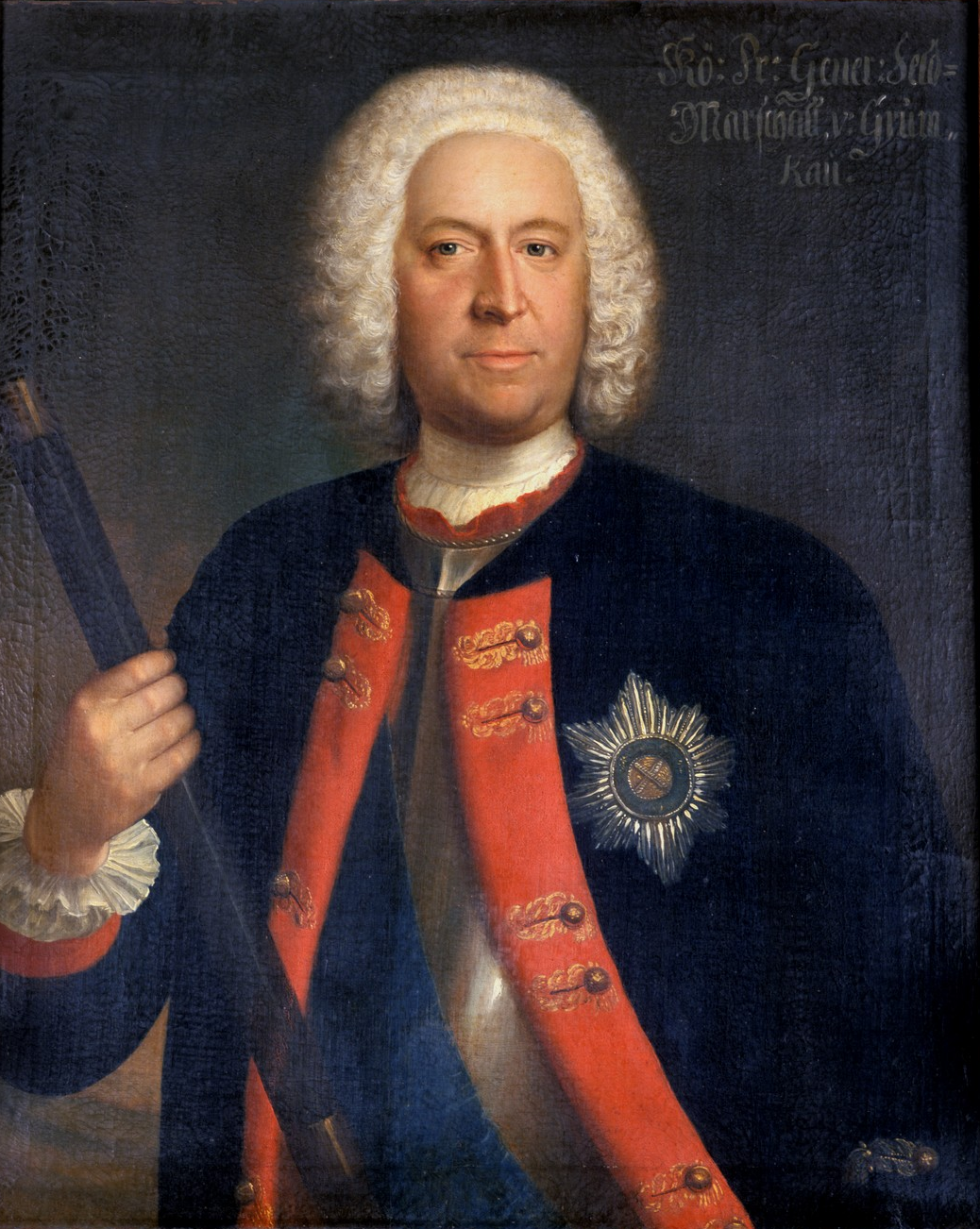
- Born: 4 October 1678; Berlin, Kingdom of Prussia
- Died: 18 March 1739 (aged 60); Berlin, Kingdom of Prussia
- Father: Joachim Ernst von Grumbkow

Friedrich Wilhelm von Grumbkow (4 October 1678 – 18 March 1739) was a Prussian Generalfeldmarschall and statesman.

The cultured Grumbkow was born in Berlin as the son of Joachim Ernst von Grumbkow, General War Minister of Brandenburg-Prussia. Educated in France, he married a Mademoiselle de la Chevalerie. He took part in the War of the Spanish Succession, fighting in the Battle of Malplaquet and reaching the rank of Generalmajor.

King Frederick William I of Prussia trusted Grumbkow and named him a member of the Privy Council and the head of the Generalkriegskommissariat, or General War Commissariat. He was known as "Biberius" to his friends, on account of his proclivity to alcohol consumption. He owned the Petit Palais in Niederschönhausen and a house on Königstraße in Berlin.

Grumbkow rose to the top of the Prussian military and taxation branches, allowing him to aid Frederick William in his efforts to modernize the administration of Prussia. His improvements to the taxation system were vital to the colonization of unsettled lands and to municipal governance. After the creation of the General Directory in 1723, Grumbkow became head of the first department. He was promoted to Generalfeldmarschall in 1737.

Influenced by the Imperial envoy in Berlin, Friedrich Heinrich von Seckendorff, Grumbkow advised Frederick William I against a marriage of Crown Prince Frederick with a princess from the House of Hanover. In serving the interests of Habsburg Austria over the House of Hohenzollern, Grumbkow deepened the divide between Frederick William and his son, Frederick.

Frederick William tolerated Grumbkow's being on the payroll of Austria. In a letter to Leopold I, Prince of Anhalt-Dessau, the king wrote of Grumbkow's corruption, "I know he is like that, but you need such people to do the business honourable people wouldn't want to soil their hands with. I get more out of him in an hour than I acquit with others in three."

Frederick eventually reached a reconciliation with both Frederick William and Grumbkow. He referred to Grumbkow as "the Cassubian", because of his Pomeranian ancestry. Grumbkow died in Berlin in 1739, barely over a year before Frederick William.
