= Łupawa =

- Village
- Location within Poland
- Coordinates: 54°25′7″N 17°24′51″E
- Country: Poland
- Voivodeship: Pomeranian
- County: Słupsk
- Gmina: Potęgowo
- Chartered: 1689

Population
  - Total: 730

Łupawa [wuˈpava] (German: Lupow) is a village in the administrative district of Gmina Potęgowo, within Słupsk County, Pomeranian Voivodeship, in northern Poland.

The settlement was first mentioned in 1282. From the 15th until the 18th century Łupawa enjoyed some importance as it was situated on the road from Szczecin to Gdańsk. In 1689 Łupawa was incorporated as a town.
