= Joachim Ernst von Grumbkow =

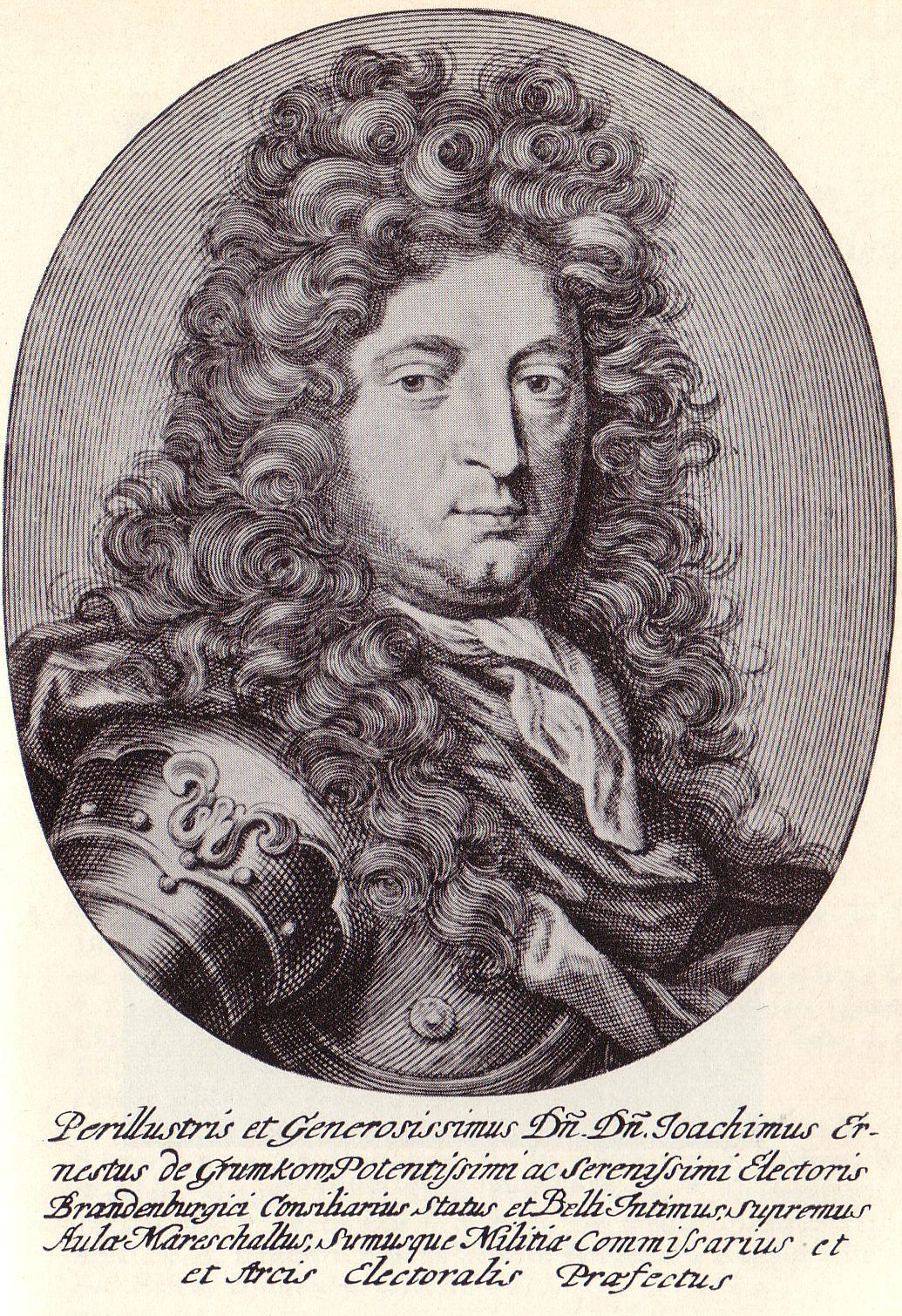
Joachim Ernst von Grumbkow.

Joachim Ernst von Grumbkow (1637 – 26 December 1690) was a general and statesman of Brandenburg-Prussia.

Grumbkow came from a family of Pomeranian nobility whose first mention was the brothers Bisbranus, Gneomarus and Tezlaus in 1277.

Grumbkow served in both the Brandenburg army and the civil administration of Frederick William, Elector of Brandenburg. A cavalry regiment he created and led in 1674 became the Dragoon Life Guards. Until 1918, the regiment was the 1. Schlesisches Leib-Kürassier-Regiment "Großer Kurfürst", based in Breslau.

Grumbkow became Generalkriegskommissar, or minister of war, in 1679, succeeding Claus Ernst von Platen. Under his direction, the position was greatly expanded and included the functions of a minister of war and minister of finance.

In early 1680, Grumbkow acquired the Petit Palais in Niederschönhausen from Countess Sophie Theodore zu Dohna-Schlobitten. He was entrusted with enacting the Edict of Potsdam, by which Huguenot refugees were encouraged to live in Brandenburg-Prussia. Grumbkow founded a French colony now known as Französisch Buchholz in Berlin-Pankow. The street Grumbkowstraße in Französisch Buchholz commemorates Grumbkow's actions.

Grumbkow led the contingent of Brandenburg troops who accompanied William of Orange to England in 1690, after which he died in Wesel.

He had four sons, which were: Friedrich Wilhelm von Grumbkow (1678–1739), Friedrich Ludwig von Grumbkow (1683–1745), Philipp Otto von Grumbkow (1684–1752), and Karl Ernst von Grumbkow (died 1703).
