= Dąbrówno, Pomeranian Voivodeship =

Dąbrówno
- Village
- Location within Poland
- Coordinates: 54°25′34″N 17°28′3″E
- Country: Poland
- Voivodeship: Pomeranian
- County: Słupsk
- Gmina: Potęgowo
- Population: 246

Dąbrówno [dɔmˈbruvnɔ] (German: Schöneichen) is a village in the administrative district of Gmina Potęgowo, within Słupsk County, Pomeranian Voivodeship, in northern Poland.

Before 1648 the area was part of Duchy of Pomerania, 1648-1945 Prussia and Germany. For the history of the region, see History of Pomerania.
