= General Directorate (Prussia) =

Government ministries in Prussia

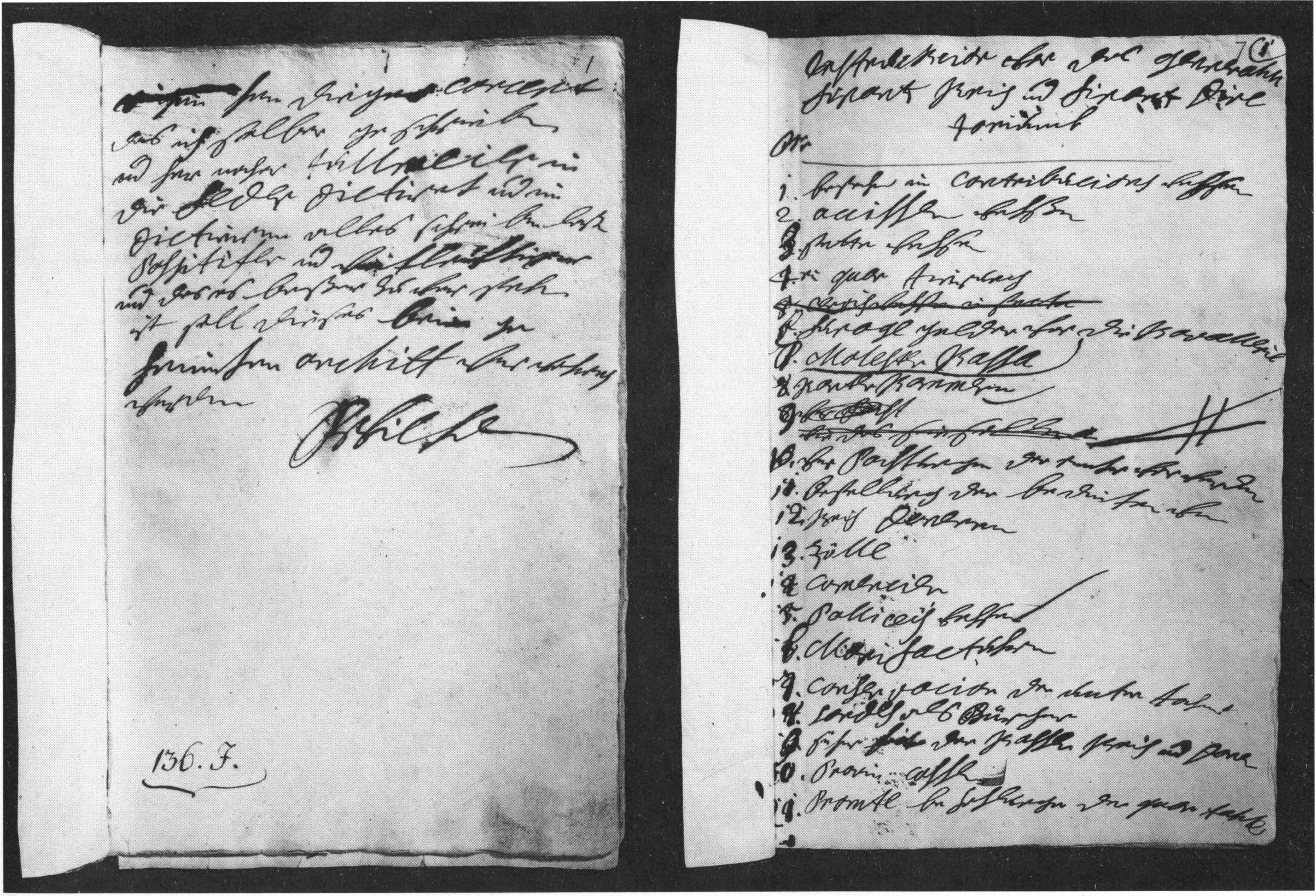
Handwritten instructions from King Frederick William I from 1722 for the General Directorate, Merseburg State Archives

The General Directorate (German: General-Ober-Finanz-Kriegs-und Domainen-Direktorium), was an administrative body of the Kingdom of Prussia for internal and financial administration that existed between 1723 and 1808. It was founded by King Frederick William I as a "registry". This led to the development of the Privy Ministerial Archives, which were merged with the Privy State Archives in 1874.

== History ==
The General Directorate was set up by King Frederick William I on December 20, 1722, to consolidate the departments established during his reign to replace the corrupt Cabinet of Three Counts and reorganize the finances that had been shattered by his father, King Frederick I. The Directorate connected the General Finance Directorate, founded in 1713, and the General War Commissariat, which had existed since 1660, (Note: Following Prussia's defeats in the 30 Years' War, Frederick William, Elector of Brandenburg, set up the General War Commissariat to oversee the army, as well as to levy taxes necessary to support the army although it soon became a bureaucratic machine for civil government of which its members were often landed aristocracy known as Junkers, who served in the army as well.) to form the General-Ober-Finanz-Kriegs-und Domainen-Direktorium. The new central authority was initially divided into four "departments", each of which was responsible for several territories of the entire state. The Directorate was responsible for financial, economic and domestic policy (with the exception of the judiciary and church). The war and domain chambers formed in the provinces and most of the special administrations were also subordinate to him.

Beginning with the reign of King Frederick II in 1740 onwards, a number of new departments were created which were divided into subject areas, namely for trade and manufacturing (in 1740), for military economics (in 1746), for excise and customs (in 1766), for mines and smelters (in 1768) and for forests (in 1770). Since the provincial departments remained in place, a complex juxtaposition of responsibilities emerged. At the head of each department was a "Directing Minister". It was also notable that Frederick did not place the "Sovereign Duchy" of Silesia, which he defeated in 1741/63 (annexed under the Treaty of Berlin in 1742 and the Treaty of Hubertusburg in 1763), under the jurisdiction of the General Directorate, but rather to a provincial minister who reported directly to him.

Under Frederick's successors, the shortcomings of this organization were recognized, but only partially corrected. It was only in the course of the Stein-Hardenberg Reforms that the General Directorate was abolished in 1808 and its tasks were transferred to the modern State Ministry, in which the distribution of departments was divided solely according to subject areas.

== See also ==
- Prussian State Ministry
