= Duchy of Pomerania-Stolp =

Duchy in Farther Pomerania (1368–1478)

Coordinates: 54°27′00″N 17°02′00″E

Duchy of Pomerania-Stolp (Słupsk) (Teil-)Herzogtum Pommern-Stolp (German) Księstwo Słupskie (Polish) Ducatus Stolpensis (Latin)
- 1368–1478
- Banner Coat of arms

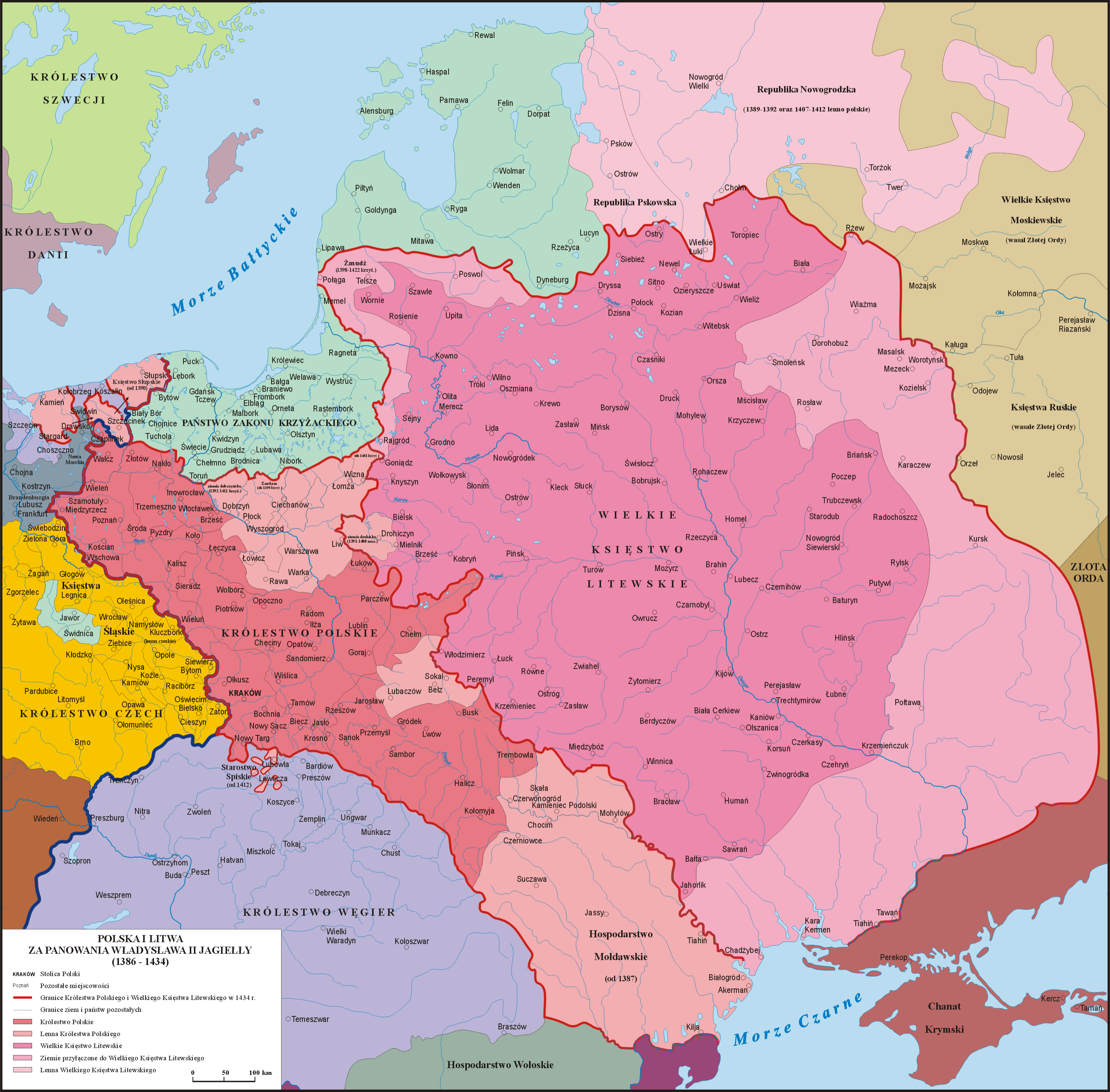
- Map of Kingdom of Poland (1333–1370). Duchy of Słupsk (Księstwo Słupskie) visible north of the Kingdom of Poland – north of the Kingdom and west of the green Teutonic Order territories.
- Status: Duchy of the Polish Crown
- Capital: Słupsk
- Religion: Roman Catholic
- Government: Feudal duchy
- Historical era: Middle Ages
  - Partition: 1368
  - Reunited under Bogislaw X: 1478
Preceded by	Succeeded by
Pomerania-Wolgast	Duchy of Pomerania; Pomerania-Stargard
- Today part of: Poland

The Duchy of Pomerania-Stolp, (Note: German: (Teil-)Herzogtum Pommern-Stolp) also known as the Duchy of Stolp, and the Duchy of Słupsk, (Note: Polish: Księstwo słupskie; Latin: Ducatus Stolpensis) was a feudal duchy in Farther Pomerania. Its capital was Słupsk. It was ruled by the Griffin dynasty. It existed in the High Middle Ages era from 1368 to 1478.

== Background ==
The Duchy of Pomerania was partitioned several times to satisfy the claims of the male members of the ruling House of Pomerania dynasty. The partitions were named after the ducal residences: Pomerania-Barth, -Demmin, -Rügenwalde, -Stettin, -Stolp, and -Wolgast. None of the partitions had a hereditary character, the members of the House of Pomerania inherited the duchy in common. The duchy thus continued to exist as a whole despite its division.

== Creation: Partition of 1368/72 ==
After the death of Barnim IV of Pomerania-Wolgast in 1366, an armed conflict arose when Barnim's brother Bogislaw V refused to share his power with Barnim's sons, Wartislaw VI and Bogislaw VI, and his other brother, Wartislaw V, who in turn allied with Mecklenburg to enforce their claims. On May 25, 1368, a compromise was negotiated in Anklam, which was made a formal treaty on June 8, 1372 in Stargard, and resulted in a partition of Pomerania-Wolgast.

Bogislaw V received most of the Farther Pomeranian parts. Excepted was the land of Neustettin (Szczecinek), which was to be ruled by his brother Wartislaw V, and was integrated into Bogislaw's part-duchy only after his death in 1390. This eastern partition became known as Pomerania-Stolp.

== History ==
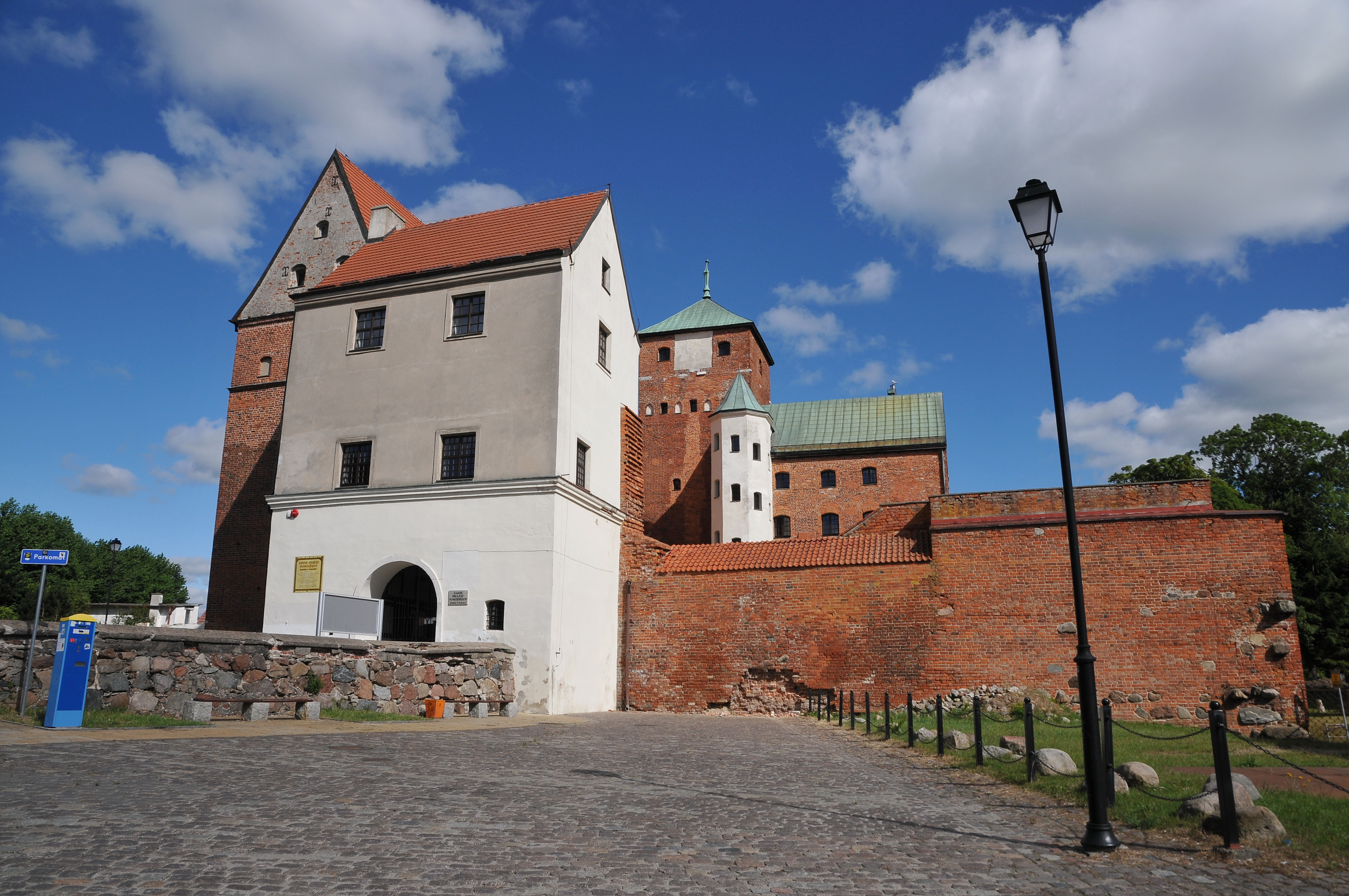
Darłowo Castle

The situation of the descendants of Bogislaw V, who ruled Pomerania-Stolp, differed somewhat from the situation of their western counterparts. The area was more sparsely settled and dominated by powerful noble families, so not much income could be derived by the dukes. On the other hand, the Stolpian branch of the House of Pomerania had relatives among the royal houses of Denmark and Poland. Casimir IV and Elisabeth, the children of Bogislaw V and his first wife Elisabeth, the daughter of Casimir III of Poland, were both raised at the Polish court in Kraków. Elisabeth would become Holy Roman Empress after her marriage with Charles IV, and Casimir was adopted by and designated heir of his grandfather. Yet, his ambitions were thwarted when Louis I of Hungary overruled the testament of Casimir of Poland in 1370, Casimir of Pomerania-Stolp only for a short time took the land of Dobrzyń as a fief.

=== Treaty of Pyzdry ===
During the Polish–Teutonic wars, the Pomeranian dukes changed sides between Poland and the knights very frequently. Wartislaw VII and Barnim V allied with the Teutonic Order. In 1390 however, after Polish King Władysław II Jagiełło had promised to hand part of the heritage of Casimir IV, Wartislaw VII's stepbrother, over to Wartislaw, the latter concluded an alliance with Poland and received the Polish castellany of Nakło and probably some adjacent areas as a fief in return, declaring himself a vassal of Jagiełło III in Pyzdry.

Scholars offer somewhat different interpretations of the treaty of Pyzdry. According to scholars such as Juliusz Bardach, Władysław Czapliński, Fenrych (1961), Marceli Kosman, Tadeusz Ładogórski, Andrzej Nowakowski, Michał Sczaniecki and Kazimierz Ślaski, Wartislaw's oath was for all territory held by him and meant that Pomerania-Stolp itself become a Polish fief. Other descriptions of the treaty included an oath of vassalage of Wartislaw VII to Jagiełło without specifying a territory: Gòrski (1947), Labuda (1948),; Mitkowski (1946) and Zientara (1969) wrote the oath was for the territory Waritislaw received as fiefs from Jagiełło (especially Nakło); Mielcarz (1976) said the oath was binding only Wartislaw himself, as a person, to Jagiełło; and Gumowski (1951) said the document shows Wartislaw giving a general solemn promise of service. Czacharowski (2001) says it was an alliance and refers to Nakło being held as a Polish fief.

With respect to the discourse in Polish historiography, Branig and Buchholz (1997) say that however the treaty is interpreted, it did not have any significance for the future. The vassalage was short-lived; Wartislaw's brothers Barnim V and Bogislaw VIII however took on a friendly attitude towards the Teutonic Order, and Naklo returned to the Polish Crown after Wartislaw's death.

=== After early 1390s ===
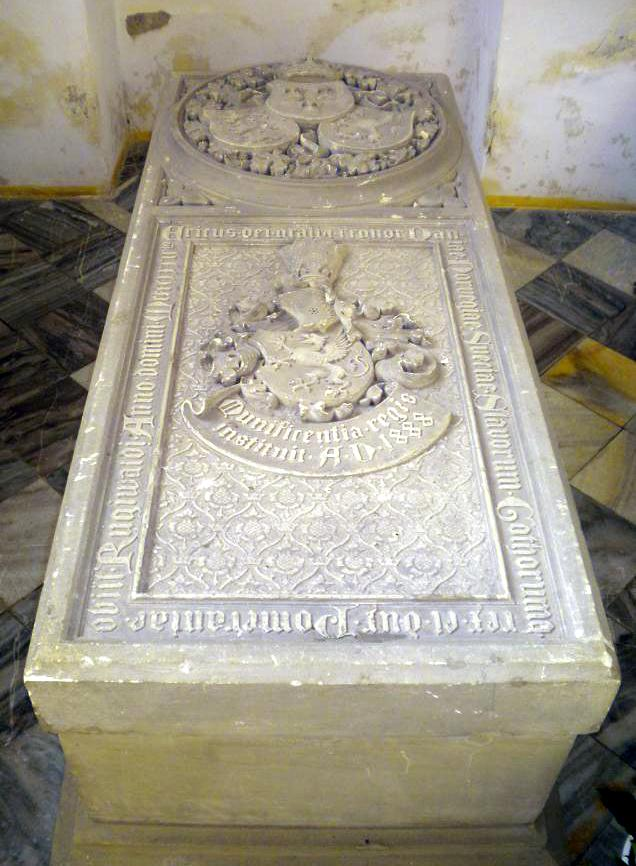
Tomb of Eric I in Our Lady of Częstochowa Church, Darłowo

Eric of Pomerania, grand-grandchild of Danish king Valdemar IV in contrast became king of the Kalmar Union in 1397. Eric however failed in his most ambitious plan, to make Bogislaw IX king of both the Kalmar Union and the Polish–Lithuanian Commonwealth. Eric had to leave Denmark in 1449 and ruled Pomerania-Rügenwalde (Darłowo), a small partition of Pomerania-Stolp, until his death in 1459.

Pomerania-Stolp was a crucial point in the knights' land supply route. Bogislaw VIII of Pomerania-Stolp allied with both the Teutonic Knights and Poland, but supported the latter after the war had started in 1409 by blocking his lands for the knights' troops and allowing his nobles to kidnap those who were travelling his lands. For his aid, he was granted the Lauenburg (Lębork) and Bütow (Bytów) areas (Lauenburg and Bütow Land) and others, but those were lost in the First Peace of Thorn in 1411.

==== Gain of Lauenburg and Bütow Land (1455–1467) ====
Eric II of Pomerania-(Wolgast)-Stolp allied with the Polish king Casimir IV in his Thirteen Years' War against the Teutonic Knights. On January 3, 1455, he in turn was granted the Lauenburg and Bütow Land at the Pomerelian frontier. When Lębork was retaken by the knights in 1459, the Polish king was upset and ravaged the Stolp area. Eric reconciled with the king on August 21, 1466, and bought the town from the knights on October 11, six days before the Second Peace of Thorn, which was signed by Eric in 1467.

== Bogislaw X becomes sole ruler of the duchy of Pomerania (1478) ==
Pomerania-Wolgast was reunited following the death of both Barnim VII and Barnim VIII in 1451. Both dukes died of the Black Death. The same disease caused the death of Joachim of Pomerania-Stettin (also in 1451), Ertmar and Swantibor, children of Wartislaw X, and Otto III of Pomerania-Stettin (all in 1464). Thus, the line of Pomerania-Stettin had died out.

The extinction of the House of Pomerania-Stettin triggered a conflict about inheritance with the Margraviate of Brandenburg. In the Treaty of Soldin of 1466, a compromise was negotiated: Wartislaw X and Eric II, the dukes of Pomerania, took over Pomerania-Stettin as a Brandenburgian fief. This was disputed already during the same year by the emperor, who intervened against the Brandenburgian overlordship of Pomerania. This led to a series of further warfare and truces, that were ended by the Treaty of Prenzlau of 1472, basically confirming the ruling of the Soldin treaty, but settling on a border north of Gartz (Oder) resembling Brandenburg's recent gains. This treaty was accepted by the emperor.

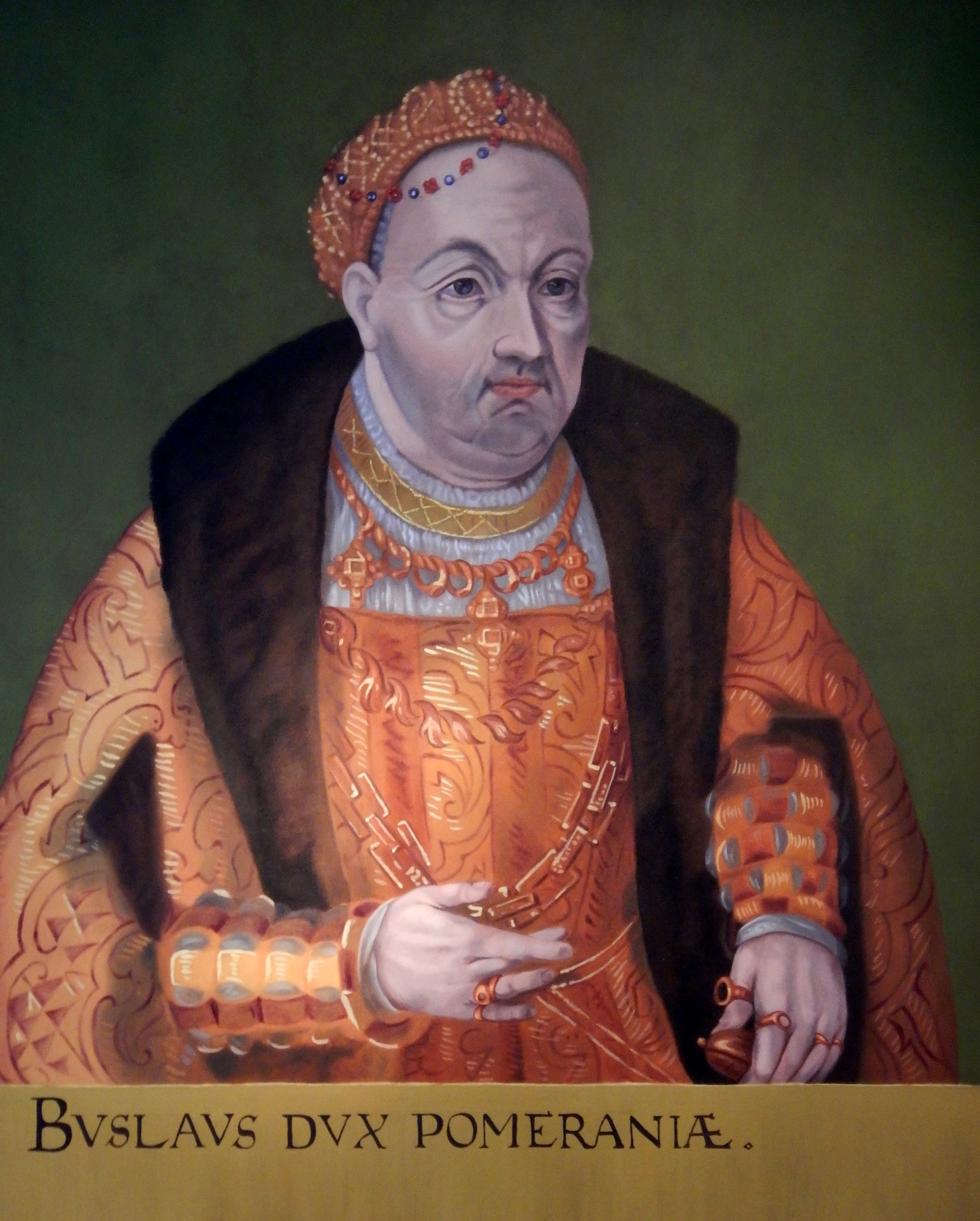
Bogislaw X

In 1474, Eric II died of the Black Death, and his son Bogislaw X inherited Pomerania-Stolp. Bogislaw's brothers had died the same year. After the death of his uncle Wartislaw X in 1478, he became the first sole ruler in the Duchy of Pomerania since almost 200 years.

Eric II had left Pomerania in tense conflicts with Brandenburg and Mecklenburg. Bogislaw managed to resolve these conflicts by both diplomatic and military means. He married his sister, Sophia, to Magnus II, Duke of Mecklenburg, and his other sister, Magarete, was married to Magnus's brother Balthasar. Bogislaw himself married Magarete, daughter of Brandenburg's Prince-elector Frederick II. Also, in 1478, Bogislaw regained areas lost to Brandenburg by his father, most notably the town of Gartz and other small towns and castles north of the Brandenburgian Uckermark. During the confirmation of the Peace of Prenzlau in 1479, the border was finally settled north of Strasburg and Bogislaw had to take his possessions as a fief from Brandenburg.

== Dukes ==
- 1368-1373 Bogislaw V
- 1374-1377 Casimir IV (V)
- 1377-1395 Wartislaw VII
- 1395-1402 Bogislaw VIII and Barnim V
- 1402-1403 Barnim V
- 1403-1418 Bogislaw VIII
- 1418-1446 Bogislaw IX
- 1449-1459 Eric I
- 1459-1474 Eric II
- 1474-1478 Bogislaw X

== See also ==
- Duchy of Pomerania
- Pomerania during the Late Middle Ages
