= List of LGBTQ politicians in Poland =

The following is a list of individuals who have been elected to a political office in Poland, who fall under the umbrella of LGBT identities, including gay, lesbian, bisexual and/or transgender individuals.

== National parliament ==
Portrait	Name	Office	Years in office	Sexual orientation/ gender identity	Notes	Ref.
	Jerzy Andrzejewski (1909–1983)	Member of the Sejm	1952–1956	Gay or bisexual	One of two first queer elected officials (both entered office in 1952). Publicly outed posthumously.	
	Jarosław Iwaszkiewicz (1894–1980)	Member of the Sejm	1952–1980	Gay or bisexual	One of two first queer elected officials (both elected in 1952). Publicly outed posthumously. He self-identified as gay, however by modern standards is viewed as bisexual.	
	Jerzy Zawieyski (1902–1969)	Member of the Sejm	1956–1969	Gay	Publicly outed posthumously	
	Jerzy Zawieyski (1902–1969)	Member of the State Council	1956–1968	Gay	Publicly outed posthumously	
	Anna Grodzka (born 1954)	Member of the Sejm	2011–2015	Transgender	First transgender person in elected office.	
	Robert Biedroń (born 1976)	Member of the Sejm	2011–2014	Gay	First openly gay male member of the Sejm	
	Hanna Gill-Piątek (born 1974)	Member of the Sejm	2019–2023	Bisexual	One of two first bisexual women in the Sejm (both entered office in 2019)	
	Krzysztof Śmiszek (born 1979)	Member of the Sejm	2019–2024	Gay	First gay secretary of state	
	Krzysztof Śmiszek (born 1979)	Secretary of state of the Ministry of Justice	2023–2024	Gay	First gay secretary of state	
	Anna Maria Żukowska (born 1983)	Member of the Sejm	2019–present	Bisexual	One of two first bisexual women in the Sejm (both entered office in 2019)	
	Marcin Józefaciuk (born 1982)	Member of the Sejm	2023–present	Gay		

== European Parliament ==
Portrait	Name	Office	Years in office	Sexual orientation/ gender identity	Notes	Ref.
	Robert Biedroń (born 1976)	Member of the European Parliament representing Poland	2019–present	Gay	First gay member of the European Parliament representing Poland	
	Krzysztof Śmiszek (born 1979)	Member of the European Parliament representing Poland	2024–present	Gay		

== Sub-national level ==
=== Regional assemblies ===
Portrait	Name	Office	Years in office	Sexual orientation/ gender identity	Notes	Ref.
	Hanna Gill-Piątek (born 1974)	Member of the Łódź Voivodeship Sejmik	2023–present	Bisexual	First bisexual member of a regional assembly (sejmik)	

=== Municipal mayors ===
Portrait	Name	Office	Years in office	Sexual orientation/ gender identity	Notes	Ref.
	Robert Biedroń (born 1976)	Mayor of Słupsk	2014–2018	Gay	First gay mayor	
	Łukasz Włodarczyk (born 1985 or 1986)	Sołtys of Bobrowniki	2017–2019	Gay	First gay sołtys (mayor of a village)	
	Paweł Rabiej (born 1971)	Deputy mayor of Warsaw	2018–2020	Gay	First gay deputy mayor	

=== Municipal councils ===
Portrait	Name	Office	Years in office	Sexual orientation/ gender identity	Notes	Ref.
	Krystian Legierski (born 1978)	Member of the Warsaw City Council	2010–2014	Gay	First openly gay elected official in Poland; first gay councillor	
	Zuzanna Bartel (born 1989 or 1990)	Member of the Poznań City Council	2024–present	Lesbian	One of two first lesbian elected officials in Poland and one of two first lesbian councillor (both entered office in 2024)	
	Jakub Janas (born 2000 or 2001)	Member of the Wrocław City Council	2024–present	Gay		
	Marta Magott (born 1990)	Member of the Gdańsk City Council	2024–present	Lesbian	One of two first lesbian elected officials in Poland and one of two first lesbian councillor (both entered office in 2024)	
	Aleksandra Owca (born 1992)	Member of the Kraków City Council	2024–present	Bisexual	First bisexual councillor	

== See also ==
- LGBT history in Poland
- LGBT rights in Poland
