= Głodowo =

Głodowo may refer to the following places:

- Głodowo, Lipno County in Kuyavian-Pomeranian Voivodeship (north-central Poland)
- Głodowo, Świecie County in Kuyavian-Pomeranian Voivodeship (north-central Poland)
- Głodowo, Masovian Voivodeship (east-central Poland)
- Głodowo, Greater Poland Voivodeship (west-central Poland)
- Głodowo, Gmina Miastko in Pomeranian Voivodeship (north Poland)
- Głodowo, Kościerzyna County in Pomeranian Voivodeship (north Poland)
- Głodowo, Słupsk County in Pomeranian Voivodeship (north Poland)
- Głodowo, Mrągowo County in Warmian-Masurian Voivodeship (north Poland)
- Głodowo, Pisz County in Warmian-Masurian Voivodeship (north Poland)
