= Damnica railway station =

Railway station in Damnica, Poland

Damnica
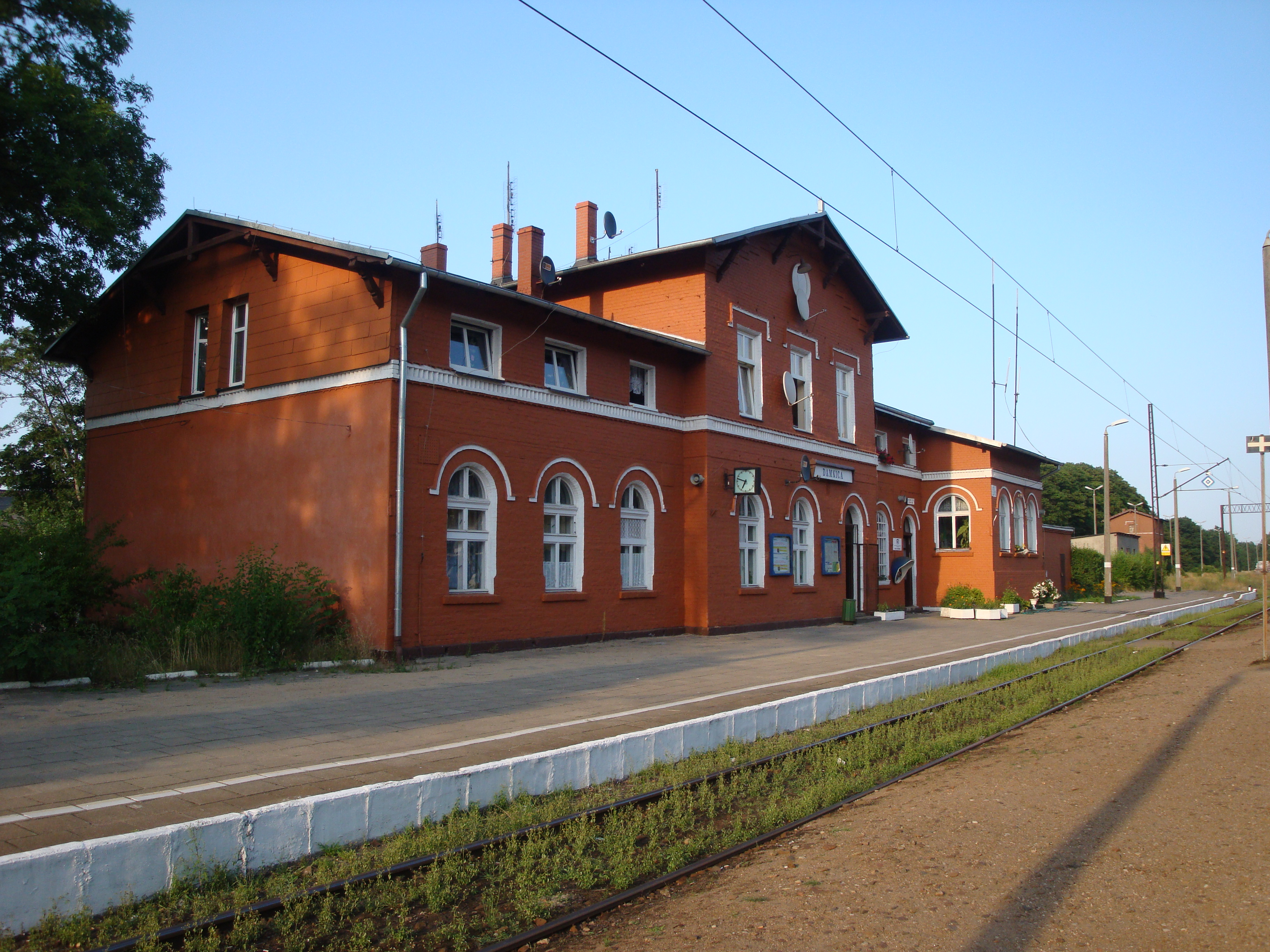

General information
- Location: Poland
- Coordinates: 54°29′53″N 17°16′15″E
- Owner: Polskie Koleje Państwowe S.A.
- Line: 202: Gdańsk Główny–Stargard railway
- Platforms: 2

Construction
- Structure type: Building: Station building

Services
Preceding station	Polregio	Following station
Jezierzyce Słupskie towards Słupsk	PR	Strzyżyno Słupskie towards Tczew
Jezierzyce Słupskie towards Słupsk	PR	Strzyżyno Słupskie towards Malbork
Jezierzyce Słupskie towards Słupsk	PR	Strzyżyno Słupskie towards Elbląg
Jezierzyce Słupskie towards Słupsk	PR	Strzyżyno Słupskie towards Smętowo, Laskowice Pomorskie, or Bydgoszcz Główna
Jezierzyce Słupskie towards Słupsk	PR	Pogorzelice towards Gdynia Główna
Location

Damnica is a PKP railway station in Damnica, Pomeranian Voivodeship, Poland. The station is reached by PR trains from Gdynia.

Since December 10, 2017, Tri-City SKM trains have ceased operating on the Lębork–Słupsk section.

== Lines crossing the station ==
Start station	End station	Line type
Gdańsk Główny	Stargard Szczeciński	Passenger/Freight

== Train services ==
The station is served by the following services:

- Regional services (R) Tczew — Słupsk
- Regional services (R) Malbork — Słupsk
- Regional services (R) Elbląg — Słupsk
- Regional services (R) Słupsk — Bydgoszcz Główna
- Regional services (R) Słupsk — Gdynia Główna
