= LOT Polish Airlines Flight 691 =

1981 aviation accident

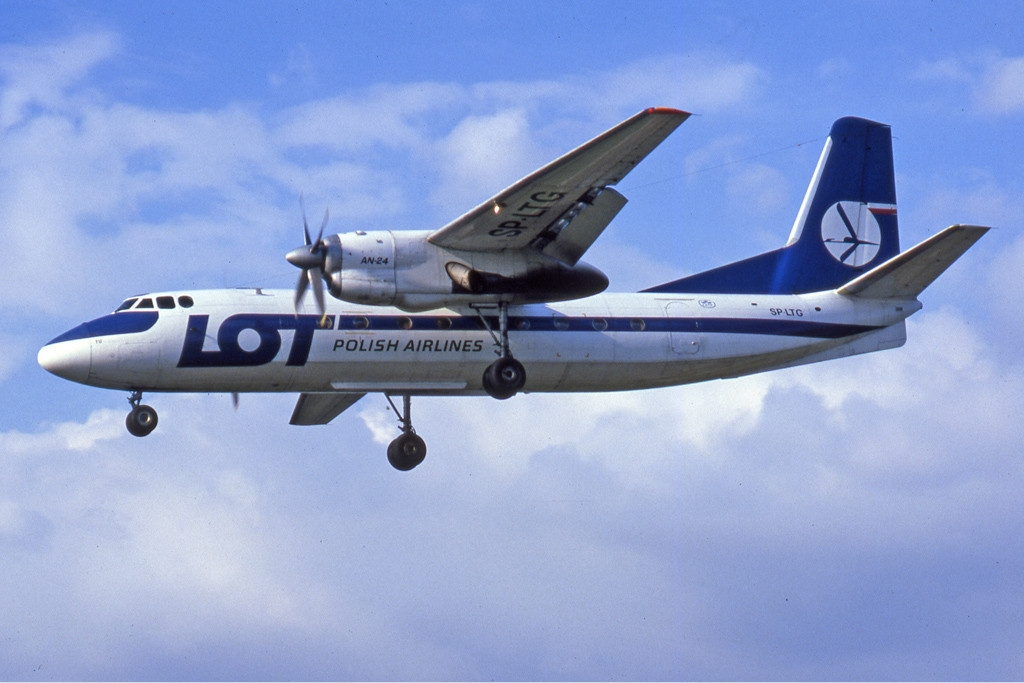
- A LOT Antonov An-24, similar to the one involved

Accident
- Date: 26 March 1981
- Summary: Controlled flight into terrain during approach due to pilot error
- Site: near Wielogłowy, Słupsk County, Poland

Aircraft
- Aircraft type: Antonov An-24V
- Operator: LOT Polish Airlines
- Registration: SP-LTU
- Flight origin: Okęcie Airport, Warsaw, Poland
- Destination: Słupsk-Redzikowo Airport, Słupsk, Poland
- Occupants: 51
- Passengers: 47
- Crew: 4
- Fatalities: 1
- Injuries: 19
- Survivors: 50

LOT Polish Airlines Flight 691 was a domestic passenger flight in Poland from Warsaw to Słupsk. On 26 March 1981, the Antonov An-24 clipped trees and crashed during the final approach to Słupsk-Redzikowo Airport, killing one passenger and injuring 19 people of the 51 on board.

== Accident ==
As the crew maintained radio communication with Słupsk-Redzikowo Airport, they were informed that the plane was on the glide path - at an altitude of 200 meters (660 feet). However, the crew realized they were below the minimun altitude and incresed the engines' power, but the plane had already clipped some trees, tearing off part of its right wing. Less than a minute later, 2,000 meters from the beginning of runway, the plane struck the ground. The plane rolled to the right side, the right landing gear hit the ground and flipped over.

A passenger named Krzysztof Szerszenowicz died in the crash. He was trapped in his seat and could not be extricated without specialized equipment, and he died in the flames. 24 people left the crash site without seeking medical attention. The other 26 victims went to hospitals. Of those, 11 required extended hospital treatment, including one crew member.

== Investigation ==
The cause of the plane crash was concluded to be pilot error, as he had disabled the pressure altimeter which indicated that the plane was too low. This caused the crew to be unaware that they were too low, leading to the subsequent crash.

== In popular culture ==
The accident was featured in the 2004 Polish documentary series Nieznane katastrofy in the episode "Lot 691".
