= Rychława =

Village in Kociewie

- Village
- Interactive map of Rychława
- Coordinates: 53°40′48″N 18°39′45″E
- Country: Poland
- Voivodeship: Kuyavian–Pomeranian
- County: Świecie
- Gmina: Nowe

Population
  - Total: 231
- Postal code: 86-170
- SIMC: 0093007

Rychława is a village in the administrative district of Gmina Nowe, within Świecie County, Kuyavian–Pomeranian Voivodeship, in northern Poland. The settlement lies within the ethnocultural region of Kociewie.

In 2025, the village was awarded a regional prize for a project organised by local residents to renovate the settlement's three bus stops, which included decorating them with designs based on traditional embroidery patterns from Kociewie.
