= Budy, Słupsk County =

Budy
- Village
- Location within Poland
- Coordinates: 54°30′46″N 17°15′8″E
- Country: Poland
- Voivodeship: Pomeranian
- County: Słupsk
- Gmina: Damnica
- Population: 129

Budy [ˈbudɨ] is a village in the administrative district of Gmina Damnica, within Słupsk County, Pomeranian Voivodeship, in northern Poland.
