= Potęgowo railway station =

Railway station in Słupsk County, Poland

Potęgowo
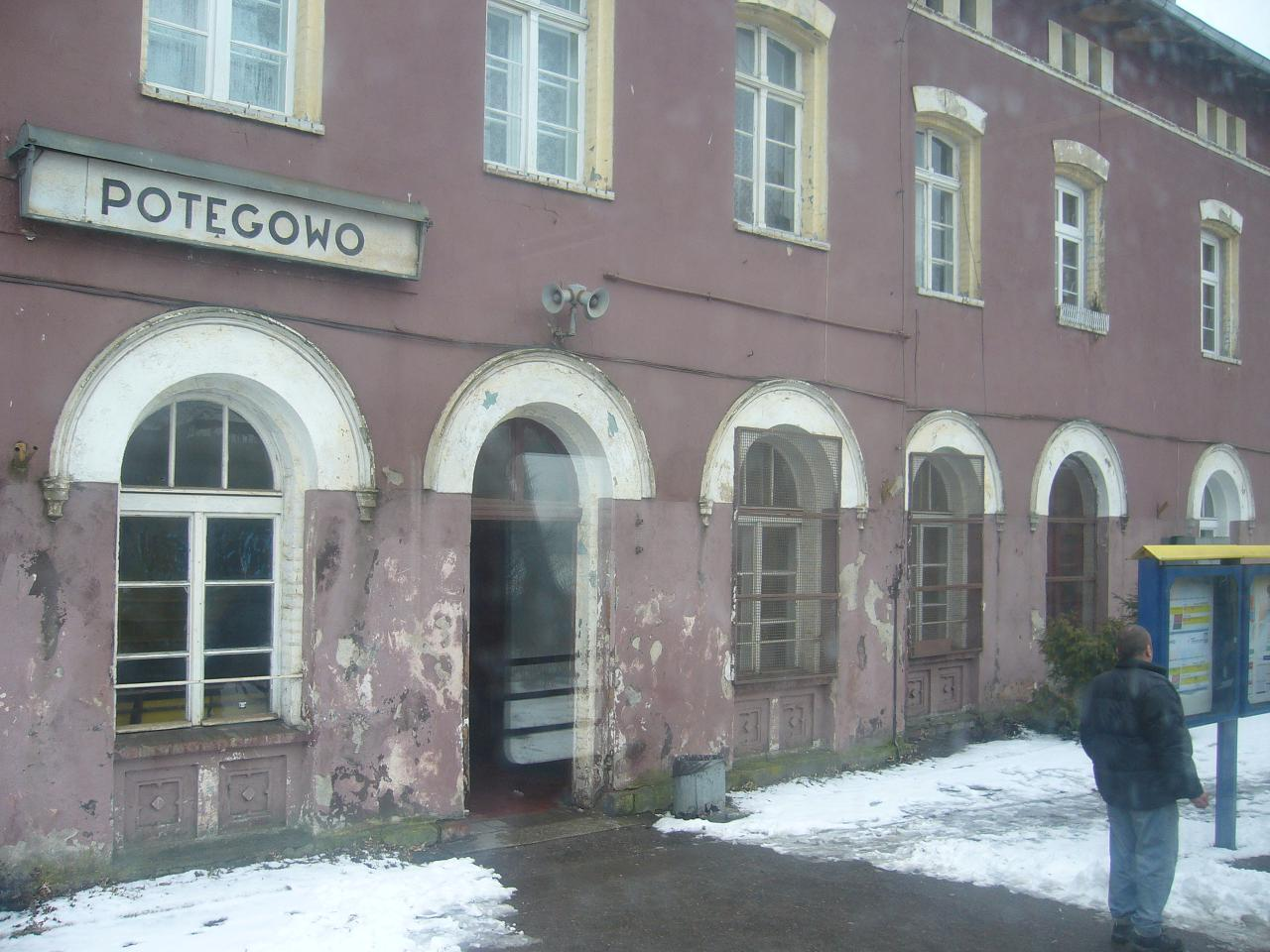

General information
- Location: Potęgowo, Słupsk County; Poland
- Coordinates: 54°29′06″N 17°29′14″E
- Owner: Polskie Koleje Państwowe S.A.
- Line: 202: Gdańsk Główny–Stargard railway

Services
Preceding station	Polregio	Following station
Głuszyno Pomorskie towards Słupsk	PR	Pogorzelice towards Tczew
Głuszyno Pomorskie towards Słupsk	PR	Pogorzelice towards Malbork
Głuszyno Pomorskie towards Słupsk	PR	Pogorzelice towards Elbląg
Głuszyno Pomorskie towards Słupsk	PR	Pogorzelice towards Smętowo, Laskowice Pomorskie, or Bydgoszcz Główna
Głuszyno Pomorskie towards Słupsk	PR	Pogorzelice towards Gdynia Główna
Location

Potęgowo railway station is in Słupsk County in Poland. It is on the line between Gdańsk and Stargard.

== Lines crossing the station ==
Start station	End station	Line type
Gdańsk Główny	Stargard Szczeciński	Passenger/Freight

== Train services ==
The station is served by the following services:

- Regional services (R) Tczew — Słupsk
- Regional services (R) Malbork — Słupsk
- Regional services (R) Elbląg — Słupsk
- Regional services (R) Słupsk — Bydgoszcz Główna
- Regional services (R) Słupsk — Gdynia Główna
