= Jeziorka, Słupsk County =

Jeziorka
- Village
- Location within Poland
- Coordinates: 54°31′50″N 17°24′51″E
- Country: Poland
- Voivodeship: Pomeranian
- County: Słupsk
- Gmina: Damnica
- Population: 40

Jeziorka [jɛˈʑɔrka] (German: Gesorke) is a village in the administrative district of Gmina Damnica, within Słupsk County, Pomeranian Voivodeship, in northern Poland.

In 1938, the Kashubian place name was Germanized to "Kleinwasser" during the renaming of East Prussian placenames, a policy initiated by Nazi Germany.
