= Karżniczka =

- Village
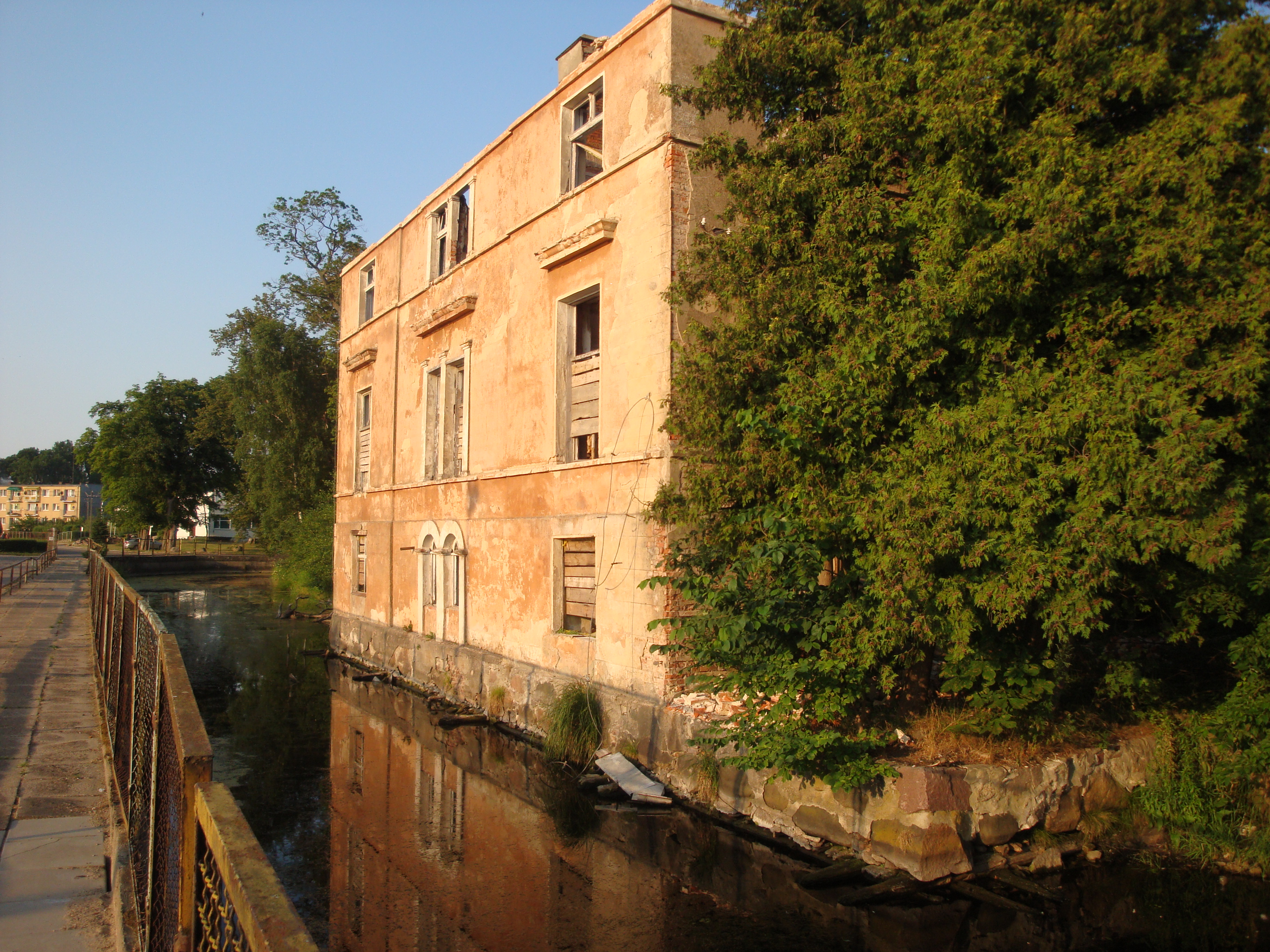
- Ruins of palace in Karżniczka

- Location within Poland
- Coordinates: 54°29′19″N 17°14′1″E
- Country: Poland
- Voivodeship: Pomeranian
- County: Słupsk
- Gmina: Damnica
- Population: 394

Karżniczka [karʐˈnit͡ʂka] (German: Karstnitz) is a village in the administrative district of Gmina Damnica, within Słupsk County, Pomeranian Voivodeship, in northern Poland.

For the history of the region, see History of Pomerania.

== Notable residents ==
- Georg Henning von Puttkamer (1727–1814), German general
