= Kozielec =

Kozielec can refer to:

- Kozielec, a village in Bydgoszcz County, Kuyavian-Pomeranian Voivodeship, Poland
- Kozielec, a village in Świecie County, Kuyavian-Pomeranian Voivodeship, Poland
- Kozielec (Kozelets), an urban-type settlement in Chernihiv Oblast, Ukraine
