= Dąbrówka, Słupsk County =

Dąbrówka
- Village
- Location within Poland
- Coordinates: 54°31′16″N 17°22′51″E
- Country: Poland
- Voivodeship: Pomeranian
- County: Słupsk
- Gmina: Damnica
- Population: 145

Dąbrówka [dɔmˈbrufka] (German: Damerkow) is a village in the administrative district of Gmina Damnica, within Słupsk County, Pomeranian Voivodeship, in northern Poland.

== See also ==
- History of Pomerania
