= Mrówczyno =

- Village
- Location within Poland
- Coordinates: 54°31′42″N 17°14′43″E
- Country: Poland
- Voivodeship: Pomeranian
- County: Słupsk
- Gmina: Damnica
- Population: 52

Mrówczyno [mrufˈt͡ʂɨnɔ] (German: Jägerhof) is a village in the administrative district of Gmina Damnica, within Słupsk County, Pomeranian Voivodeship, in northern Poland.

For the history of the region, see History of Pomerania.
