= Renata Kaznowska =

Polish government official (born 1970)

Renata Marta Kaznowska
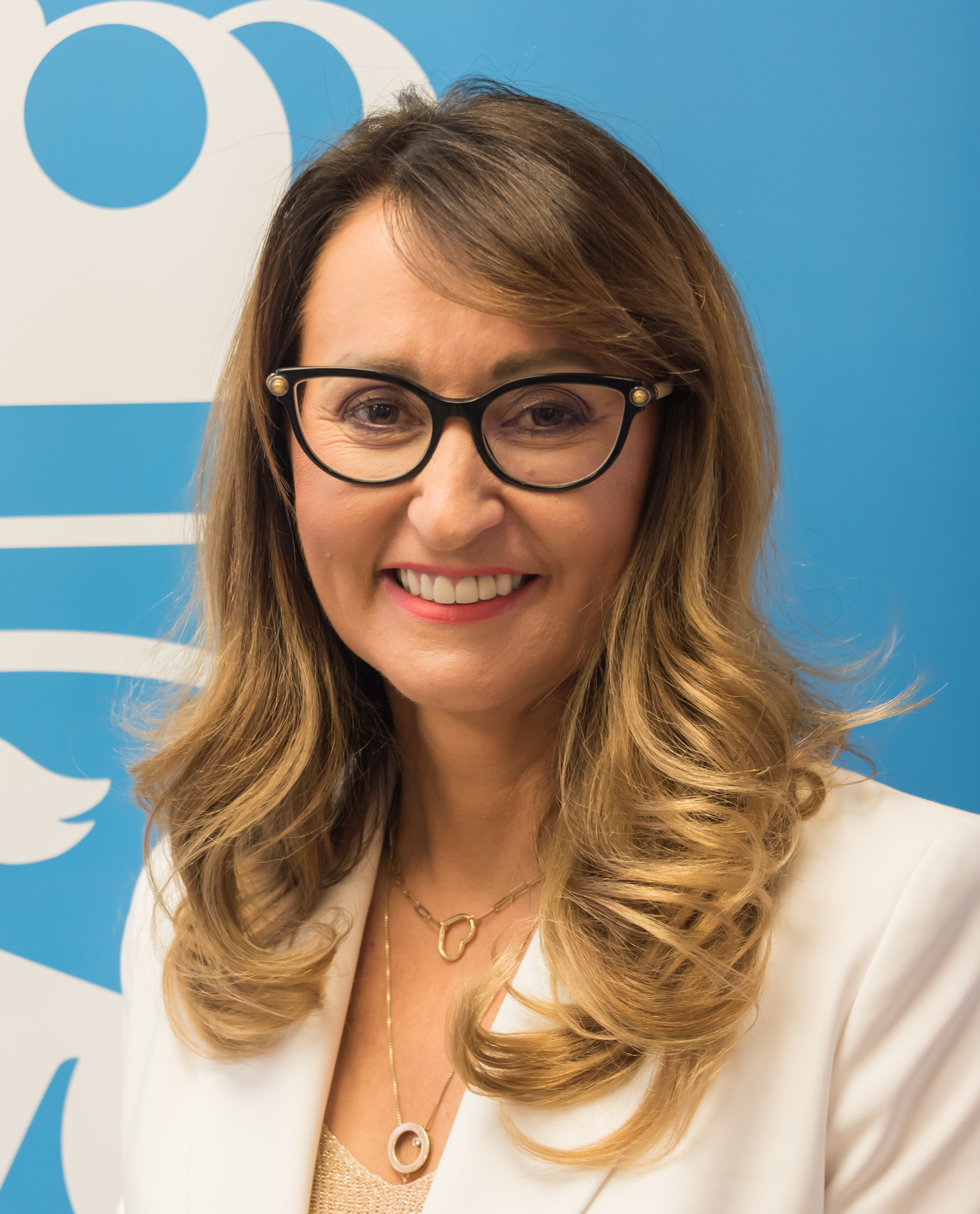
- Kaznowska in 2023

Deputy Mayor of Warsaw
- In office 20 September 2016 – 3 July 2026
- President: Hanna Gronkiewicz-Waltz (until 2016); Rafał Trzaskowski (since 2016)

Personal details
- Born: Renata Maria Stanowska; 20 September 1970 (age 56) Czchów
- Party: Civic Coalition
- Education: University of Warsaw
- Awards: Bronze Cross of Merit; Medal of the Commission of National Education; 80th Anniversary of the Warsaw Uprising Commemorative Medal

Renata Marta Kaznowska (née Stanowska, born 20 September 1970 in Czchów) is a Polish government official who served as the Deputy Mayor of the Capital City of Warsaw from 2016 to 2026.

== Biography ==
She graduated from public administration at the University of Warsaw and has completed a postgraduate programme in European Union Studies at the SGH Warsaw School of Economics, a postgraduate programme in EU Structural Funds at the Faculty of Law of Cardinal Stefan Wyszyński University in Warsaw, and an Executive Master of Business Administration (EMBA) at the Higher School of Management.

She has worked in the local government administration of the Capital City of Warsaw since 1994. From 2003 to 2015, she was Director of the Public Spaces Authority, managing 300 hectares of public space in the city centre (parks, squares, public spaces, roads and an area inscribed on the UNESCO World Heritage List). Among others, she was responsible for the regeneration of the Krasiński Garden, which sparked protests due to the felling of several hundred trees without consultation with local residents.

Between 2015 and 2016, she was Chair of the Board of Palace of Culture and Science sp. z o.o. From 20 September 2016 to 22 November 2018, she served as Deputy Mayor of Warsaw to Hanna Gronkiewicz-Waltz, overseeing the institutions responsible for transport and road infrastructure: the Public Transport Authority, Warsaw Metro, Warsaw Trams, Warsaw Rapid Urban Railway, and the Municipal Bus Services, as well as the Municipal Water Supply and Sewerage Company and the Office for Sport and Recreation.

On 23 November 2018, she was appointed Deputy Mayor of the Capital City of Warsaw by Rafał Trzaskowski. Initially, she was responsible for matters relating to education and housing policy, and oversaw the capital’s Conservator of Monuments and the Office for Sport and Recreation. Following the dismissal of Paweł Rabiej from the post of Deputy Mayor in 2020, she took over his responsibilities, including the health portfolio. During her term of office, which began in 2024, she managed, on behalf of the Mayor, matters relating to architecture, spatial development and mobility policy, education, healthcare and health policy, sport and recreation, and the administration of the City Council, overseeing the Office of Education, the Office of Health Policy, the Office of the City Council of Warsaw and the Office of Sport and Recreation.

On 3 July 2026, she resigned from her post as Deputy Mayor of the Capital City of Warsaw.

She sits on the supervisory board of Metro Warszawskie. She also sat on the supervisory board of the Municipal Investment Implementation Company.

She is a member of the Civic Coalition.

== Personal life ==
She is married and has one son, Szymon.

== Awards ==
- Bronze Cross of Merit (2011);
- Medal of the Commission of National Education (2026);
- Jean-Paul-L'Allier Prize for Heritage;
- Silver Medal ‘For Services to the Engineering Corps’ of the Polish Armed Forces;
- Honorary Gold Badge of the Society of Friends of Warsaw;
- 80th Anniversary of the Warsaw Uprising Commemorative Medal (2024).
