= Łojewo, Pomeranian Voivodeship =

Łojewo
- Village
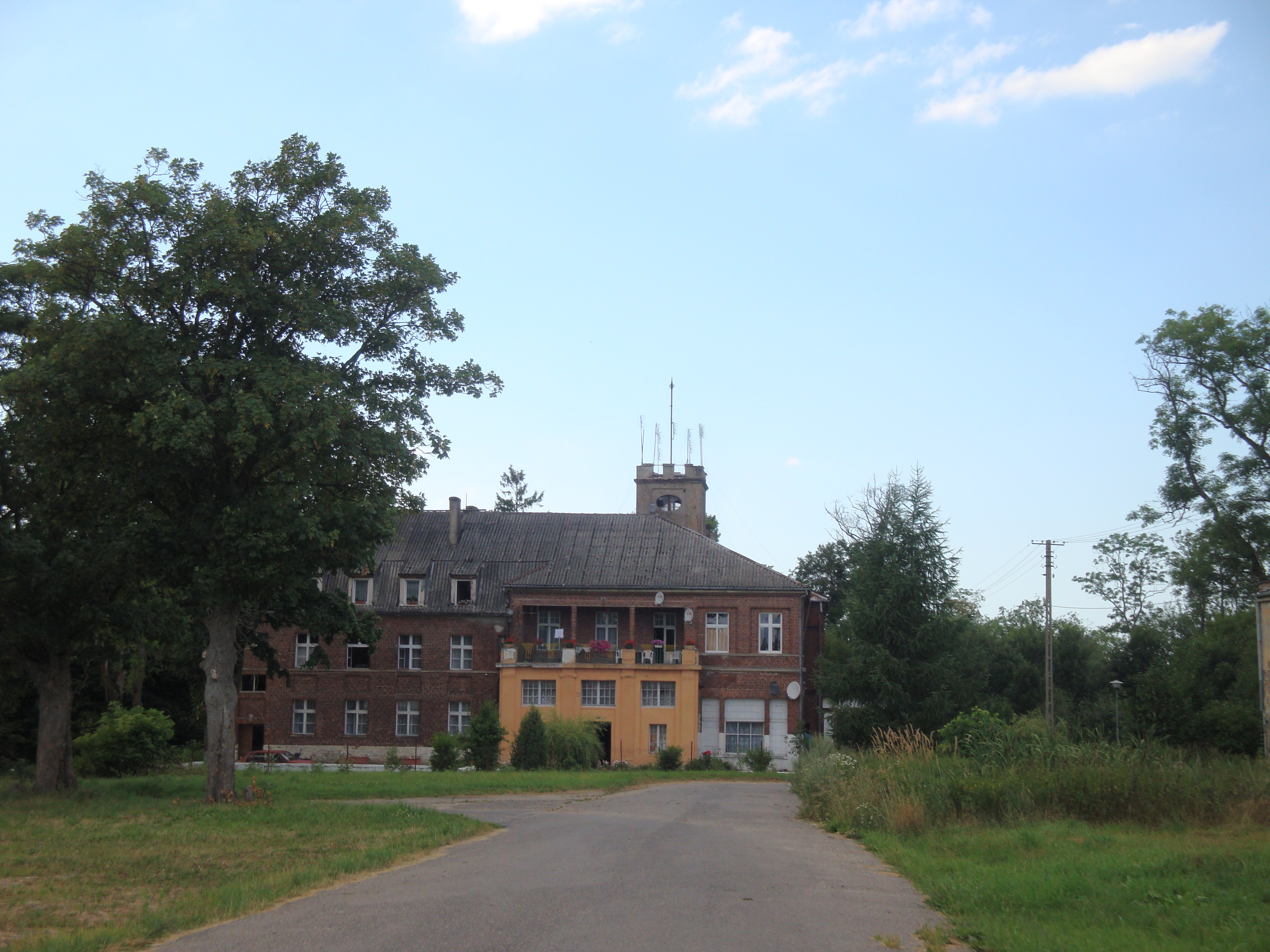
- Palace in Łojewo

- Location within Poland
- Coordinates: 54°32′38″N 17°20′44″E
- Country: Poland
- Voivodeship: Pomeranian
- County: Słupsk
- Gmina: Damnica
- Population: 209

Łojewo [wɔˈjɛvɔ] (German: Lojow) is a village in the administrative district of Gmina Damnica, within Słupsk County, Pomeranian Voivodeship, in northern Poland.

For the history of the region, see History of Pomerania.
