= Domaradz, Pomeranian Voivodeship =

Domaradz
- Village
- Location within Poland
- Coordinates: 54°26′47″N 17°16′7″E
- Country: Poland
- Voivodeship: Pomeranian
- County: Słupsk
- Gmina: Damnica
- Population: 257

Domaradz [dɔˈmarat͡s] (German: Dumröse) is a village in the administrative district of Gmina Damnica, within Słupsk County, Pomeranian Voivodeship, in northern Poland.
