= Stara Dąbrowa, Pomeranian Voivodeship =

Stara Dąbrowa
- Village
- Location within Poland
- Coordinates: 54°27′30″N 17°17′47″E
- Country: Poland
- Voivodeship: Pomeranian
- County: Słupsk
- Gmina: Damnica
- Population: 205

Stara Dąbrowa [ˈstara dɔmˈbrɔva] (German: Alt Damerow) is a village in the administrative district of Gmina Damnica, within Słupsk County, Pomeranian Voivodeship, in northern Poland.

For the history of the region, see History of Pomerania.
