= Domanice, Słupsk County =

Domanice
- Settlement
- Location within Poland
- Coordinates: 54°28′16″N 17°20′53″E
- Country: Poland
- Voivodeship: Pomeranian
- County: Słupsk
- Gmina: Damnica

Domanice [dɔmaˈnit͡sɛ] is a settlement in the administrative district of Gmina Damnica, within Słupsk County, Pomeranian Voivodeship, in northern Poland.
