= Dębniczka =

- Village
- Location within Poland
- Coordinates: 54°30′14″N 17°14′45″E
- Country: Poland
- Voivodeship: Pomeranian
- County: Słupsk
- Gmina: Damnica
- Population: 44

Dębniczka [dɛmbˈnit͡ʂka] is a village in the administrative district of Gmina Damnica, within Słupsk County, Pomeranian Voivodeship, in northern Poland.
