= Jezierzyce Słupskie railway station =

Railway station in Jezierzyce-Osiedle, Poland

Jezierzyce Słupskie
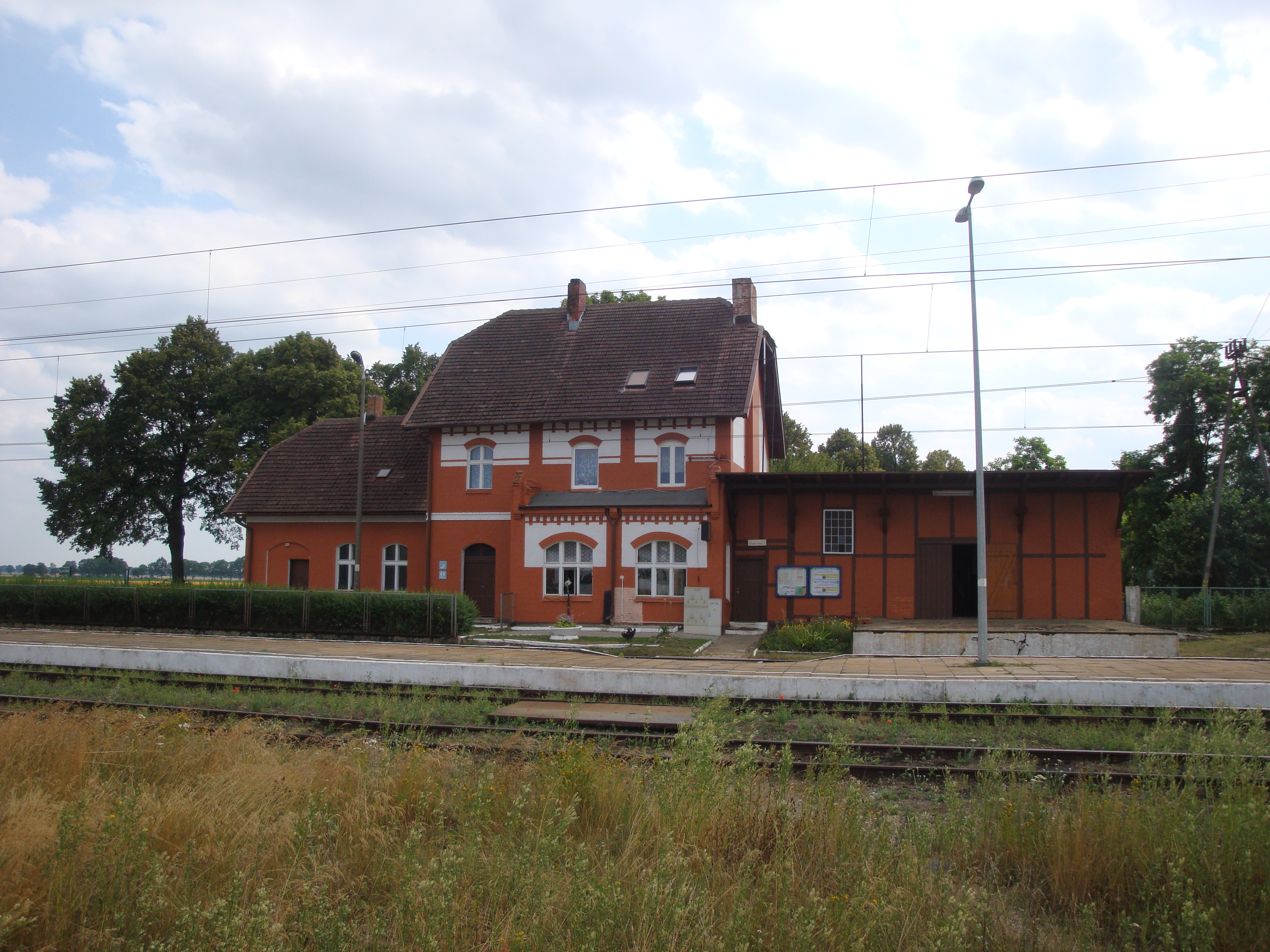

General information
- Location: Poland
- Coordinates: 54°30′15″N 17°07′23″E
- Owner: Polskie Koleje Państwowe S.A.
- Line: 202: Gdańsk Główny–Stargard railway
- Platforms: 1

Construction
- Structure type: Building: Station building

Services
Preceding station	Polregio	Following station
Słupsk Terminus	PR	Damnica towards Tczew
Słupsk Terminus	PR	Damnica towards Malbork
Słupsk Terminus	PR	Damnica towards Elbląg
Słupsk Terminus	PR	Damnica towards Smętowo, Laskowice Pomorskie, or Bydgoszcz Główna
Słupsk Terminus	PR	Pogorzelice towards Gdynia Główna
Location

Jezierzyce Słupskie or Jezierzyce Słupsk is a PKP railway station in Jezierzyce, Pomeranian Voivodeship, Poland. It is a historic railway station built in 1870 in the Prussian Partition of east-central Pomerania (German: Jeseritz), now located on the outskirts of the Jezierzyce housing estate.

The station is reached by PR trains from Gdynia.

== Lines crossing the station ==
Start station	End station	Line type
Gdańsk Główny	Stargard Szczeciński	Passenger/Freight

== Train services ==
The station is served by the following services:

- Regional services (R) Tczew — Słupsk
- Regional services (R) Malbork — Słupsk
- Regional services (R) Elbląg — Słupsk
- Regional services (R) Słupsk — Bydgoszcz Główna
- Regional services (R) Słupsk — Gdynia Główna
