= Strzyżyno Słupskie railway station =

Railway station in Strzyżyno, Poland

Strzyżyno Słupskie
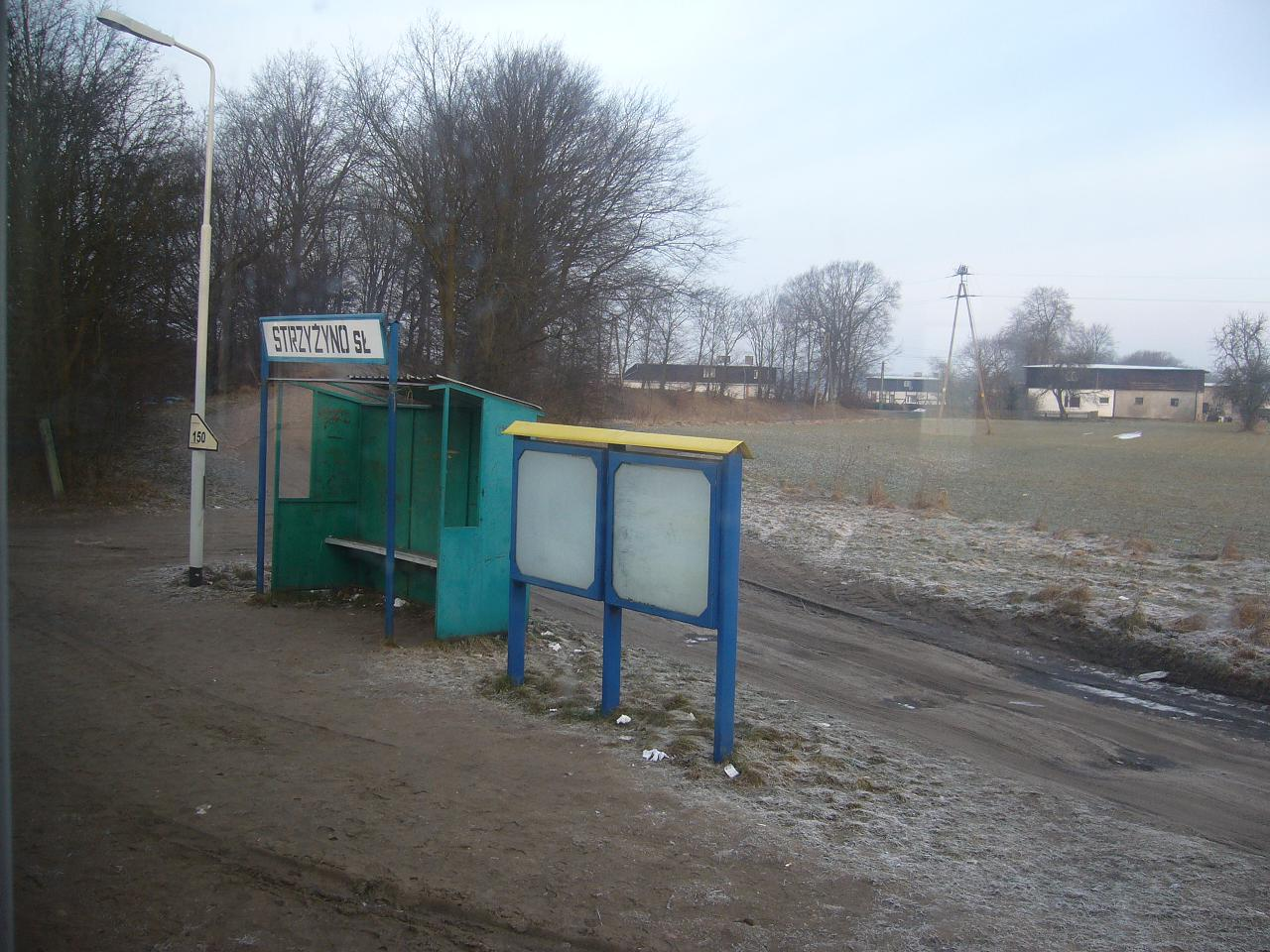

General information
- Location: Strzyżyno; Poland
- Coordinates: 54°29′28″N 17°22′20″E
- Owner: Polskie Koleje Państwowe S.A.
- Line: 202: Gdańsk Główny–Stargard railway

Services
Preceding station	Polregio	Following station
Damnica towards Słupsk	PR	Głuszyno Pomorskie towards Tczew
Damnica towards Słupsk	PR	Głuszyno Pomorskie towards Malbork
Damnica towards Słupsk	PR	Głuszyno Pomorskie towards Elbląg
Damnica towards Słupsk	PR	Głuszyno Pomorskie towards Smętowo, Laskowice Pomorskie, or Bydgoszcz Główna
Damnica towards Słupsk	PR	Głuszyno Pomorskie towards Gdynia Główna
Location

Strzyżyno Slupskie is railway station in Strzyżyno in Pomerania in Poland. The station is reached by PR trains from Gdynia.

== Lines crossing the station ==
Start station	End station	Line type
Gdańsk Główny	Stargard Szczeciński	Passenger/Freight

== Train services ==
The station is served by the following services:

- Regional services (R) Tczew — Słupsk
- Regional services (R) Malbork — Słupsk
- Regional services (R) Elbląg — Słupsk
- Regional services (R) Słupsk — Bydgoszcz Główna
- Regional services (R) Słupsk — Gdynia Główna
