= Bięcino =

- Village
- Location within Poland
- Coordinates: 54°31′20″N 17°13′4″E
- Country: Poland
- Voivodeship: Pomeranian
- County: Słupsk
- Gmina: Damnica

Population
  - Total: 220
- Postal code: 76-231

Bięcino [bjɛnˈt͡ɕinɔ] (German: Benzin) is a village in the administrative district of Gmina Damnica, within Słupsk County, Pomeranian Voivodeship, in northern Poland. It is located in the historic region of Pomerania.

Historically, it was also known in Polish as Biczyno and Bicyno.
