= Łężyca, Słupsk County =

Łężyca
- Village
- Location within Poland
- Coordinates: 54°29′56″N 17°13′32″E
- Country: Poland
- Voivodeship: Pomeranian
- County: Słupsk
- Gmina: Damnica
- Population: 6

Łężyca ([wɛ̃ˈʐɨt͡sa]; (German: Grünhof) is a village in the administrative district of Gmina Damnica, within Słupsk County, Pomeranian Voivodeship, in northern Poland.
