= Świecichowo =

- Village
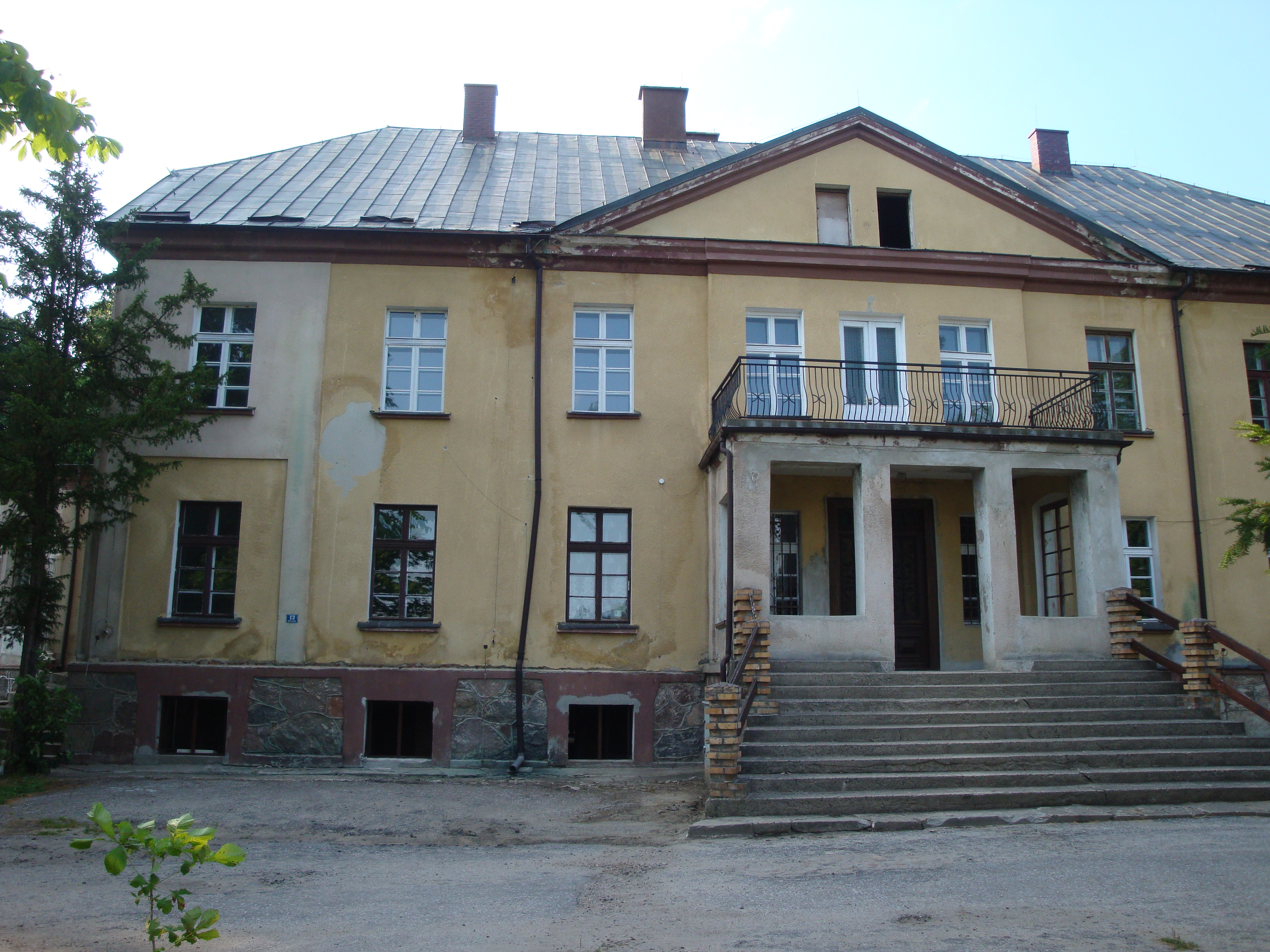
- Manor house in Świecichowo

- Location within Poland
- Coordinates: 54°32′17″N 17°15′33″E
- Country: Poland
- Voivodeship: Pomeranian
- County: Słupsk
- Gmina: Damnica
- Population: 260

Świecichowo (Polish: [ɕfjɛt͡ɕiˈxɔvɔ]) (German: Schwetzkow) is a village in the administrative district of Gmina Damnica, within Słupsk County, Pomeranian Voivodeship, in northern Poland.

For the history of the region, see History of Pomerania.
