= Pastwiska =

Pastwiska may refer to the following places:

- Pastwiska, Kuyavian-Pomeranian Voivodeship (north-central Poland)
- Pastwiska, Masovian Voivodeship (east-central Poland)
- Pastwiska, Subcarpathian Voivodeship (south-east Poland)
- Pastwiska, Warmian-Masurian Voivodeship (north Poland)
- Pastwiska, Cieszyn (south Poland)
