= Łebień, Słupsk County =

Łebień
- Village
- Location within Poland
- Coordinates: 54°29′3″N 17°19′51″E
- Country: Poland
- Voivodeship: Pomeranian
- County: Słupsk
- Gmina: Damnica
- Population: 231

Łebień [ˈwɛbjɛɲ] (German: Labehn) is a village in the administrative district of Gmina Damnica, within Słupsk County, Pomeranian Voivodeship, in northern Poland.

For the history of the region, see History of Pomerania.
