= Wiatrowo, Pomeranian Voivodeship =

Wiatrowo
- Village
- Location within Poland
- Coordinates: 54°33′9″N 17°18′7″E
- Country: Poland
- Voivodeship: Pomeranian
- County: Słupsk
- Gmina: Damnica
- Population: 79

Wiatrowo [vjaˈtrɔvɔ] (German: Viatrow) is a village in the administrative district of Gmina Damnica, within Słupsk County, Pomeranian Voivodeship, in northern Poland.

For the history of the region, see History of Pomerania.
