= Głuszyno Pomorskie railway station =

Railway station in Głuszyno, Poland

Głuszyno Pomorskie
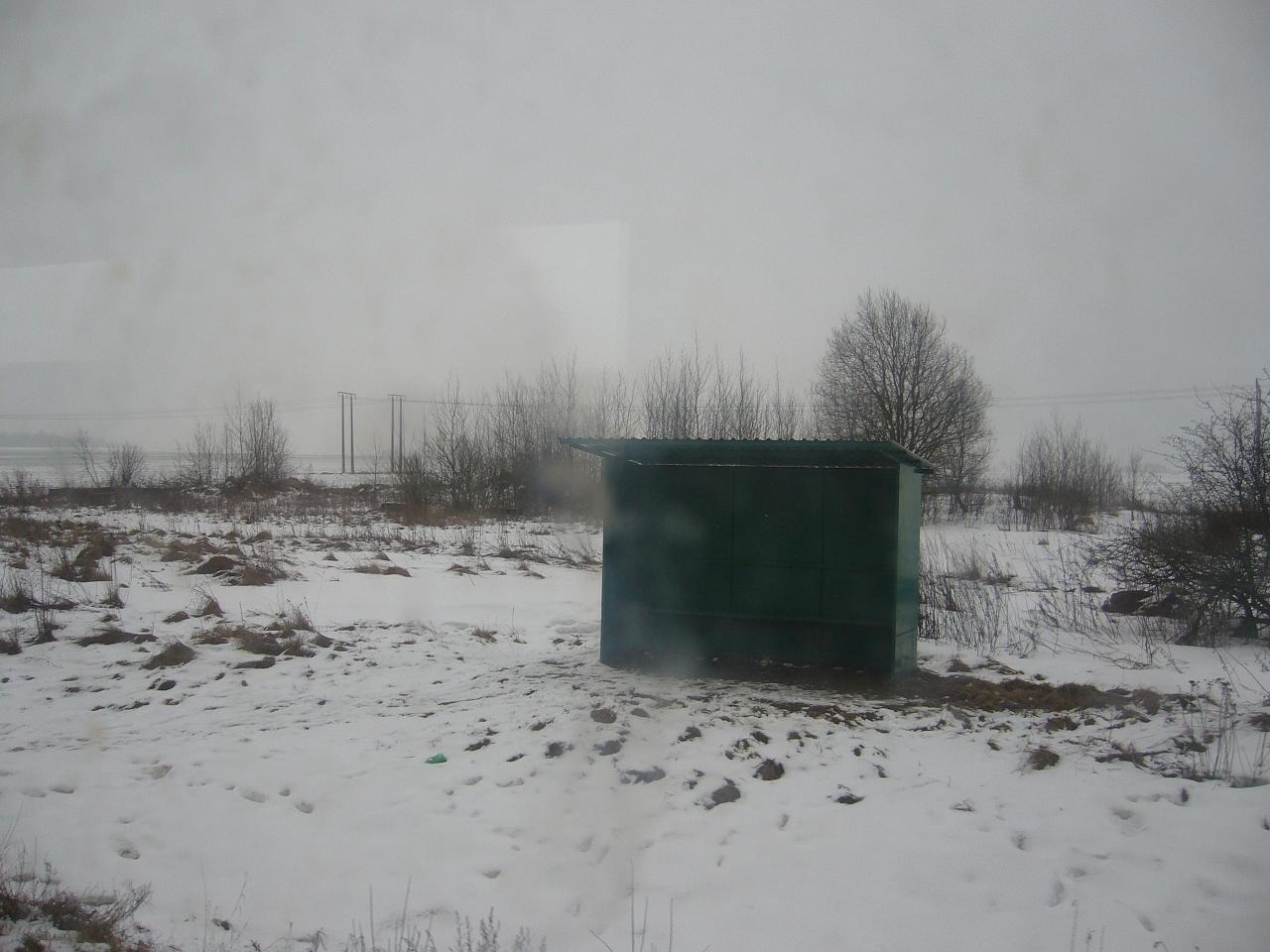

General information
- Location: Poland
- Coordinates: 54°29′24″N 17°25′26″E
- Owner: Polskie Koleje Państwowe S.A.
- Line: 202: Gdańsk Główny–Stargard railway

Services
Preceding station	Polregio	Following station
Strzyżyno Słupskie towards Słupsk	PR	Potęgowo towards Tczew
Strzyżyno Słupskie towards Słupsk	PR	Potęgowo towards Malbork
Strzyżyno Słupskie towards Słupsk	PR	Potęgowo towards Elbląg
Strzyżyno Słupskie towards Słupsk	PR	Potęgowo towards Smętowo, Laskowice Pomorskie, or Bydgoszcz Główna
Strzyżyno Słupskie towards Słupsk	PR	Pogorzelice towards Gdynia Główna
Location

Głuszyno Pomorskie railway station is in Poland. Most trains are departing to: Sopot, Pruszcz Gdański, Gdynia Główna, Gdańsk Wrzeszcz, Gdańsk Oliwa, Gdańsk Główny, Tczew, Gdańsk Orunia, Gdynia Orłowo, and Skowarcz. There are around 50 trains in the weekdays that departs from this station.

== Lines crossing the station ==
Start station	End station	Line type
Gdańsk Główny	Stargard Szczeciński	Passenger/Freight

== Train services ==
The station is served by the following services:

- Regional services (R) Tczew — Słupsk
- Regional services (R) Malbork — Słupsk
- Regional services (R) Elbląg — Słupsk
- Regional services (R) Słupsk — Bydgoszcz Główna
- Regional services (R) Słupsk — Gdynia Główna
