= Milewo, Kuyavian-Pomeranian Voivodeship =

Village in Kociewie

Milewo
- Village
- Location within Poland
- Coordinates: 53°40′5″N 18°39′59″E
- Country: Poland
- Voivodeship: Kuyavian-Pomeranian
- County: Świecie
- Gmina: Nowe
- Population: 170

Milewo [miˈlɛvɔ] is a village in the administrative district of Gmina Nowe, within Świecie County, Kuyavian-Pomeranian Voivodeship, in north-central Poland.
