= Leśnice railway station =

Railway station in Leśnice, Poland

Leśnice
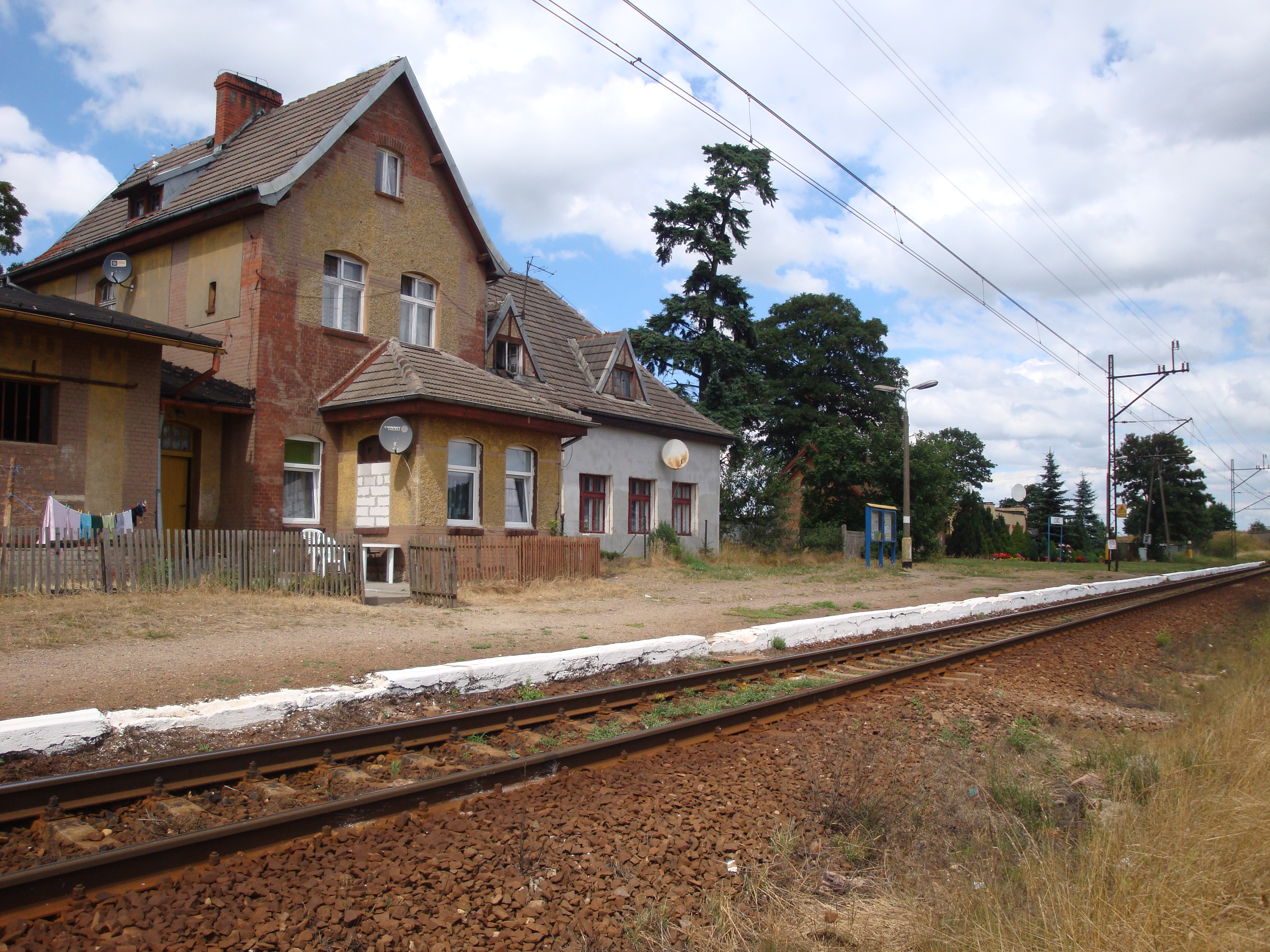

General information
- Location: Leśnice, Pomeranian Voivodeship, Poland
- Coordinates: 54.5140°N 17.6688°E
- Owner: Polskie Koleje Państwowe S.A.
- Line: 202: Gdańsk Główny–Stargard railway

Services
Preceding station	Polregio	Following station
Pogorzelice towards Słupsk	PR	Lębork towards Tczew
Pogorzelice towards Słupsk	PR	Lębork towards Malbork
Pogorzelice towards Słupsk	PR	Lębork towards Elbląg
Pogorzelice towards Słupsk	PR	Lębork towards Smętowo, Laskowice Pomorskie, or Bydgoszcz Główna
Pogorzelice towards Słupsk	PR	Lębork towards Gdynia Główna
Location

Leśnice is a PKP railway station in Mosty (Pomeranian Voivodeship), Poland.

== Lines crossing the station ==
Start station	End station	Line type
Gdańsk Główny	Stargard Szczeciński	Passenger/Freight

== Train services ==
The station is served by the following services:

- Regional services (R) Tczew — Słupsk
- Regional services (R) Malbork — Słupsk
- Regional services (R) Elbląg — Słupsk
- Regional services (R) Słupsk — Bydgoszcz Główna
- Regional services (R) Słupsk — Gdynia Główna
