= Głodowo, Słupsk County =

Głodowo
- Village
- Location within Poland
- Coordinates: 54°31′42″N 17°17′7″E
- Country: Poland
- Voivodeship: Pomeranian
- County: Słupsk
- Gmina: Damnica
- Population: 14

Głodowo [ɡwɔˈdɔvɔ] is a village in the administrative district of Gmina Damnica, within Słupsk County, Pomeranian Voivodeship, in northern Poland.

== See also ==
History of Pomerania
