= Bobrowniki, Pomeranian Voivodeship =

Bobrowniki
- Village
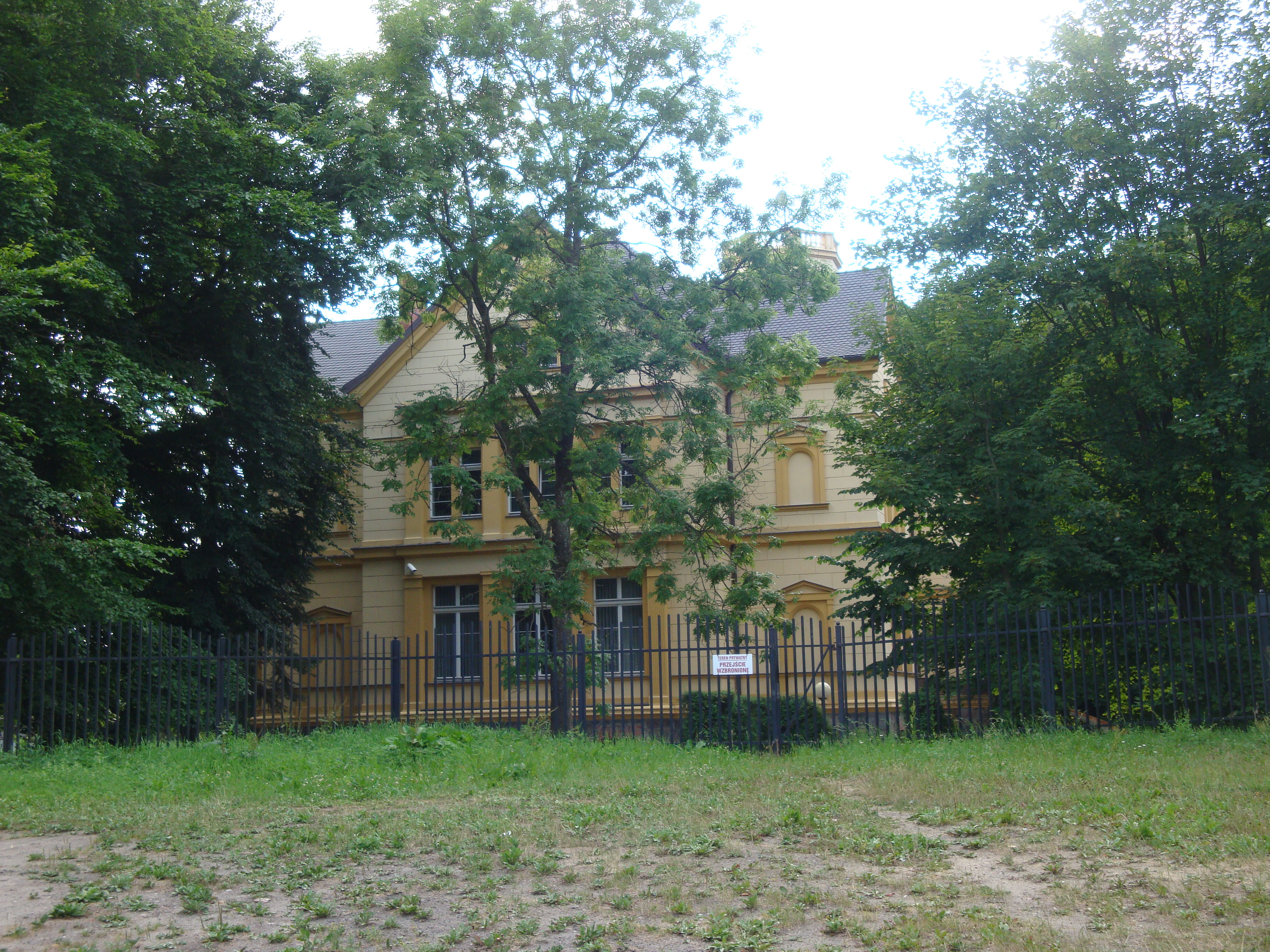
- Palace in Bobrowniki

- Location within Poland
- Coordinates: 54°31′32″N 17°20′9″E
- Country: Poland
- Voivodeship: Pomeranian
- County: Słupsk
- Gmina: Damnica
- Population: 860

Bobrowniki [bɔbrɔvˈniki] (German: Bewersdorf) is a village in the administrative district of Gmina Damnica, within Słupsk County, Pomeranian Voivodeship, in northern Poland.
