= Gmina Damnica =

Gmina Damnica Damnica Commune
- Gmina
- Coat of arms
- Interactive map of Gmina Damnica
- Coordinates (Damnica): 54°30′7″N 17°16′13″E
- Country: Poland
- Voivodeship: Pomeranian
- County: Słupsk County
- Seat: Damnica

Area
  - Total: 167.81 km^{2} (64.79 sq mi)

Population (2006)
  - Total: 6,293
  - Density: 37.50/km^{2} (97.13/sq mi)
- Website: http://www.damnica.pl/

Gmina Damnica is a rural gmina (administrative district) in Słupsk County, Pomeranian Voivodeship, in northern Poland. Its seat is the village of Damnica, which lies approximately 17 kilometres (11 mi) east of Słupsk and 90 km (56 mi) west of the regional capital Gdańsk.

The gmina covers an area of 167.81 square kilometres (64.8 sq mi), and as of 2006 its total population is 6,293.

== Villages ==
Gmina Damnica contains the villages and settlements of Bięcino, Bobrowniki, Budy, Dąbrówka, Damnica, Damno, Dębniczka, Domanice, Domaradz, Głodowo, Jeziorka, Karżniczka, Łebień, Łężyca, Łojewo, Mianowice, Mrówczyno, Paprzyce, Sąborze, Skibin, Stara Dąbrowa, Strzyżyno, Świecichowo, Świtały, Wiatrowo, Wielogłowy, Wiszno, Zagórzyca and Zagórzyczki.

== Neighbouring gminas ==
Gmina Damnica is bordered by the gminas of Dębnica Kaszubska, Główczyce, Potęgowo and Słupsk.
