= Przyny =

Village in Kociewie

- Village
- Location within Poland
- Coordinates: 53°39′39″N 18°41′7″E
- Country: Poland
- Voivodeship: Kuyavian-Pomeranian
- County: Świecie
- Gmina: Nowe

Przyny [ˈpʂɨnɨ] is a village in the administrative district of Gmina Nowe, within Świecie County, Kuyavian-Pomeranian Voivodeship, in north-central Poland.
