= Zabijak, Kuyavian-Pomeranian Voivodeship =

Village in Kociewie

Zabijak
- Village
- Location within Poland
- Coordinates: 53°38′58″N 18°36′2″E
- Country: Poland
- Voivodeship: Kuyavian-Pomeranian
- County: Świecie
- Gmina: Nowe

Zabijak [zaˈbijak] is a village in the administrative district of Gmina Nowe, within Świecie County, Kuyavian-Pomeranian Voivodeship, in north-central Poland.
