= Gajewo-Zabudowania =

Village in Kociewie

- Village
- Location within Poland
- Coordinates: 53°29′26″N 18°38′7″E
- Country: Poland
- Voivodeship: Kuyavian-Pomeranian
- County: Świecie
- Gmina: Nowe
- Population: 110

Gajewo-Zabudowania (formerly Zabudowania Gajewskie [zabudɔˈvaɲa ɡaˈjɛfskʲɛ]) is a village in the administrative district of Gmina Nowe, within Świecie County, Kuyavian-Pomeranian Voivodeship, in north-central Poland.
