= Twarda Góra =

Village in Kociewie

- Village
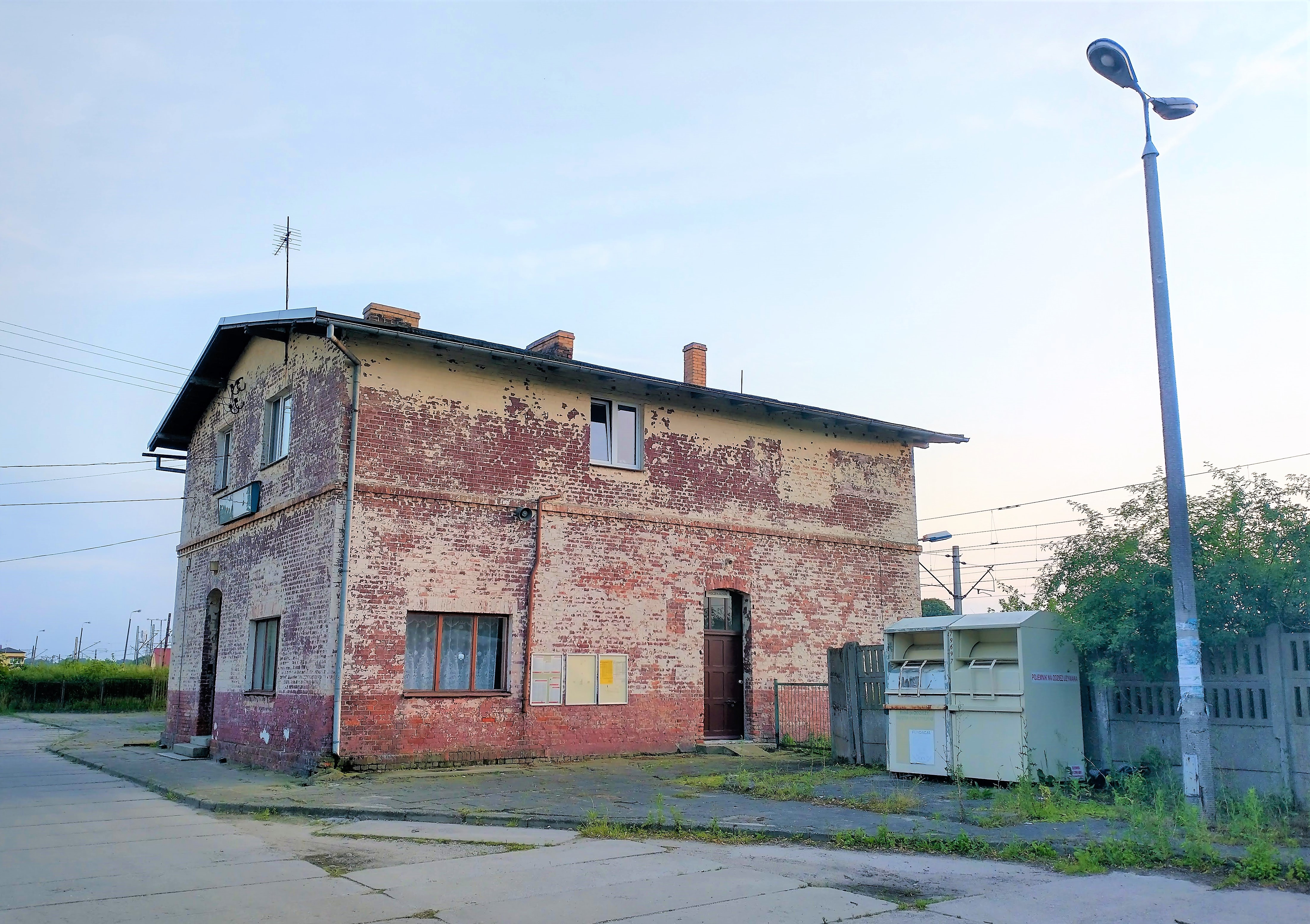
- Exterior view of the village railway station

- Location within Poland
- Coordinates: 53°40′44″N 18°40′9″E
- Country: Poland
- Voivodeship: Kuyavian-Pomeranian
- County: Świecie
- Gmina: Nowe
- Population: 350

Twarda Góra [ˈtfarda ˈɡura] is a village in the administrative district of Gmina Nowe, within Świecie County, Kuyavian-Pomeranian Voivodeship, in north-central Poland. Twarda Góra is located within the ethnocultural region of Kociewie.
