= Piaski, Świecie County =

Village in Kociewie

Piaski
- Village
- Location within Poland
- Coordinates: 53°36′49″N 18°41′35″E
- Country: Poland
- Voivodeship: Kuyavian-Pomeranian
- County: Świecie
- Gmina: Nowe

Piaski (Polish pronunciation: [ˈpjaskʲi]) is a village in the administrative district of Gmina Nowe, within Świecie County, Kuyavian-Pomeranian Voivodeship, in north-central Poland.
