= Dolne Morgi =

Village in Kociewie

- Village
- Location within Poland
- Coordinates: 53°37′44″N 18°42′49″E
- Country: Poland
- Voivodeship: Kuyavian-Pomeranian
- County: Świecie
- Gmina: Nowe
- Population: 140

Dolne Morgi [ˈdɔlnɛ ˈmɔrɡi] is a village in the administrative district of Gmina Nowe, within Świecie County, Kuyavian-Pomeranian Voivodeship, in north-central Poland.
