= Wielogłowy, Pomeranian Voivodeship =

Wielogłowy
- Village
- Location within Poland
- Coordinates: 54°28′34″N 17°9′27″E
- Country: Poland
- Voivodeship: Pomeranian
- County: Słupsk
- Gmina: Damnica
- Population: 160

Wielogłowy [vjɛlɔˈɡwɔvɨ] (German: Vilgelow) is a village in the administrative district of Gmina Damnica, within Słupsk County, Pomeranian Voivodeship, in northern Poland.

For the history of the region, see History of Pomerania.
