= Pogorzelice =

- Village
- Location within Poland
- Coordinates: 54°29′53″N 17°38′0″E
- Country: Poland
- Voivodeship: Pomeranian
- County: Lębork
- Gmina: Nowa Wieś Lęborska
- Population: 405
- Website: www.pogorzelice.pl

Pogorzelice [pɔɡɔʐɛˈlit͡sɛ] (German: Langeböse) is a village in the administrative district of Gmina Nowa Wieś Lęborska, within Lębork County, Pomeranian Voivodeship, in northern Poland.

== Transport ==
The S6 expressway passes directly to the north of Pogorzelice.

Exit 43 of the expressway provides for quick access to Lębork and to Słupsk.

Pogorzelice is served by Pogorzelice railway station on the Gdańsk-Szczecin railway line.

== History ==
For details of the history of the region, see History of Pomerania.
