= Kozielec, Świecie County =

Village in Kociewie

Kozielec
- Village
- Location within Poland
- Coordinates: 53°41′0″N 18°45′24″E
- Country: Poland
- Voivodeship: Kuyavian-Pomeranian
- County: Świecie
- Gmina: Nowe
- Population: 70

Kozielec [kɔˈʑɛlɛt͡s] is a village in the administrative district of Gmina Nowe, within Świecie County, Kuyavian-Pomeranian Voivodeship, in north-central Poland.
