= Głodowo, Świecie County =

Village in Kociewie

Głodowo
- Village
- Location within Poland
- Coordinates: 53°39′10″N 18°34′56″E
- Country: Poland
- Voivodeship: Kuyavian-Pomeranian
- County: Świecie
- Gmina: Nowe
- Population: 50

Głodowo [ɡwɔˈdɔvɔ] is a village in the administrative district of Gmina Nowe, within Świecie County, Kuyavian-Pomeranian Voivodeship, in north-central Poland.
