= Damnica =

- Village
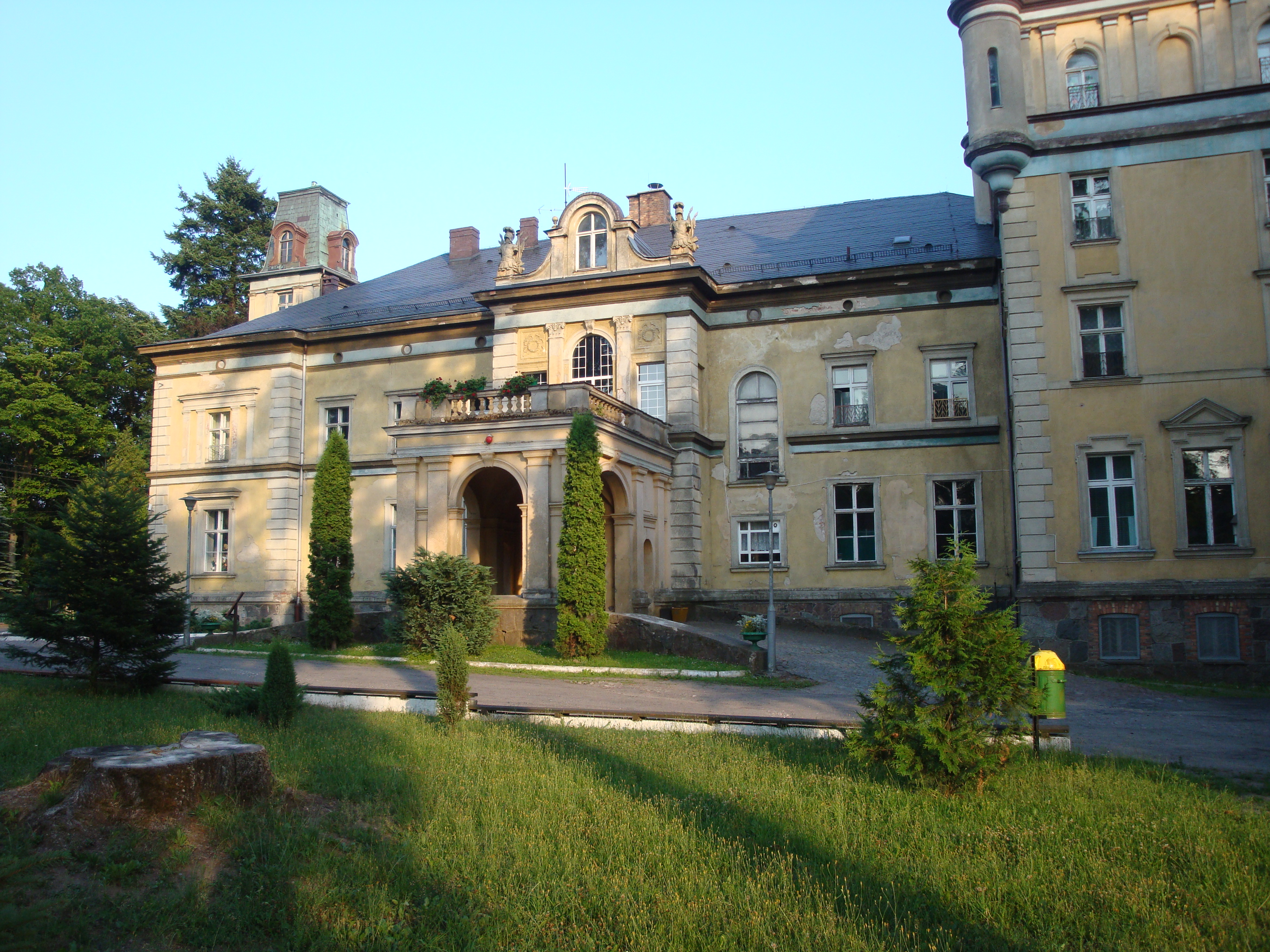
- Palace in Damnica

- Location within Poland
- Coordinates: 54°30′7″N 17°16′13″E
- Country: Poland
- Voivodeship: Pomeranian
- County: Słupsk
- Gmina: Damnica
- Population: 1,240

Damnica (Polish: [damˈɲit͡sa]; German: Hebrondamnitz) is a village in Słupsk County, Pomeranian Voivodeship, in northern Poland. It is the seat of the gmina (administrative district) called Gmina Damnica.
