= Pastwiska, Kuyavian-Pomeranian Voivodeship =

Village in Kociewie

Pastwiska
- Village
- Location within Poland
- Coordinates: 53°37′N 18°42′E
- Country: Poland
- Voivodeship: Kuyavian-Pomeranian
- County: Świecie
- Gmina: Nowe
- Population: 130

Pastwiska [pastˈfʲiska] is a very small settlement in the administrative district of Gmina Nowe, within Świecie County, Kuyavian-Pomeranian Voivodeship, in north-central Poland.
