= Gmina Nowe =

Gmina Nowe Nowe Commune
- Gmina
- Flag Coat of arms
- Interactive map of Gmina Nowe
- Coordinates (Nowe): 53°38′58″N 18°43′32″E
- Country: Poland
- Voivodeship: Kuyavian-Pomeranian
- County: Świecie
- Seat: Nowe

Area
  - Total: 106.36 km^{2} (41.07 sq mi)

Population (2006)
  - Total: 10,745
  - Density: 101.02/km^{2} (261.65/sq mi)
  - Urban: 6,252
  - Rural: 4,493
- Website: gminanowe.pl

Gmina Nowe is an urban-rural gmina (administrative district) in Świecie County, Kuyavian-Pomeranian Voivodeship, in north-central Poland. Its seat is the town of Nowe, which lies approximately 33 kilometres (21 mi) north-east of Świecie and 69 km (43 mi) north of Toruń.

The gmina covers an area of 106.36 square kilometres (41.1 sq mi), and as of 2006 its total population is 10,745 (out of which the population of Nowe amounts to 6,252, and the population of the rural part of the gmina is 4,493).

== Villages ==
Apart from the town of Nowe, Gmina Nowe contains the villages and settlements of Dolne Morgi, Głodowo, Kończyce, Kozielec, Milewo, Pastwiska, Piaski, Przyny, Twarda Góra, Zabijak and Zabudowania Gajewskie.

== Neighbouring gminas ==
Gmina Nowe is bordered by the gminas of Dragacz, Gniew, Grudziądz, Osiek, Sadlinki, Smętowo Graniczne and Warlubie.
