= Marcin Józefaciuk =

Polish politician

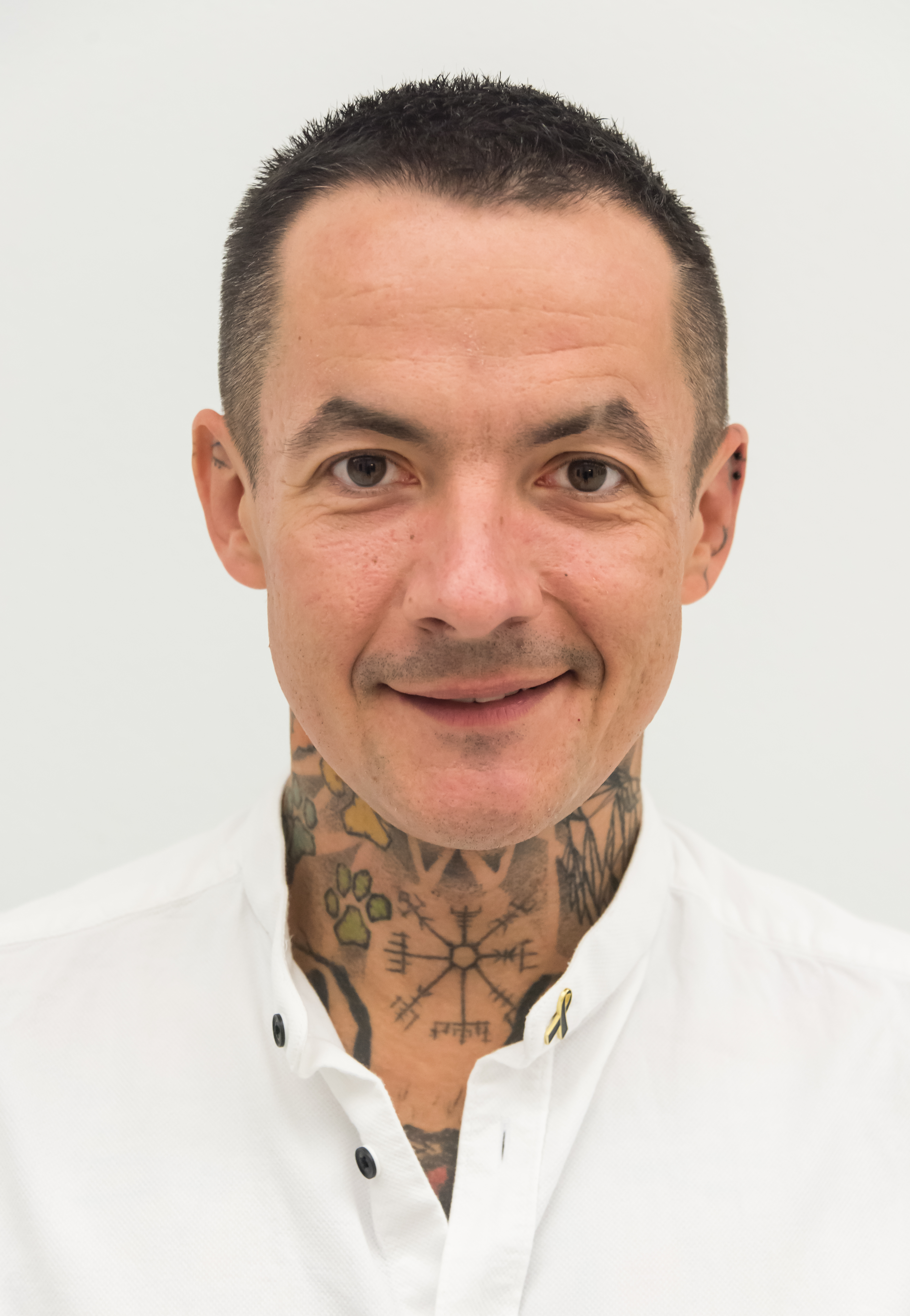
- Marcin Józefaciuk (2023)
- Born: 17 October 1982 (age 43); Łódź
- Education: Academy of Humanities and Economics in Łódź|Higher School of Humanities and Economics in Łódź
- Occupations: teacher, English philologist, TV presenter, politician
- Political party: Civic Platform

Marcin Józefaciuk (born 17 October 1982 in Łódź) is a Polish teacher, English philologist, television presenter, politician and ultramarathon runner, a member of parliament in the Sejm of the 10th term.

== Biography ==
=== Education and professional career ===
He grew up and lived in Łask. He moved to Łódź in the third year of high school. He graduated in English philology from the Higher School of Humanities and Economics in Łódź (master's degree in 2008). He completed postgraduate studies in teaching IT and physical education at the University of Computer Sciences and Skills in Łódź and in school management at the same academy

He worked at Public Middle School No. 6 in Łódź and XXX High School in Łódź, and then at the Department of Education of the Łódź City Hall. From 2017 to 2022, he served as the director of the Jan Kiliński Crafts School Complex in Łódź. In 2022, he became the vice principal of the same school. That same year, he joined the Creative School Director Academy at the Łódź Center for Teacher Training and Practical Education. He teaches seven subjects: English, vocational foreign language, physical education, physics, ethics, IT, and Polish in a preparatory class for students from Ukraine.

=== Social and political activity ===
He participated in a failed attempt to break a Guinness World Record, running over 680 km in seven days, simultaneously raising funds for the Great Orchestra of Christmas Charity. He also attempted a world record by running 305 km in 48 hours (supporting children with cancer). He participated in a 48-hour ultramarathon in Pabianice, a mountain run festival in Lądek-Zdrój, and the 900-km relay "Race Cancer Away for Kids". In March 2023, he became the host of the TVN program Teens Rule… the Budget to teach youth how to manage household finances.

In 2023, he ran in the 2023 Polish parliamentary election as an independent candidate from the tenth position on the Civic Coalition list in the Łódź constituency. He was elected to the Sejm of the 10th term, receiving 8,893 votes. Before the first Sejm session, he joined the Civic Platform. He sits on the Petitions Committee and the Education, Science and Youth Committee. He is also Vice-Chairman of the Parliamentary Group for LGBT+ Equality and the Parliamentary Group for Life and Family.

== Personal life ==
He is an openly gay man. He identifies as a neopagan and follower of Wicca

== Honors and awards ==
- "Heart to the Child" Medal (2013)
- Badge of Honour "For Merits for the City of Łódź" (2023)
- Jubilee medal for the 600th anniversary of Łódź (2023)
