= Paweł Rabiej =

Polish journalist, politician

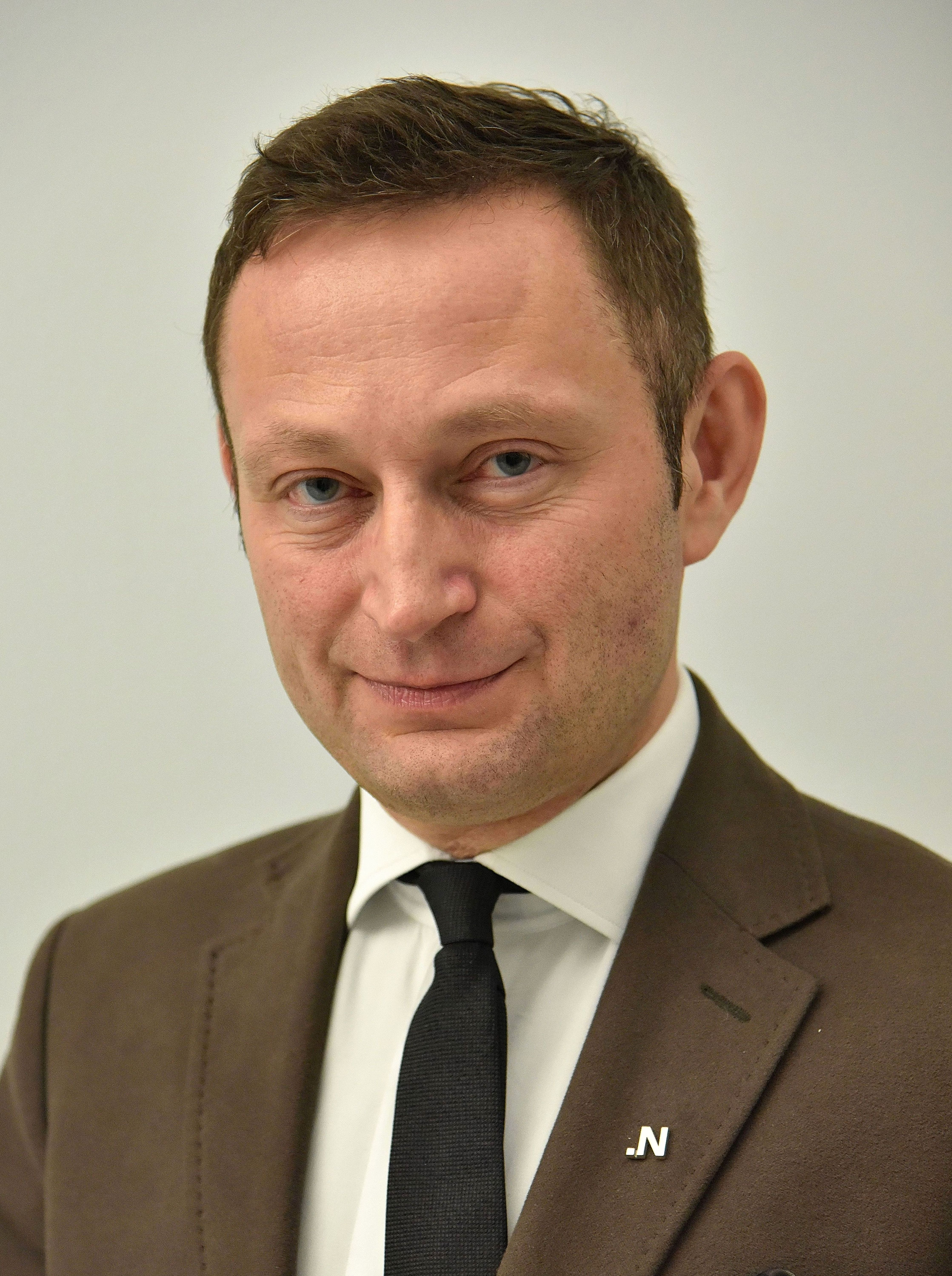
- Paweł Rabiej in 2016.

Deputy mayor of Warsaw
- In office 23 November 2018 – 3 November 2020

Personal details
- Born: 7 July 1971 (age 54) Puławy, Poland
- Party: Modern
- Education: University of Warsaw; Columbia University; Warsaw University of Technology Business School
- Occupation: Politician; Journalist

Paweł Mariusz Rabiej (Polish: [ˈpa.vɛw ˈma.rjuʂ ˈra.bjɛj]; born 7 July 1971) is a political and opinion journalist. He is one of the co-founders of the Modern centrist party, and was its spokesperson from 2016 to 2017. From 2018 to 2020 he was a deputy mayor of Warsaw, Poland.

== Biography ==
Paweł Rabiej was born on 7 July 1971 in Puławy, Poland. In 1995 he graduated from the Faculty of Polish Studies of the University of Warsaw. He had also done postgraduate studies at the Columbia University in New York City in 1998, and at the Warsaw University of Technology Business School in 2011.

In 1993 he took part in the election campaign of the Centre Agreement. In that year were also published two books co-writren by him with Inga Rosińska, titled Kim pan jest, panie Wachowski? and Droga cienia – Wachowski bez cenzury. He began his journalist career in 1991 working for the Polskie Radio Program III on the production of Zapraszamy do Trójki. He also wrote for news magazine Wprost, and from 1995 to 1997 was a journalist and economic section editor for the magazine Gazeta Bankowa.

From 1997 to 2000 was publisher and head editor of the magazine Kalejdoskop published by LOT Polish Airlines, and deputy chairperson of publishing matters and head editor in Business Press, and publisher of its Businessman Magazine. From 2000 to 2002 he was a director of a consortium consisting of Business Press, Onet.pl, Wydawnictwo Pascal, and Adam Mickiewicz Institute. It was formed on the commission from the Ministry of Foreign Affairs, to create an advertisement campaign, promoting Poland prior to its accession into the European Union. From 2003 to 2008, he was a development director of the Polish edition of Harvard Business Review magazine. He is also a published of magazine ThinkTank, and a member of the Professional Speakers of Poland Association, and the Polish Club of Business Council.

In 2015 he was one of the co-founders of the Modern centrist party. From November 2016 to January 2017 he was its spokesperson. On 3 June 2017 he was chosen by the party as its candidate in the upcoming elections for mayor of Warsaw. However, on 23 November 2017 he withdrew himself from the race, and endorsed Rafał Trzaskowski, candidate of the Civic Platform, with an agreement that he would become his deputy mayor. On 8 June 2017, he was appointed by the Sejm of Poland, as a member of the Commission of the Matters of Reprivatization of the Warsaw Real Estate. Until 16 December 2017, he was a board member of the Modern, and on that day, he became the chairperson of its board of political matters.

On 23 November 2018, he was appointed by the mayor of Warsaw, Rafał Trzaskowski, to the office of the deputy mayor, responsible for the city offices of directives, social help and projects, and healthcare. Rabiej was removed by him from the office on 3 November 2020, after, while being responsible for healthcare matters in the city, he left the country for an unplenned and unagreed vacation during the COVID-19 pandemic.

In May 2022 he became the chairperson of the Warsaw division of Modern.

In 2023, he unsuccessfully attempted to receive a mandate from the Civic Coalition, to run in the 2023 Polish parliamentary election.

== Private life ==
Rabiej is gay, and came out in 2016. He is in a relationship with journalist Michał Cessanis.
