= Pogorzelice railway station =

Railway station in Pogorzelice, Poland

Pogorzelice
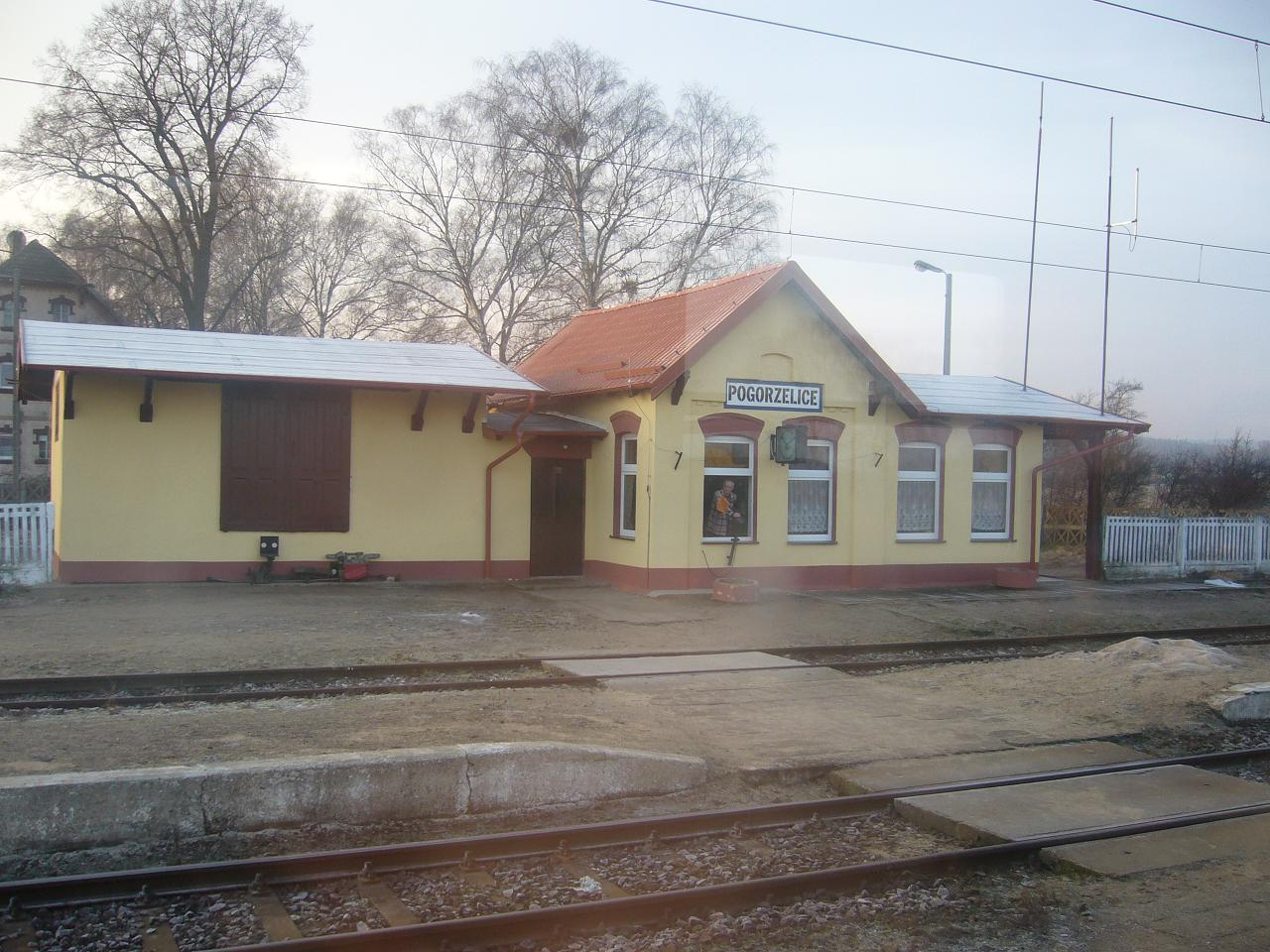

General information
- Location: Pogorzelice, Pomeranian Voivodeship, Poland
- Coordinates: 54.5036°N 17.6411°E
- Owner: Polskie Koleje Państwowe S.A.
- Line: 202: Gdańsk Główny–Stargard railway

Services
Preceding station	Polregio	Following station
Potęgowo towards Słupsk	PR	Leśnice towards Tczew
Potęgowo towards Słupsk	PR	Leśnice towards Malbork
Potęgowo towards Słupsk	PR	Leśnice towards Elbląg
Potęgowo towards Słupsk	PR	Leśnice towards Smętowo, Laskowice Pomorskie, or Bydgoszcz Główna
Potęgowo towards Słupsk	PR	Leśnice towards Gdynia Główna
Location

Pogorzelice is a PKP railway station in Pogorzelice (Pomeranian Voivodeship), Poland.

== Lines crossing the station ==
Start station	End station	Line type
Gdańsk Główny	Stargard Szczeciński	Passenger/Freight

== Train services ==
The station is served by the following services:

- Regional services (R) Tczew — Słupsk
- Regional services (R) Malbork — Słupsk
- Regional services (R) Elbląg — Słupsk
- Regional services (R) Słupsk — Bydgoszcz Główna
- Regional services (R) Słupsk — Gdynia Główna
