= Słupsk County =

Słupsk County Powiat słupski
- County
- Flag Coat of arms

- Division into gminas
- Coordinates (Słupsk): 54°27′57″N 17°1′45″E
- Country: Poland
- Voivodeship: Pomeranian
- Seat: Słupsk
- Gminas: Total 10 (incl. 1 urban): Ustka; Gmina Damnica; Gmina Dębnica Kaszubska; Gmina Główczyce; Gmina Kępice; Gmina Kobylnica; Gmina Potęgowo; Gmina Słupsk; Gmina Smołdzino; Gmina Ustka

Area
  - Total: 2,304 km^{2} (890 sq mi)

Population (2019)
  - Total: 98,793
  - Density: 42.88/km^{2} (111.1/sq mi)
  - Urban: 19,040
  - Rural: 79,753
- Car plates: GSL
- Website: www.powiat.slupsk.pl

Słupsk County (Polish: powiat słupski, Kashubian: stôłpsczi pòwiôt, stôłpsczi kréz) is a unit of territorial administration and local government (powiat) in Pomeranian Voivodeship, northern Poland, on the Baltic coast. It came into being on 1 January 1999, as a result of the Polish local government reforms passed in 1998. Its administrative seat is the city of Słupsk, although the city is not part of the county (it constitutes a separate city county). The only towns in Słupsk County are Ustka, a coastal resort 18 km (11 mi) north-west of Słupsk, and Kępice, 27 km (17 mi) south of Słupsk.

The county covers an area of 2,304 square kilometres (889.6 sq mi). As of 2019 its total population is 98,793, out of which the population of Ustka is 15,460, that of Kępice is 3,580, and the rural population is 79,753.

Słupsk County on a map of the counties of Pomeranian Voivodeship

Apart from the city of Słupsk, Słupsk County is also bordered by Lębork County to the east, Bytów County to the south-east, and Koszalin County and Sławno County to the west. It also borders the Baltic Sea to the north.

== Administrative divisions ==
The county is subdivided into 10 gminas (one urban, one urban-rural and eight rural). These are listed in the following table, in descending order of population.

Gmina	Type	Area (km^{2})	Population (2019)	Seat
Gmina Słupsk	rural	260.6	18,110	Słupsk *
Ustka	urban	10.1	15,460	
Gmina Kobylnica	rural	245.0	12,712	Kobylnica
Gmina Dębnica Kaszubska	rural	300.0	9,619	Dębnica Kaszubska
Gmina Kępice	urban-rural	293.4	9,122	Kępice
Gmina Główczyce	rural	323.8	9,042	Główczyce
Gmina Ustka	rural	218.1	8,335	Ustka *
Gmina Potęgowo	rural	227.9	6,944	Potęgowo
Gmina Damnica	rural	167.8	6,058	Damnica
Gmina Smołdzino	rural	257.2	3,391	Smołdzino
* seat not part of the gmina
