= Louis Iribarne =

Polish-English translator

Louis Michael Iribarne (September 1940 - 5 December 2020), of Basque extraction, was a Canadian translator of Polish literature into English, including works by Czesław Miłosz, Witold Gombrowicz, Stanisław Lem, Bruno Schulz, and Stanisław Ignacy Witkiewicz.

In the mid-1960s, at the University of California, Berkeley, he studied Polish literature with 1980 Nobel laureate Czesław Miłosz, participating in seminars on translation of Polish poetry.

Subsequently he taught Polish and Russian literature at the University of Toronto, retiring in 1998.

== Bibliography ==
- Louis Iribarne, "Babel's 'Red Cavalry' as a Baroque Novel," Contemporary Literature, vol. 14, no. 1 (winter, 1973), University of Wisconsin Press, pp. 58–77.
- Stanisław Lem, The Chain of Chance, translated from the Polish by Louis Iribarne, Evanston, Illinois, Northwestern University Press, 1975.
- Czesław Miłosz, The Issa Valley, translated from the Polish by Louis Iribarne, New York, Farrar Straus Giroux,1981.
- Stanisław Ignacy Witkiewicz, Insatiability, translated by Louis Iribarne, Evanston, Illinois, Northwestern University Press, 1996.
- Czesław Miłosz, The Land of Ulro, translated by Louis Iribarne, Farrar, Straus and Giroux Paperbacks, May 2000.

== See also ==
- Richard Lourie
