= Eugeniusz Ignacy Romer =

Polish landowner and community leader in Lithuania (1871–1943)

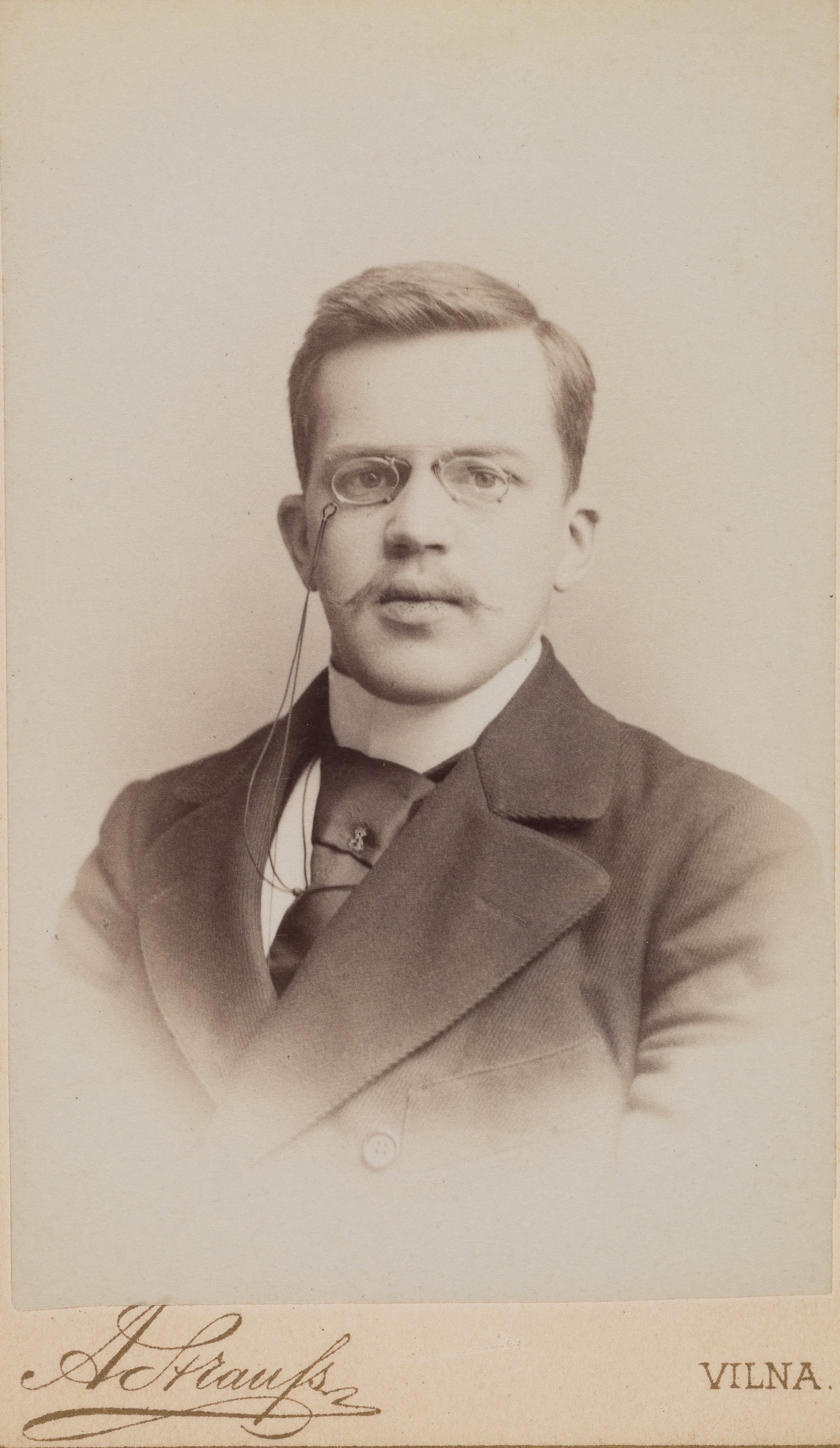
- Born: 4 October 1871; Tytuvėnai, Russian Empire
- Died: 2 May 1943 (aged 71); Kuybyshev, Soviet Union
- Occupations: Landowner, community leader, diarist
- Spouse: Zofia Dembowska (m. 1911)
- Children: 5

Eugeniusz Ignacy Romer (4 October 1871 – 2 May 1943), was a Polish landowner, community leader and diarist in Lithuania. Associated with the Polish National Democratic movement, he became a leading representative of the Polish minority in interwar Lithuania. His diaries document the First World War, the Russian Revolution and the emergence of independent Lithuania. During the Second World War, he was deported to the Soviet Union, where he died in Kuybyshev.

== Biography ==
Cytowiany Manor

Romer was born at the family estate of Cytowiany, now Tytuvėnai, in Samogitia. His parents were Izydor Romer and Celina, née Przeciszewska. Izydor Romer was born in exile after his father, Edward Jan Römer, and his family were sentenced to exile for Edward’s involvement in Szymon Konarski’s conspiracy, an underground movement seeking to restore Polish independence. Eugeniusz initially received his education at home. In 1886 he entered a gymnasium in Wilno, but was expelled for speaking Polish. He completed his secondary education in Riga in 1892. He subsequently studied economics in Berlin and continued his studies in Munich, obtaining a doctorate in 1897. His dissertation, Beiträge zu Litauens Wirtschaftsgeschichte, concerned Lithuanian economic history.

Romer owned the estates of Cytowiany, Pogryżów, and Barszczyce, which combined covered area of 7,500 ha. He was active in the Polish Youth Association "Zet" and the National League. A pioneer of agricultural cooperation in Lithuania, he helped establish the agricultural society in Raseiniai and became its president in 1909. He founded the Biruta dairy cooperative; the agricultural society promoted improved farming through exhibitions, courses and local agricultural associations.

During the First World War, Romer and his family left Lithuania. From 15 April 1915 to 3 March 1918, they stayed with Stanisław Hłasko in the Polotsk region, and subsequently with Bolesław Korsak in the Vitebsk region. They returned to Cytowiany in 1919. Lithuania's subsequent land reform reduced his holdings to an estate of 80 hectares.

Romer became president of the Polish Agricultural Producers' Union and the Polish Bank in Kaunas. He also served as chairman of the Central Electoral Committee, worked for the “Pochodnia” Cultural Society, and contributed to Dzień Kowieński and Chata Rodzinna. He maintained contacts with Polish officials, including Józef Piłsudski and Aleksander Prystor, and helped channel Polish government subsidies to Polish organisations in Lithuania through banks in Gdańsk.

In 1928 he participated in the formation of the Polish Committee, intended to represent and coordinate Polish organisations in Lithuania. The Lithuanian authorities refused to register it, but tolerated its informal operation. Romer became its effective leader. The committee coordinated organisational work, distributed subsidies and mediated disputes. Younger activists criticised its conservative leadership, known as the Olimp (Olympus), for its undemocratic character.

The resulting conflict contributed to a reorganisation in 1935 under Tadeusz Katelbach, the Polish government's representative. A compromise retained Romer at the head of a new committee and its political and press commission, while Katelbach exercised overall supervision. Separate commissions dealt with economic and cultural affairs.

After the outbreak of the Second World War, Romer assisted Polish refugees. In January 1941 he offered his services to the Kaunas subdistrict of the Union of Armed Struggle as an adviser on Polish–Lithuanian relations.

In 1941 Soviet authorities deported Romer and his wife to Syktyvkar in the Komi Autonomous Soviet Socialist Republic. (Note: Sources differ on the date. Szymon Rudnicki gives 16 April 1941; Mieczysław Jackiewicz gives 16 June 1941.) His wife's employment included painting at a toy factory. The couple obtained permission to move to Kuybyshev in 1942. The move was facilitated by his cousin, the diplomat Tadeusz Romer. Eugeniusz Romer died there on 2 May 1943. Jackiewicz identifies the cause of death as typhoid fever. A commemorative plaque is located in St Martin’s Church in Warsaw.

== Family ==
On 19 July 1911 Romer married the painter Zofia Dembowska at St George's Church in Vilnius. They had three daughters and two sons. Their children were Zofia, Roch Edward, Eugenia, Helena and Andrzej Tadeusz. After his death, Zofia left the Soviet Union with the Polish embassy and eventually settled in Canada.

== Diaries and historical writings ==
Romer's diary, kept systematically from July 1914, records wartime society in the Russian Empire, the revolution, German occupation and the formation of the Lithuanian state. The published volumes covering 1914–1923 were edited by historian Piotr Łossowski.

He also researched his family's history. His Monografia rodu Römerów na Inflantach i Litwie drew on family archives and circulated posthumously in a duplicated typescript edition prepared by Tadeusz Romer in 1947. A Polish–Lithuanian edition, edited by Jolanta Širkaitė, appeared in Vilnius in 2009. A further collection of his memoirs, Z dziejów Polaków na Litwie: Wspomnienia 1871–1939, was published in Warsaw in 2014.

=== Selected publications ===
- Beiträge zu Litauens Wirtschaftsgeschichte. Munich, 1897. Doctoral dissertation.
- Dziennik. Edited by Piotr Łossowski. Vol. 1: 1914–1918; vol. 2: 1919–1923. Warsaw: Interlibro, 1995.</ref name="abs">
- Livonijos ir Lietuvos Römerių giminės istorija / Monografia rodu Römerów na Inflantach i Litwie. Edited by Jolanta Širkaitė; Lithuanian translation by Tamara Bairašauskaitė and Jolanta Širkaitė. Vilnius: Kultūros, filosofijos ir meno institutas, 2009. ISBN 978-9955-868-19-4.
- Z dziejów Polaków na Litwie: Wspomnienia 1871–1939. Edited by Maria Rodowicz [Marek P. Prokop]. Warsaw: Multiart Antoni Rodowicz, 2014. ISBN 978-83-938484-0-9.

== Bibliography ==
- Buchowski, Krzysztof (1999). Polacy w niepodległym państwie litewskim 1918–1940 (PDF) (in Polish). Białystok. ISBN 83-87881-06-6.
- Jackiewicz, Mieczysław (2002). "Romer Eugeniusz". Polacy na Litwie 1918–2000: Słownik biograficzny (PDF) (in Polish). Warsaw: Wydawnictwo Andrzej Frukacz, Ex Libris – Galeria Polskiej Książki. pp. 168–170. ISBN 83-88455-72-9.
- Jeziorski, Paweł A. (2015). "Eugenijus Romeris [Eugeniusz Romer], Livonijos ir Lietuvos Römerių giminės istorija. Monografia rodu Römerów na Inflantach i Litwie" (PDF). Zapiski Historyczne (in Polish). 80 (2): 182–190. doi:10.15762/ZH.2015.26.
- Rudnicki, Szymon (1988–1989). "Romer Eugeniusz Ignacy Mateusz Hieronim". Polski słownik biograficzny (in Polish). Vol. 31. pp. 645–646.
