= Słupsk Castle =

Pomeranian Dukes' Castle
- Zamek Książąt Pomorskich (Polish)
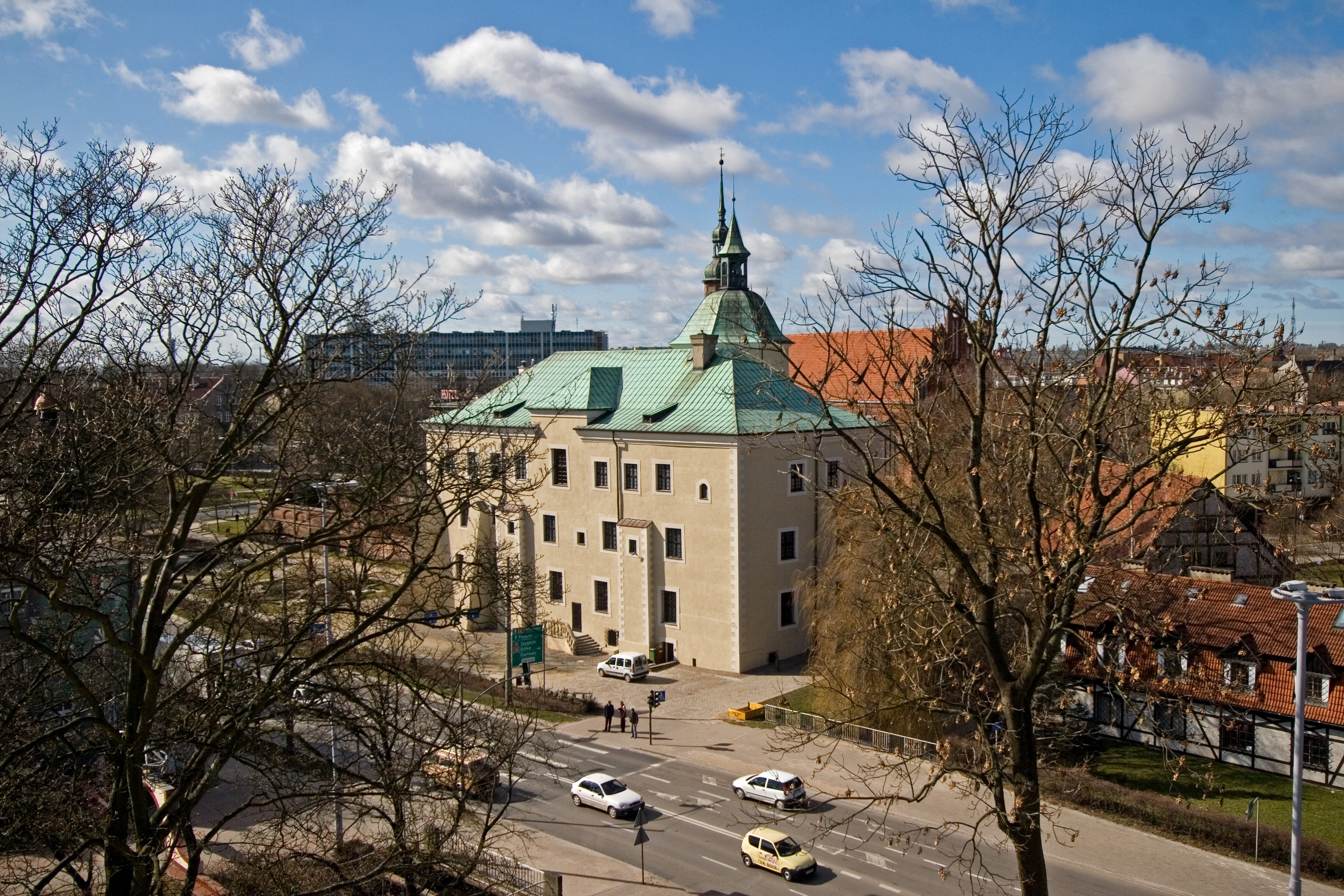
- Pomeranian Dukes' Castle

- Location of the Pomeranian Dukes' Castle in Poland
- 54°27′53″N 17°02′03″E
- Location: Słupsk, Pomeranian Voivodeship, Poland

History
- Built: 1507
- Rebuilt: 1580-87

Site notes
- Architectural style: Renaissance

The Pomeranian Dukes' Castle (Polish: Zamek Książąt Pomorskich) is a Renaissance castle located in Słupsk, Poland.

== History ==
Built in 1507 during the reign of Bogislaw X in a Gothic architectural style. Between 1580 and 1587, rebuilt as a two-storey Renaissance building, with large windows and a decorated tower. The castle is located by the river Słupia, by a distinctive Medieval Słupsk gord. Nearby, is the location of the castle mill. In the sixteenth and seventeenth-century the castle served as the residence of the Pomeranian Dukes, the House of Griffins. The German lordship over the territory (from 1653) led to the decline of the residence. In the second half of the eighteenth century, the castle was transformed into military barracks. After a fire in 1821, the residence was transformed to wheat granaries. After World War II, the castle was greatly renovated. Presently, it houses the Museum of Middle Pomerania.
