= Nina Polan =

Polish actress and theatre director

Nina Polan Gold Gloria Artis Medal Order of Merit of the Republic of Poland
- Born: Janina Katelbach-Starzyńska; November 30, 1927; Berlin, Germany
- Died: February 16, 2014 (aged 86); New York City, U.S.
- Education: Royal Academy of Dramatic Art
- Occupations: Actress, singer, director
- Years active: 1954–2014
- Website: poltheatreinst.com

Nina Polan (born Janina Katelbach; November 30, 1927 – February 16, 2014) was a Polish actress and theatre director active in the United States.

Since 1984 Nina Polan was executive and artistic director of the Polish Theatre Institute in America.

She was a daughter of Polish politician Tadeusz Katelbach (1897–1977).

== Filmography ==
- 1982: Sophie's Choice as Woman in English Class
- 1999: Fever as Polish Women Witness
- 2003: Love & Stuff as Mrs. Galway
- 2005: Solidarity as Meat Shop Babushka
- 2010: Occupant as Lily Wainwright
- 2014: Wolfenstein: The New Order as Olenka Targonski
- 2014: A Walk Among the Tombstones as Old Woman

== Awards and decorations ==
- Knight's Cross of the Order of Merit of the Republic of Poland
- Silver Medal of the "Wspolnota Polska" Association
- Golden Medal for Merit to Culture – Gloria Artis
