= Zofia Romer =

Polish painter

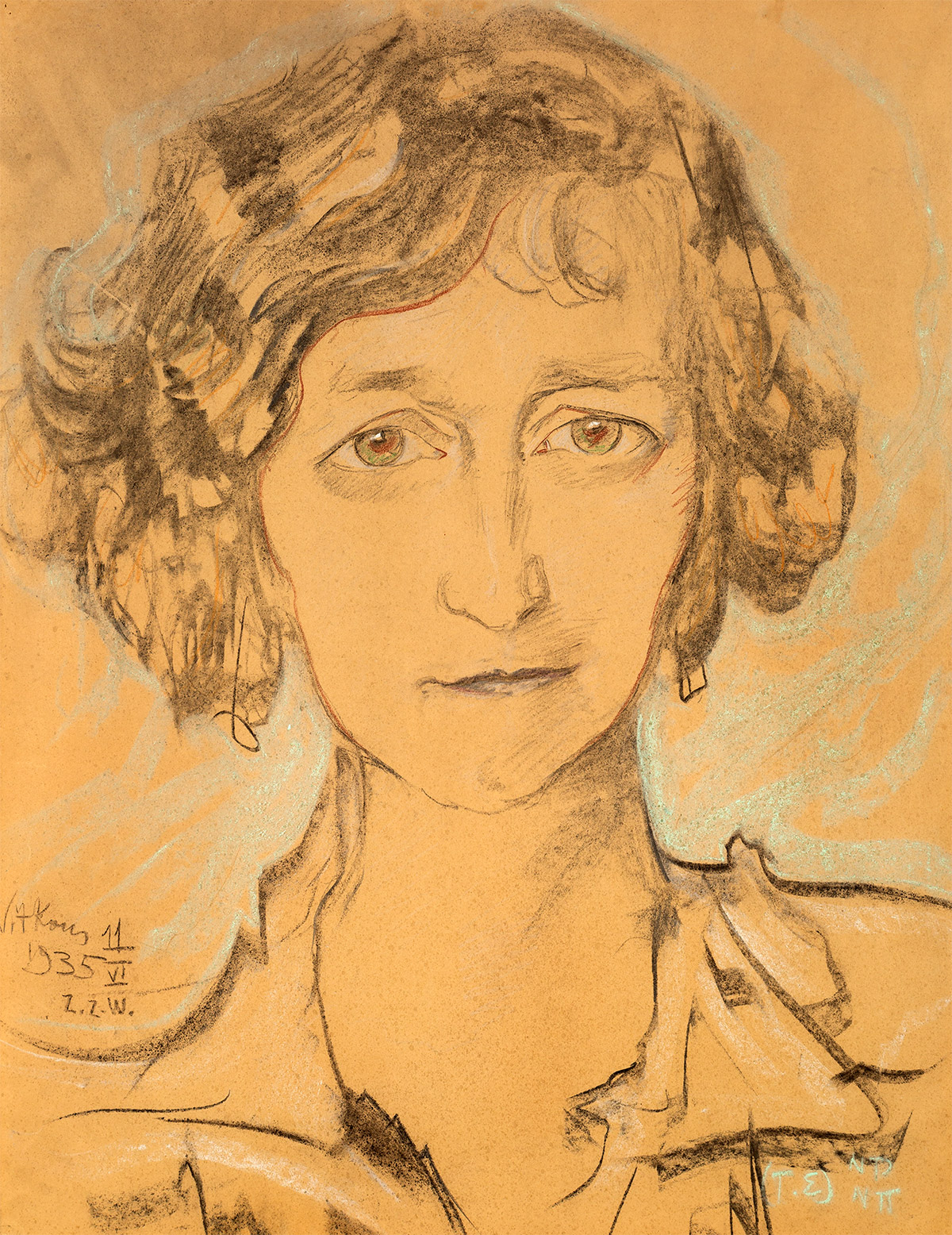
- 1935 portrait
- Born: Zofia Dembowska; February 16, 1885; Dorpat, Governorate of Livonia, Russian Empire
- Died: August 23, 1972 (aged 87); Montreal, Canada

Zofia Romer née Dembowska (Lithuanian: Sofija Romerienė; February 16, 1885 – August 23, 1972) was a Polish-Lithuanian painter. She was born in 1885 in Dorpat (now Tartu, Estonia) to well-known physician Tadeusz Dembowski and his wife Matylda. She grew up in Lithuania and Poland studying under various painters.

== Education ==
In Lithuania, she studied painting first under Ivan Trutnev in Vilnius and subsequently under Roth and Shimon Holoszy in Kraków, Poland and Munich, Germany. In 1903 and 1904, she continued her studies in Paris with the well-known portrait painter Jacques-Émile Blanche and the historical painter Luc-Olivier Merson. She completed her formal artistic education back in Kraków with Józef Siedlecki at the Baraniecki Museum.

== Marriage and career ==
As a young woman she was romantically linked with Bronisław Malinowski and Stanisław Ignacy Witkiewicz.

In 1911 she married Eugeniusz Romer, a wealthy and influential Polish landowner in Lithuania. She played a significant role in the artistic heritage of Lithuania. During a prolific artistic career spanning almost 70 years and encompassing a variety of media, she produced about 5,000 works, of which at least 1,200 are catalogued. From 1943 onward she earned her living as a portrait painter. As a result of her displacement from her home during World War II, in the second half of her life she lived and created in such diverse places as Russia, Tehran, Cairo, London, the United States, and Montreal, Canada, where she died in 1972.

She had five children: Zofia, Roch Edward, Eugenia, Andrzej Tadeusz, and Hela. Her youngest son Andrzej devoted his later life to preserving his mother's legacy, artistic achievements and publishing the memoirs of both of his parents. Her work hangs in the collections of many museums in Europe including the state museums of Kaunas, Šiauliai, Telšiai, Kelmė, and Vilnius, and the National Museum in Warsaw, as well as numerous private collections. Her works have been exhibited in London, Warsaw, Montreal, Melbourne, Cairo, Vilnius, and Brussels. In 1992 a catalogue of her known work was published in connection with a multiple museum exhibition of her work.
