= Tony Wood (historian) =

British-Mexican political writer (born 1976)

Tony Wood (born 1976) is a British-Mexican political writer on Russia.

His 2018 book, Russia Without Putin: Money, Power and the Myths of the New Cold War, has been described by U.S. Russia policy expert Richard Lourie as a "maverick book," used "not to build a case against Putin, nor to forecast Russia's fate after his departure", but rather as a "battle cry of the opposition" against a media and public that is 'overly fixated' on the man. Wood "refutes the idea that today’s standoff is a new Cold War: it lacks any clear ideological dimension," according to Maria Lipman's review, and furthermore, "the kind of capitalism found in Russia today is directly descended from the postcommunist order installed by Putin’s predecessor, Boris Yeltsin. Putin has just consolidated and prolonged Yeltsin’s regime", and the "system will outlast him."

== Published works ==
- Chechnya: The Case for Independence (2007)
- Wood, Tony (2018). Russia Without Putin: Money, Power and the Myths of the New Cold War. ISBN 978-1788731249.
- Wood, Tony. NYU Jordan Center Lecture on "Russia Without Putin: Money, Power and the Myths of the New Cold War" (lecture introduction to his book).
