= Richard Lourie =

American historian

Richard Lourie (born 1940) is an American historian and foreign-policy expert on Russia–United States relations. He is known for research on USSR and USA policy changes over time (1960-1990).

== Life ==
In the mid-1960s, at the University of California, Berkeley, Richard Lourie studied Polish literature with 1980 Nobel laureate Czesław Miłosz, participating in seminars on translation of Polish poetry.

As a historian and foreign-policy expert on Russia–United States relations, Lourie consulted for Hillary Clinton in her failed 2008 presidential run, and has served as Mikhail Gorbachev's translator.

Lourie has written a fictional autobiography of Joseph Stalin and a biography of Andrei Sakharov.

He has written a prognosticative biography, Putin: His Downfall and Russia's Coming Crash, which explores the education and ascent of Putin during the dissolution of the USSR and his career as Russia's autocrat in order to estimate his probable future moves, while diagnosing Russia's spiritual ills, "narcissistic injuries", and "utter dependence on the ongoing will to power."

Lourie has translated over 30 books and has published articles and reviews in mainstream US media.

== Select bibliography ==
- Janusz Korczak (1986). King Matt the First. Translated by Richard Lourie. United States: Farrar, Straus and Giroux. ISBN 0-374-34139-7. introduction by Bruno Bettelheim
- Dobroszycki, Lucjan, ed. (1987) [1984]. The Chronicle of the Łódź Ghetto, 1941–1944. Translated by Richard Lourie; Joachim Neugroschel; et al. Yale University Press. Abridged edition, Hardcover. ISBN 978-0-300-03924-5 – via Google Books. ISBN 0-300-03208-0; Paperback, 1987.
- Lourie, Richard (1991). Russia Speaks: An Oral History from the Revolution to the Present. HarperCollins. Russian All-Military Union § cite ref-9
- Lourie, Richard (1 October 2000). The Autobiography of Joseph Stalin: A Novel. Da Capo Press. ISBN 978-0306809972.
- Lourie, Richard (2002). Sakharov. A Biography. Brandeis University Press. ISBN 978-1-5846-5207-6.
- Lourie, Richard (2017). Putin: His Downfall and Russia's Coming Crash. St. Martin's Press. ISBN 978-0-312-53808-8.
- Lourie, Richard (29 January 2019). "Out of the Picture: On Tony Wood's "Russia Without Putin: Money, Power and the Myths of the New Cold War"". LA Review of Books. See also: Tony Wood (historian)
- "Putin's bridge over troubled waters".
- "Kazakhstan May Be the Next Ukraine".

== See also ==
- Louis Iribarne
