= Insatiability =

1927 novel by Stanisław Ignacy Witkiewicz

Nienasycenie
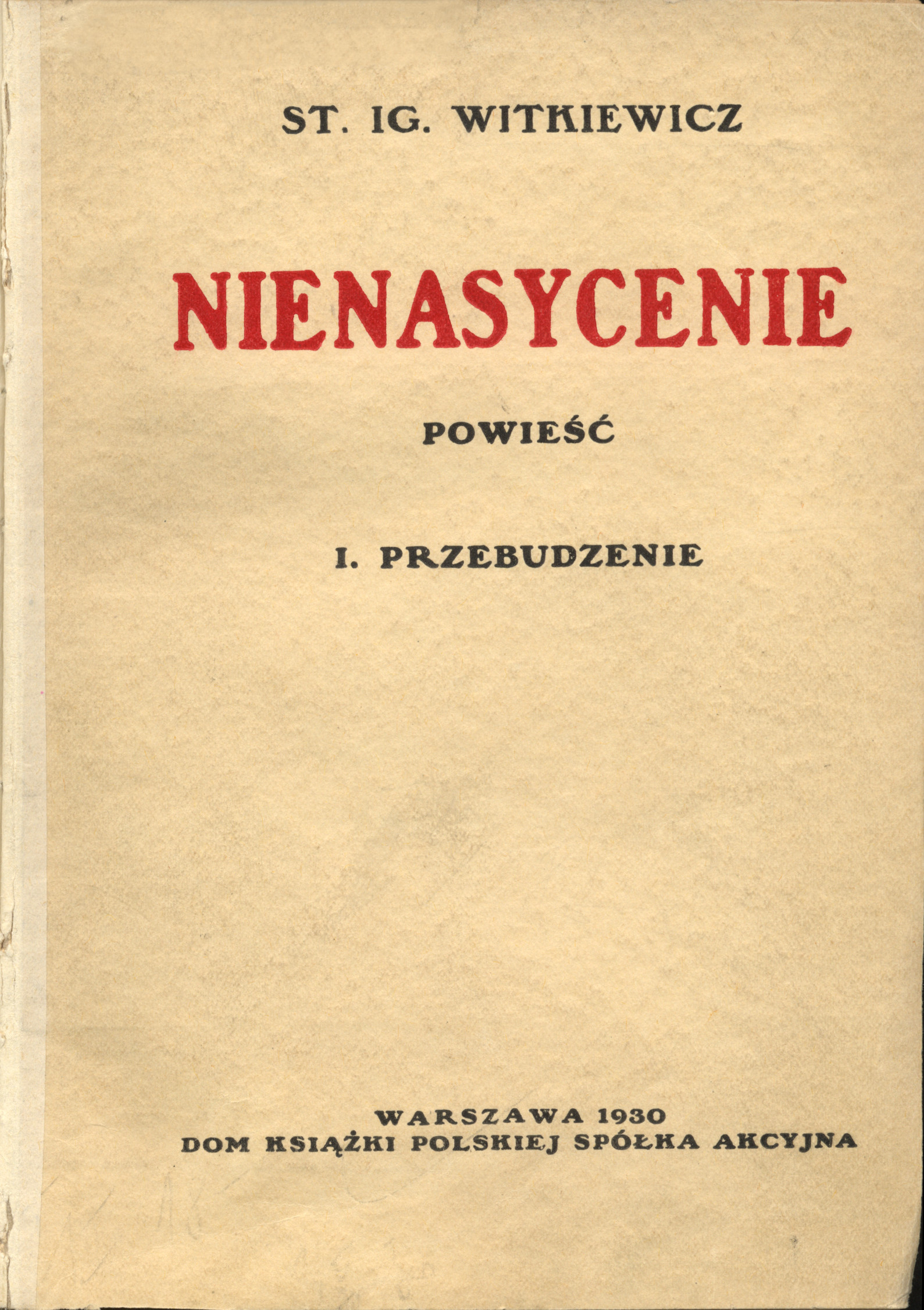
- First edition front cover of Nienasycenie; Part one: "Przebudzenie"
- Author: Stanisław Ignacy Witkiewicz
- Translator: Louis Iribarne
- Genre: Novel
- Publisher: Dom Książki Polskiej
- Publication date: 1930
- Publication place: Poland
- English publication date: 1977
- Media type: Print (Hardcover)

Insatiability (Polish: Nienasycenie) is a speculative fiction novel by the Polish writer, dramatist, philosopher, painter and photographer, Stanisław Ignacy Witkiewicz (Witkacy). Nienasycenie was written in 1927 and was first published in 1930. It is Witkiewicz's third novel, considered by some to be his best. The novel consists of two parts: Przebudzenie (Awakening) and Obłęd (The madness).

== Summary ==
The novel takes place in the future, circa 2000. Following a battle, modeled after the Bolshevik revolution, Poland is overrun by the army of the last and final Mongol conquest. The nation becomes enslaved to the Chinese leader Murti Bing. His emissaries give everyone a special pill called DAVAMESK B 2 which takes away their abilities to think and to mentally resist. East and West become one, in faceless misery fueled by sexual instincts.

Witkiewicz's Insatiability combines chaotic action with deep philosophical and political discussion, and predicts many of the events and political outcomes of the subsequent years, specifically, the invasion of Poland, the postwar foreign domination as well as the totalitarian mind control exerted, first by the Germans, and then by the Soviet Union on Polish life and art.

Life was rocking back and forth on a crest like a seesaw. On one side one could see sunny valleys of normality and great numbers of delightful little nooks to curl up in; on the other, there loomed the murky gorges and chasms of madness, smoking with thick gases and glowing with molten lava—a valle inferno, a kingdom of eternal tortures and insufferable pangs of conscience. — Stanisław Ignacy Witkiewicz

=== Characters ===
- Genezip (Zip) Kapen – The protagonist of the story. Zip is nineteen and has recently graduated from school. The book opens with Zip contemplating the previous night's events, starting with his visit to the residence of Princess di Ticonderoga.
- Papa Kapen – Zip's father. They don't have a very strong relationship, but make peace on his deathbed, becoming friends of sorts. Zip's father is also the reason for his entry into the army, when he was lying in the hospital bed he wrote a letter to his friend, recommending Zip to be the general's aide.
- Princess Irina Vsevolodovna di Ticonderoga –
- Putricides Tenzer – A composer and friend of Princess di Ticonderoga. Tenzer specializes in atonal and unstructured music, and is also a brutal critic of art and philosophy. He is a hunchback and has a deformed leg because of a bone disease. He is married with two children, but is occasionally unfaithful and often flirts with the Princess. His wife is a mountain woman that he had married when he was young for some money and a chalet, though at the time he found her somewhat attractive as well. "To be born a hunchback in Poland is bad luck; to be born an artist in addition the worst luck of all."
- Sturfan Abnol – An ex-lover of the princess. Abnol is a novelist and eventually becomes romantically involved with Zip's sister.
- Prince Basil Ostrogski – Another ex-lover of the Princess. He is a beginner neo-Catholic.
- Afanasol Benz – An old friend of Prince Basil's. He used to be rich, but after he lost his estate in Russia he created his own form of logic, which no one other than him can understand.
- Toldzio – Zip's cousin.
- Erasmus Kotzmolochowicz – The legendary quartermaster general of the Polish Army. Kotzmolochowicz is seen by most of the world as the only force that could possibly stop the "mobile Chinese Wall" that looms over Europe. Very little is known about him, which is later found out to be intentional; he doesn't even allow portraits of himself so that he cannot be caricatured.

== Influence ==
Stanisław I. Witkiewicz's's novel Insatiability was considered by Czesław Miłosz in his The Captive Mind: "Chapter I: The Pill of Murti-Bing" discusses Insatiability's DAVAMESK B 2 pills, which deaden the intellect and soul, like Marxism-Leninism according to Miłosz.

== Translation into English ==
S. I. Witkiewicz's novel 'Insatiability' was translated into English in 1977.
