= Velyki Ozera =

Village in Ukraine

Coordinates: 51.59°N 26.96°E

Velyki Ozera (Ukrainian: Великі Озера; Polish: Jeziory) is a village in the Polesia region of Ukraine. Jeziory is located in the Rivne Oblast in Sarny Raion, but was formerly administered within Dubrovytsia Raion. It lies on the banks of the Lwa River. Until 1945, it was located in Poland, within the Polesie Voivodeship of Powiat Piński.

On September 18, 1939, upon the Soviet invasion of Poland, the playwright Stanisław Ignacy Witkiewicz committed suicide while staying in the village. He was buried in the village's cemetery.
