= Museum of Middle Pomerania =

Museum in Poland

- Muzeum Pomorza Środkowego

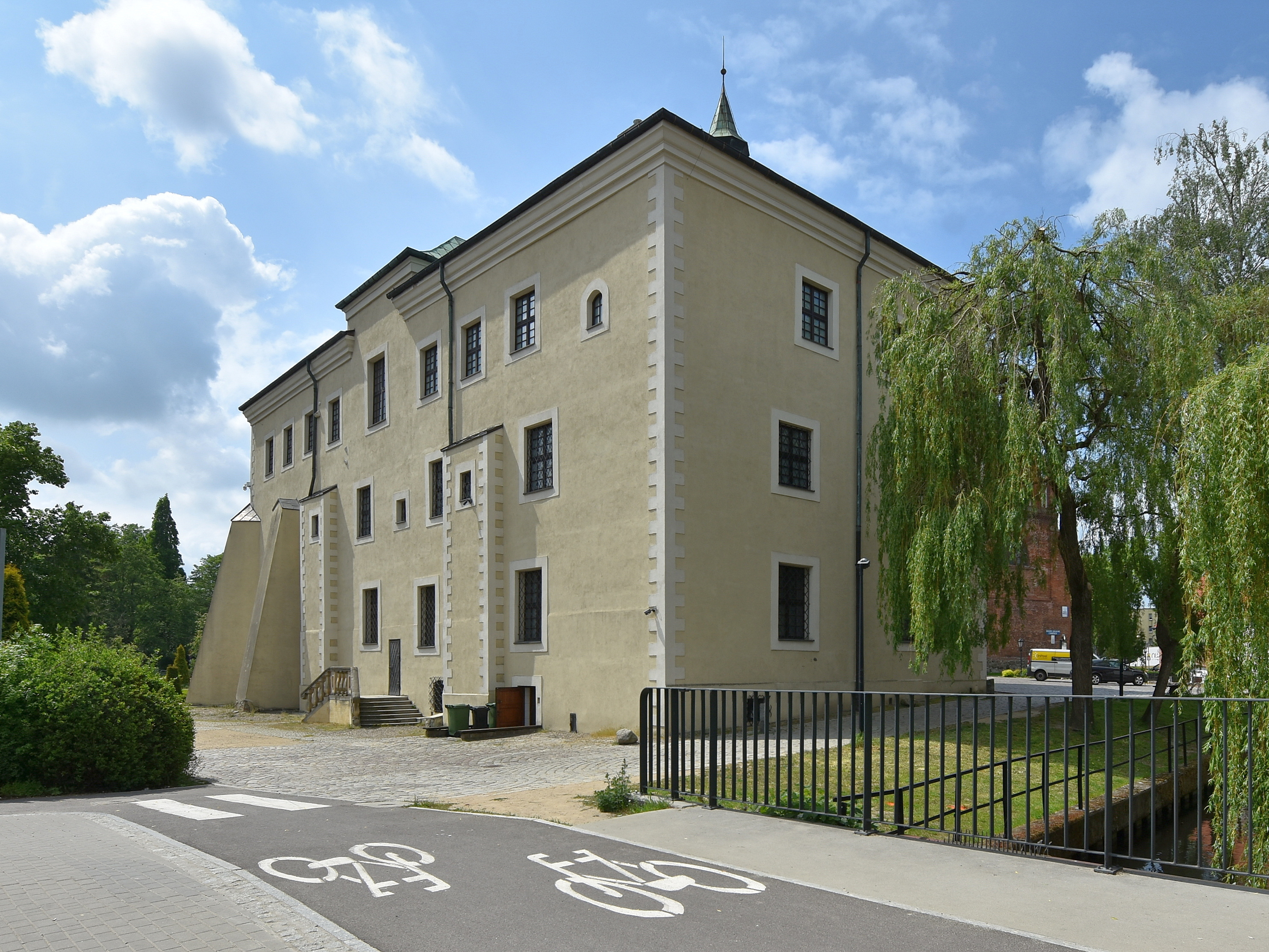
- Former name: Stolper Heimatmuseum
- Established: 1924
- Location: Słupsk Castle
- Type: Local museum
- Director: Marzenna Mazur
- Curator: Mikołaj Radomski
- Public transit access: Słupsk railway station
- Website: muzeum.slupsk.pl

The Museum of Middle Pomerania (Polish: Muzeum Pomorza Środkowego, MPŚ) is a museum of Middle Pomerania in the town of Słupsk, Poland.

== History ==
The origins of the museum date back to 1910 when a local history society of Farther Pomerania donated their collection to the town on the anniversary of its founding under the Lübeck law. Based on these objects, the Stolper Heimatmuseum was opened during the Weimar Republic as a local museum of Köslin in 1924. Following World War II the museum was reopened on May Day 1948, despite an estimated 90% of the pre-war museum's collection having been lost. The museum moved to its current site in Słupsk Castle in 1965.

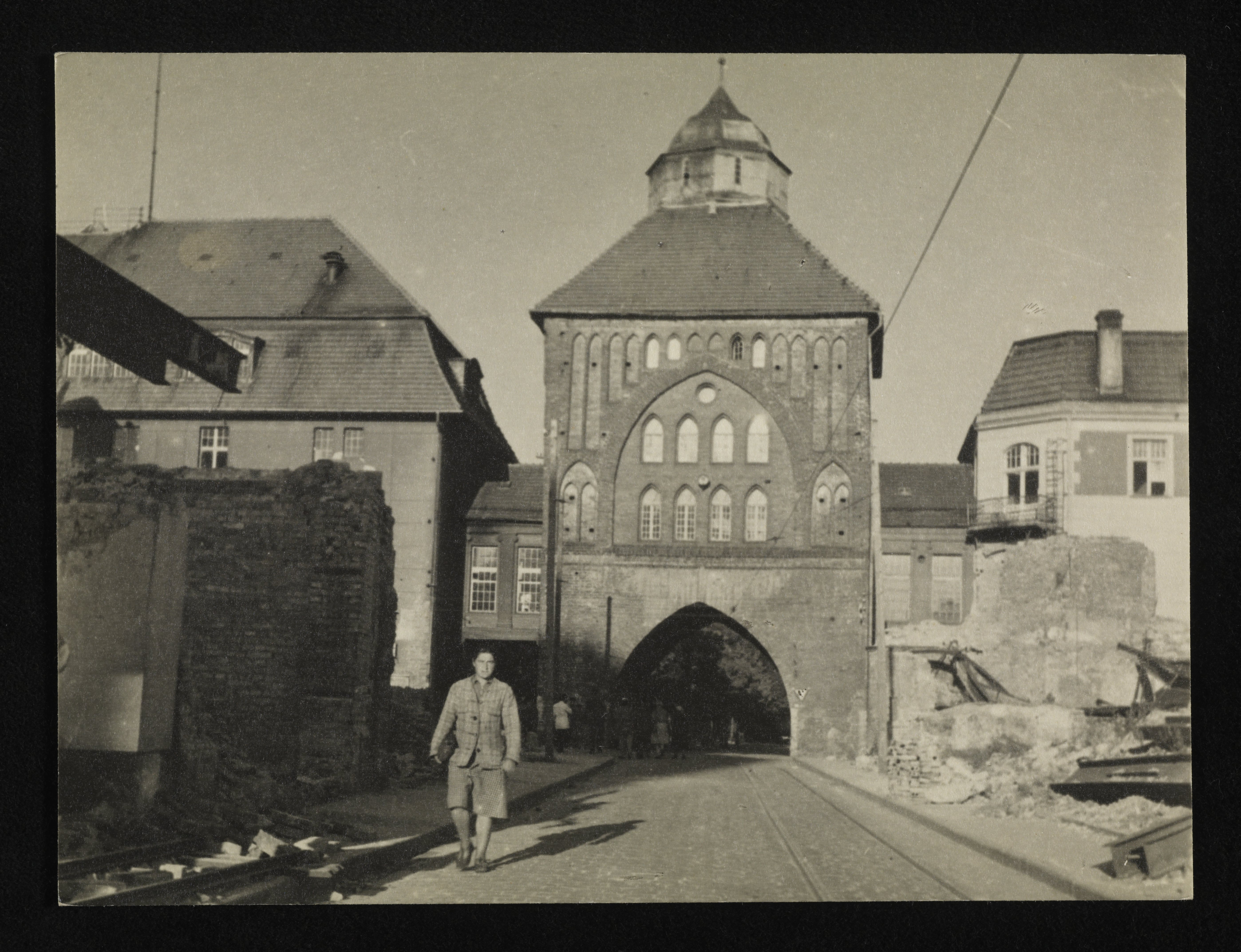
A photographic image by Jan Bułhak of the museum building, 1949. From the collections of the National Library

== Collections ==
The MPŚ collections constitute three subject areas of contemporary art, ethnography and history. While the museum inherited some of its collections from its predecessor, the majority of its archival collections were collected during the 1960s from the area of the Koszalin Voivodeship. The MPŚ also has a large collection of objects related to the artist Witkacy.

== Sites ==
In 2017 the MPŚ began restoration work on an historic granary adjacent to its site at Słupsk Castle. The European Regional Development Fund contributed €2,210,576 to the project, which was designed to house the arts collections of the museum.

== Exhibitions ==
In 2014 the museum hosted a temporary exhibit of work by the artist Witkacy. In the same year the museum also put on an exhibition of art and technology which featured the works of Magdalena Abakanowicz, Otto Freundlich, Wojciech Kossak, Jacek Malczewski, Jan Matejko, Piotr Stachiewicz, and Max Pechstein. The exhibition also featured technological narratives related to the town told through the stories of the explorers Mirosław Hermaszewski and Umberto Nobile. In 2018 the museum undertook an ethnobotanical project collecting local knowledge of medicinal and herbal plants that were grown on allotments. The following year an open air exhibition was opened in Swołowo based on the research. In 2020 the MPŚ put on an exhibition about the regional social history of cutlery across the 17th-21st centuries.
