= Stanisław Ignacy Witkiewicz =

Polish writer and artist (1885–1939)

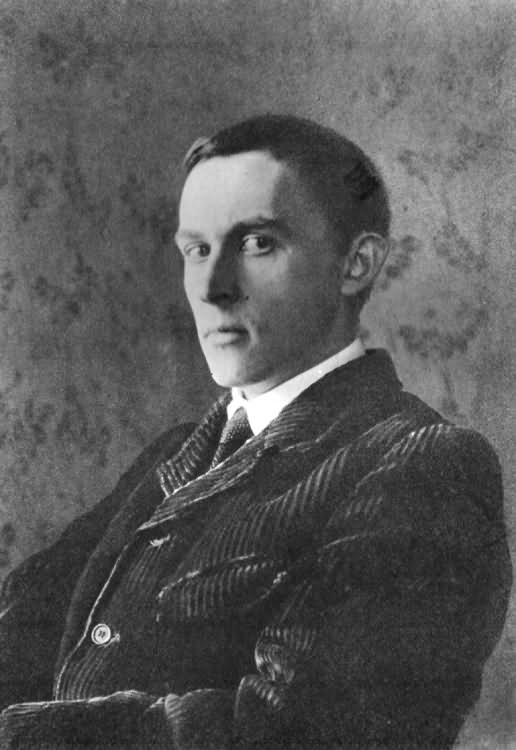
- Stanisław Ignacy Witkiewicz, ca 1912
- Born: 24 February 1885; Warsaw, Congress Poland, Russian Empire
- Died: 18 September 1939 (aged 54); Jeziory, Poland
- Education: Kraków Academy of Fine Arts
- Occupations: Writer, painter, dramatist, philosopher, photographer
- Spouse(s): Jadwiga Unrug, m.1923
- Partner: Jadwiga Janczewska
- Relatives: Father: Stanisław Witkiewicz; Godmother: Helena Modjeska; Father-in-law: Juliusz Kossak
- Writing career
- Pen name: Witkacy
- Notable works: Tumor Mózgowicz; Shoemakers; The Madman and the Nun; Farewell to Autumn; Insatiability

Stanisław Ignacy Witkiewicz (Polish: [staˈɲiswaf iɡˈnatsɨ vʲitˈkʲɛvʲitʂ]; 24 February 1885 – 18 September 1939), commonly known as Witkacy, was a Polish writer, painter, philosopher, theorist, playwright, novelist, and photographer active before World War I and during the interwar period.

== Life ==
Born in Warsaw, Stanisław Ignacy Witkiewicz was a son of the painter, architect and an art critic Stanisław Witkiewicz. His mother was Maria Pietrzkiewicz Witkiewiczowa. Both of his parents were born in the Samogitian region of Lithuania. His godmother was the internationally famous actress Helena Modrzejewska.

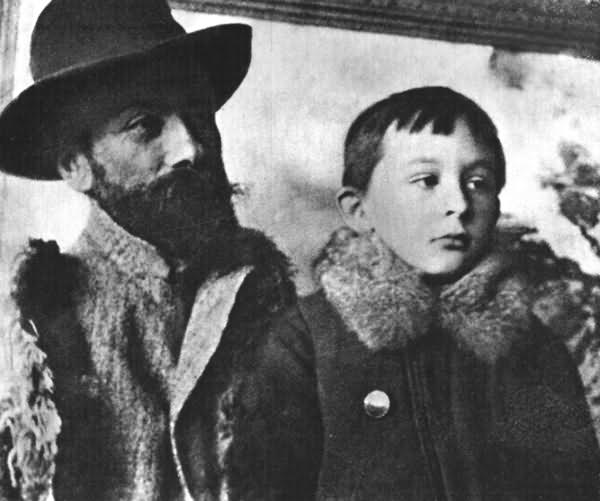
Little Witkacy with his father, ca. 1893

Witkiewicz was reared at the family home in Zakopane. In accordance with his father's antipathy to the "servitude of the school," he was home-schooled and encouraged to develop his talents across a range of creative fields. Against his father's wishes he studied at the Kraków Academy of Fine Arts with Józef Mehoffer and Jan Stanisławski.

Witkiewicz was close friends with composer Karol Szymanowski and, from childhood, with Bronisław Malinowski and Zofia Romer. Romer was romantically linked to both Bronisław Malinowski and Witkiewicz. He had a tumultuous affair with prominent actress Irena Solska who according to Anna Micińska is represented as the heroine Akne Montecalfi in his first novel, The 622 Downfalls of Bungo or The Demonic Woman, 1911. According to Micińska he also represented himself as the character Bungo and Malinowski as the Duke of Nevermore. The unfinished novel, which was not published until 1972, also describes erotic encounters between Bungo and the Duke of Nevermore. Taught wet plate photography by his father, it was during this period that he also began producing the intimate portrait photography for which he is known; producing striking portraits of his circle in Zakopane and many self-portraits.

In 1914 following a crisis in Witkiewicz's personal life due to the suicide of his fiancée Jadwiga Janczewska, for which he blamed himself, he was invited by Malinowski to act as draftsman and photographer on his anthropological expedition to the then Territory of Papua, by way of Ceylon and Australia. The venture was interrupted by the onset of World War I. After quarrelling with Malinowski in Australia, Witkiewicz who was by birth a subject of the Russian Empire, travelled to Saint Petersburg (then Petrograd) from Sydney and was commissioned as an officer in the Pavlovsky Regiment of the Imperial Russian Army. His ailing father, a Polish patriot, was deeply grieved by his son's decision and died in 1915 without seeing him again.

In July 1916 he was seriously wounded in the battle on Stokhid River in what is now Ukraine and was evacuated to St Petersburg where he witnessed the Russian Revolution. He claimed that he worked out his philosophical principles during an artillery barrage, and that when the Revolution broke out he was elected political commissar of his regiment. His later works would show his fear of social revolution and foreign invasion, often couched in absurdist language.

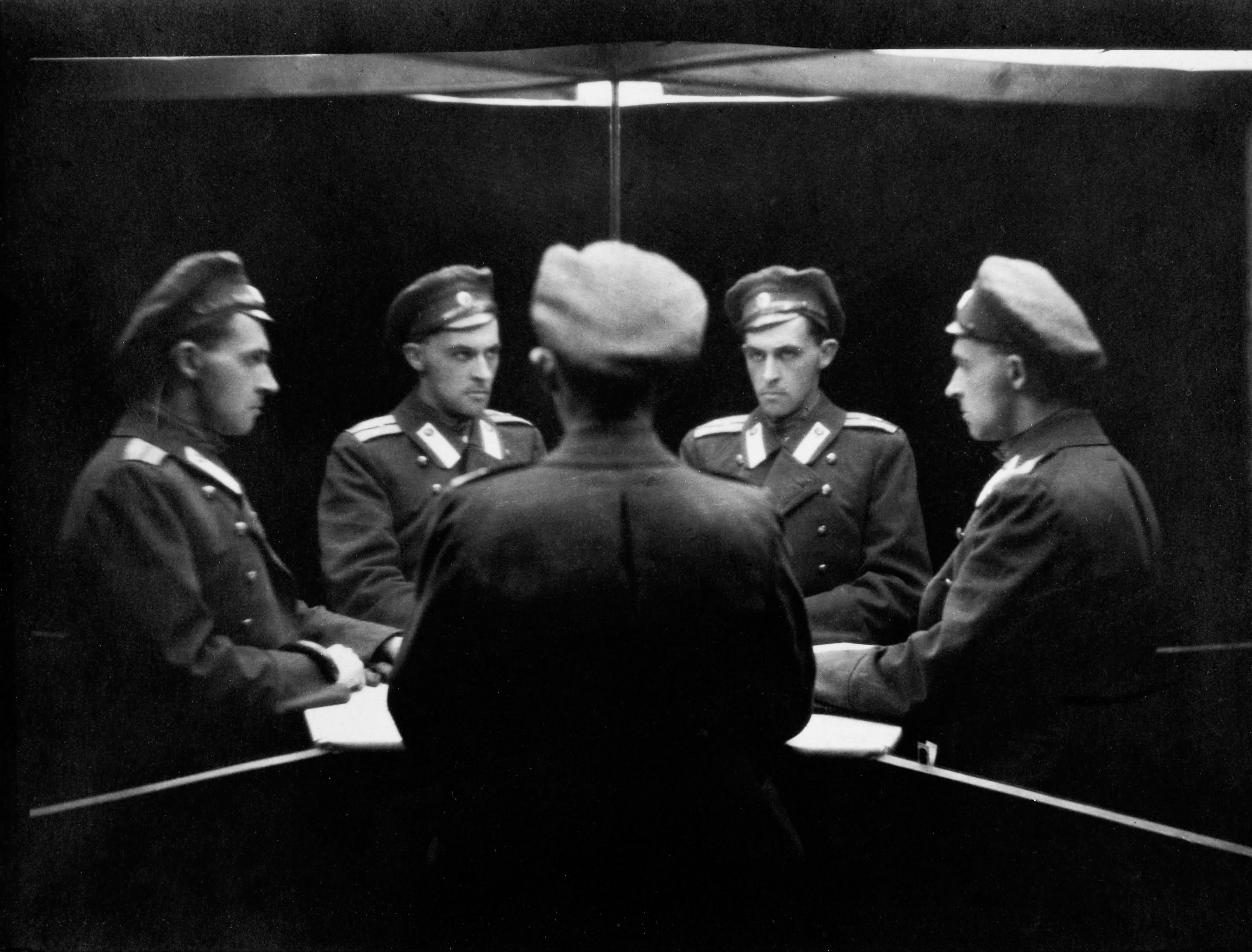
Stanisław Ignacy Witkiewicz, Multiple self-portrait in mirrors, 1915–1917

He had begun to support himself through portrait painting and continued to do so on his return to Zakopane in Poland. He soon entered into a major creative phase, setting out his principles in New Forms in Painting and Introduction to the Theory of Pure Form in the Theatre. He associated with a group of "formist" artists in the early 1920s and wrote most of his plays during this period. Of about forty plays written by Witkiewicz between 1918 and 1925, twenty-one survive, and only Jan Maciej Karol Hellcat met with any public success during the author's lifetime. The original Polish manuscript of The Crazy Locomotive was also lost; the play, back-translated from two French versions, was not published until 1962.

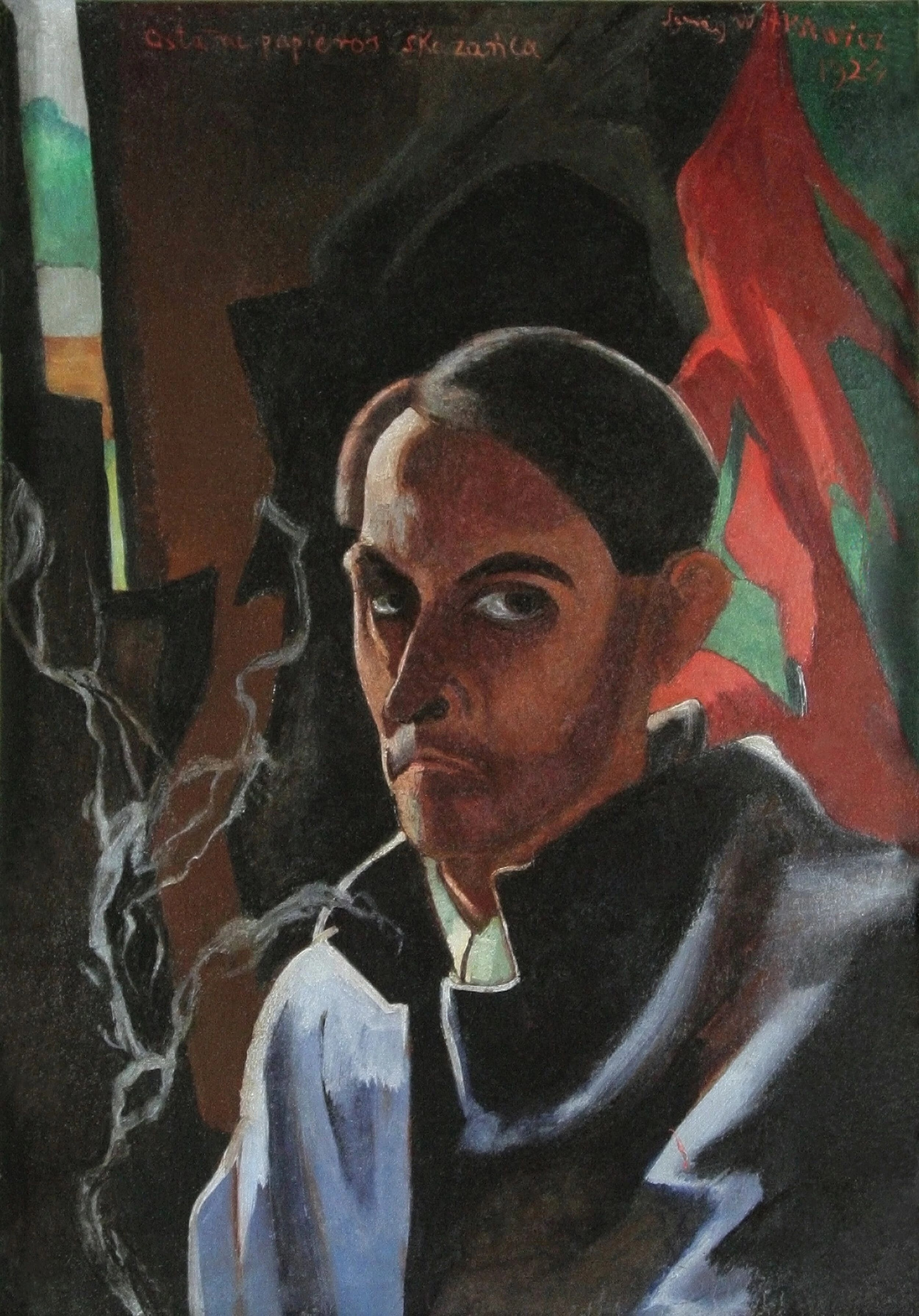
Self-portrait, 1924

After 1925, and taking the name 'Witkacy', the artist ironically re-branded his portrait painting which provided his economic sustenance as The S.I. Witkiewicz Portrait Painting Company, with the tongue in cheek motto: "The customer must always be satisfied". Several of the so-called grades of portraits were offered, from the merely representational to the more expressionistic and the narcotics-assisted. Many of his paintings were annotated with mnemonics listing the drugs taken while painting a particular painting, even if this happened to be only a cup of coffee. He also varied the spelling of his name, signing himself Witkac, Witkatze, Witkacjusz, Vitkacius and Vitecasse — the last being French for "breaks quickly".

In the late 1920s he turned to novel-writing, writing two works, Farewell to Autumn and Insatiability. Both are set in the near future, and as such have been sometimes considered to be part of the fantastika genre. The latter, his major work, encompasses geopolitics, psychoactive drugs, and philosophy. In 1935 he was awarded the Golden Laurel of the Polish Academy of Literature for his novels.

During the 1930s, Witkiewicz published a text on his experiences of narcotics, including peyote, and pursued his interests in philosophy writing, Concepts and Principles Implied by the Concept of Existence 1935. In 1934 he finishes perhaps his most famous literary work, the drama Szewcy, finally published in 1948. He also promoted emerging writers such as Bruno Schulz.

== Death ==
Shortly after Poland was invaded by Germany in September 1939, Witkiewicz escaped with his young lover Czesława Oknińska to the rural frontier town of Jeziory, in what was then eastern Poland. After hearing the news of the Soviet invasion of Poland on 17 September 1939, Witkacy committed suicide on 18 September by taking a drug overdose and trying to slit his wrists. He convinced Czesława to attempt suicide with him by consuming Luminal, but she survived. The film Mystification (2010), written and directed by Jacek Koprowicz proposes, in surrealist fashion, that Witkiewicz faked his own death and lived secretly in Poland until 1968.

== Legacy ==
Witkiewicz had died in some obscurity but his reputation began to rise soon after the war, which had destroyed his life and devastated Poland. Outside of Poland his work was discussed as a precursor to post-WWII European drama in Martin Esslin's influential "Theatre of the Absurd" 1961, and later in Hans-Thies Lehmann's Postdramatisches Theater 1999 (Postdramatic Theatre 2006). Konstanty Puzyna collected his surviving dramatic writings in two volumes in "Dramaty" (Dramas) 1962 which revived interest in his plays in Poland. Through his translations and scholarship, Daniel Gerould introduced English-language audiences to the writings of Witkiewicz.

Czesław Miłosz framed his argument in The Captive Mind around a discussion of Witkiewicz's novel, Insatiability. The artist and theater director Tadeusz Kantor was inspired by the Cricot group, through which Witkiewicz had presented his final plays in Kraków. Kantor brought many of the plays back into currency, first in Poland and then internationally, including The Cuttlefish (1956) and The Water Hen (1969). Visual artist Paulina Olowska produced Witkiewicz's The Mother: An Unsavoury Play in Two Acts and an Epilogue at the Tate Modern in 2015.

Films which have Witkiewicz as the subject include Tumor Witkacego 1985, Mystification 2010 and Witkacy and Malinowski: a cinematic séance in 23 scenes 2018. Films based on his works include Ludiot i kalugericata 1968,Farewell to Autumn 1990, Insatiability 2003,Madame Tutli-Putli 2007 and Nursery Rhyme of a Madman 2017.

Witkiewicz's paintings and pastel drawings are in the collections of the National Museum, Warsaw, the National Museum, Kraków, Museum of Literature, Warsaw and the Museum of Middle Pomerania having 266 works, with 137 exhibited in the White Granary, Słupsk. The Metropolitan Museum of Art and Museum of Modern Art in New York, and the Art Gallery of New South Wales, Sydney hold important examples of his photography. The Villa Oksza Gallery of 20th century art of the Tatra Museum in Zakopane holds important examples of his photography and pastel drawings.

In the postwar period, People's Republic of Poland's Ministry of Culture decided to exhume Witkiewicz's body, move it to Zakopane, and give it a solemn funeral. This was carried out according to plan, though no one was allowed to open the coffin that had been delivered by the Soviet authorities.

On 26 November 1994, the Polish Ministry of Culture and Art ordered the exhumation of the presumed grave of Witkiewicz in Zakopane. Genetic tests on the remaining bones proved that the body had belonged to an unknown woman.

== Works ==
=== Art philosophy ===
- Nowe formy w malarstwie (1919), translated into English as New Forms in Painting and the Misunderstandings Arising Therefrom (in The Witkiewicz Reader, Quartet, 1993)
- Szkice estetyczne (Aesthetic Sketches, 1922)

=== Novels ===
- 622 upadki Bunga, czyli Demoniczna kobieta (1911) partial translation into English as The 622 Downfalls of Bungo or The Demonic Woman (in The Witkiewicz Reader)
- Pożegnanie jesieni (1927) partial translation into English as Farewell to Autumn (in The Witkiewicz Reader)
- Nienasycenie (1930) translated into English as Insatiability (Quartet Encounter, 1985)
- Jedyne wyjście ("The Only Way Out") unfinished

=== Plays ===
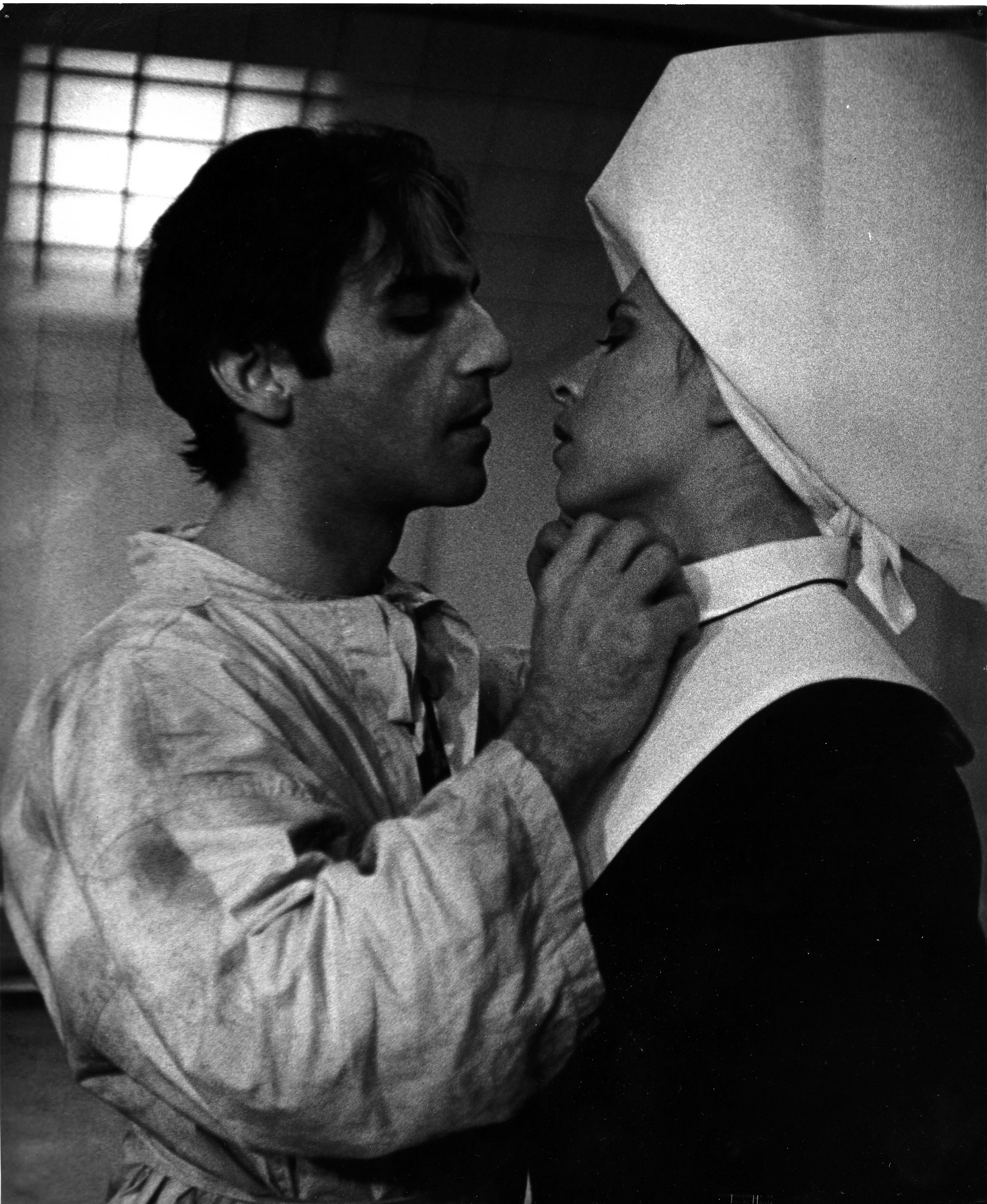
Bob DeFrank and Ann Crumb in a scene from Paul Berman's production of Witkacy's The Madman and the Nun, Theatre Off Park, 1979

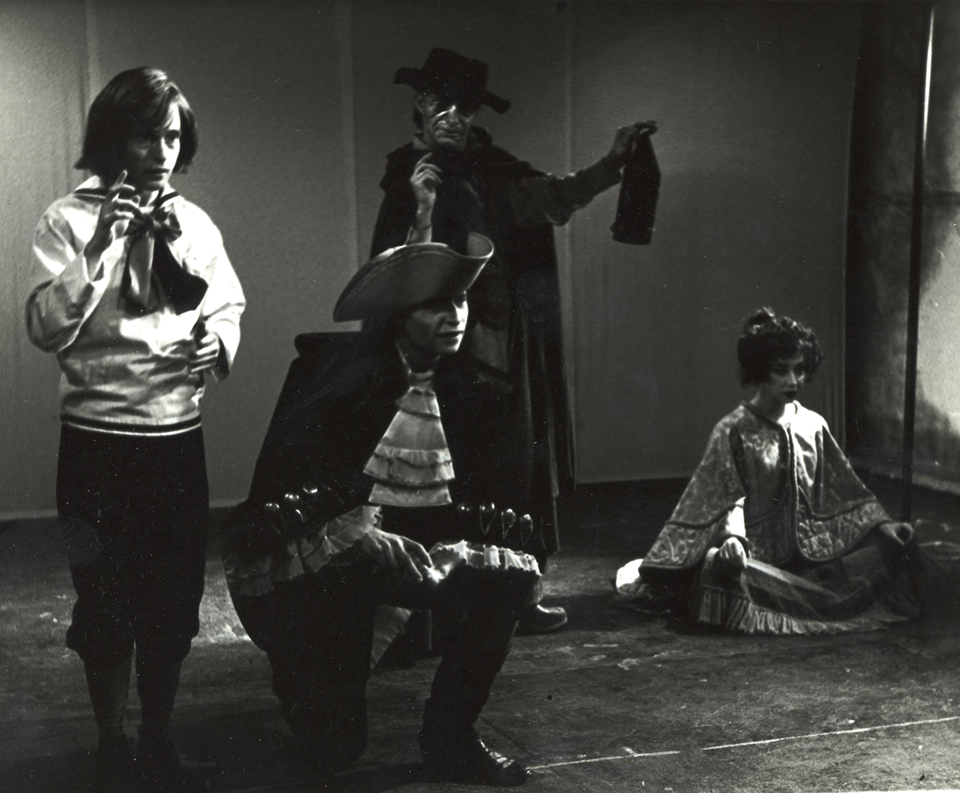
Tobias Haller, James Curran, Nat Warren-White, and Betty LaRoe in Brad Mays' production of Witkacy's The Water Hen, Theatre Off Park, 1983

- Maciej Korbowa i Bellatrix (Maciej Korbowa and Bellatrix) (1918)
- Pragmatyści (1919) (translated into English as The Pragmatists)
- Mister Price, czyli Bzik tropikalny (1920) (translated into English as Mr Price, or Tropical Madness)
- Tumor Mózgowicz (1920) (translated into English as Tumor Brainiowicz)
- Nowe wyzwolenie (1920) (translated into English as The New Deliverance)
- Oni (1920) (translated into English as They)
- Panna Tutli-Putli (1920) (Miss Tootli-Pootli)
- W małym dworku (1921) (translated into English as Country House)
- Niepodległość trójkątów (1921) (translated into English as The Independence of Triangles)
- Metafizyka dwugłowego cielęcia (1921) (translated into English as Metaphysics of a Two-Headed Calf)
- Gyubal Wahazar, czyli Na przełęczach bezsensu (translated into English as Gyubal Wahazar, or Along the Cliffs of the Absurd: A Non-Euclidean Drama in Four Acts) (1921)
- Kurka Wodna (1921) (Translated into English as The Water Hen)
- Bezimienne dzieło (1921) (translated into English as The Anonymous Work: Four Acts of a Rather Nasty Nightmare)
- Mątwa (1922) (translated into English as The Cuttlefish, or The Hyrcanian World View)
- Nadobnisie i koczkodany, czyli Zielona pigułka (1922) (Translated into English as Dainty Shapes and Hairy Apes, or The Green Pill: A Comedy with Corpses)
- Jan Maciej Karol Wścieklica (1922) (translated into English as Jan Maciej Karol Hellcat)
- Wariat i zakonnica (1923) (translated into English as The Madman and the Nun)
- Szalona lokomotywa (1923) (translated into English as The Crazy Locomotive)
- Janulka, córka Fizdejki (1923) (translated into English as Janulka, Daughter of Fizdejko)
- Matka (1924) translated into English as The Mother (in The Mother & Other Unsavoury Plays, Applause, 1993)
- Sonata Belzebuba (1925) (translated into English as The Beelzebub Sonata)
- Szewcy (1931–34) translated into English as The Shoemakers (in The Mother & Other Unsavoury Plays, Applause, 1993)

=== Filmography ===
- Witkacy z Niną w Warszawie (1927), comedy film by Stanisław Ignacy Witkiewicz. Starring him and his wife Jadwiga in the city of Warsaw. Film housed in the Adam Mickiewicz Museum of Literature in Warsaw. Details: black and white film reel Pathé 9.5 mm, 5 minutes, silent film; remastered in 4K quality in 2015.

=== Other works ===
- Narkotyki — niemyte dusze (1932), partial translation into English as Narcotics (in The Witkiewicz Reader)
- Pojęcia i twierdzenia implikowane przez pojęcie istnienia (Concepts and Statements Implied by the Idea of Existence) (1935)
- Jedyne wyjście
- Kompozycia fantastyczna
- Pocałunek mongolskiego księcia

== Sample artwork ==
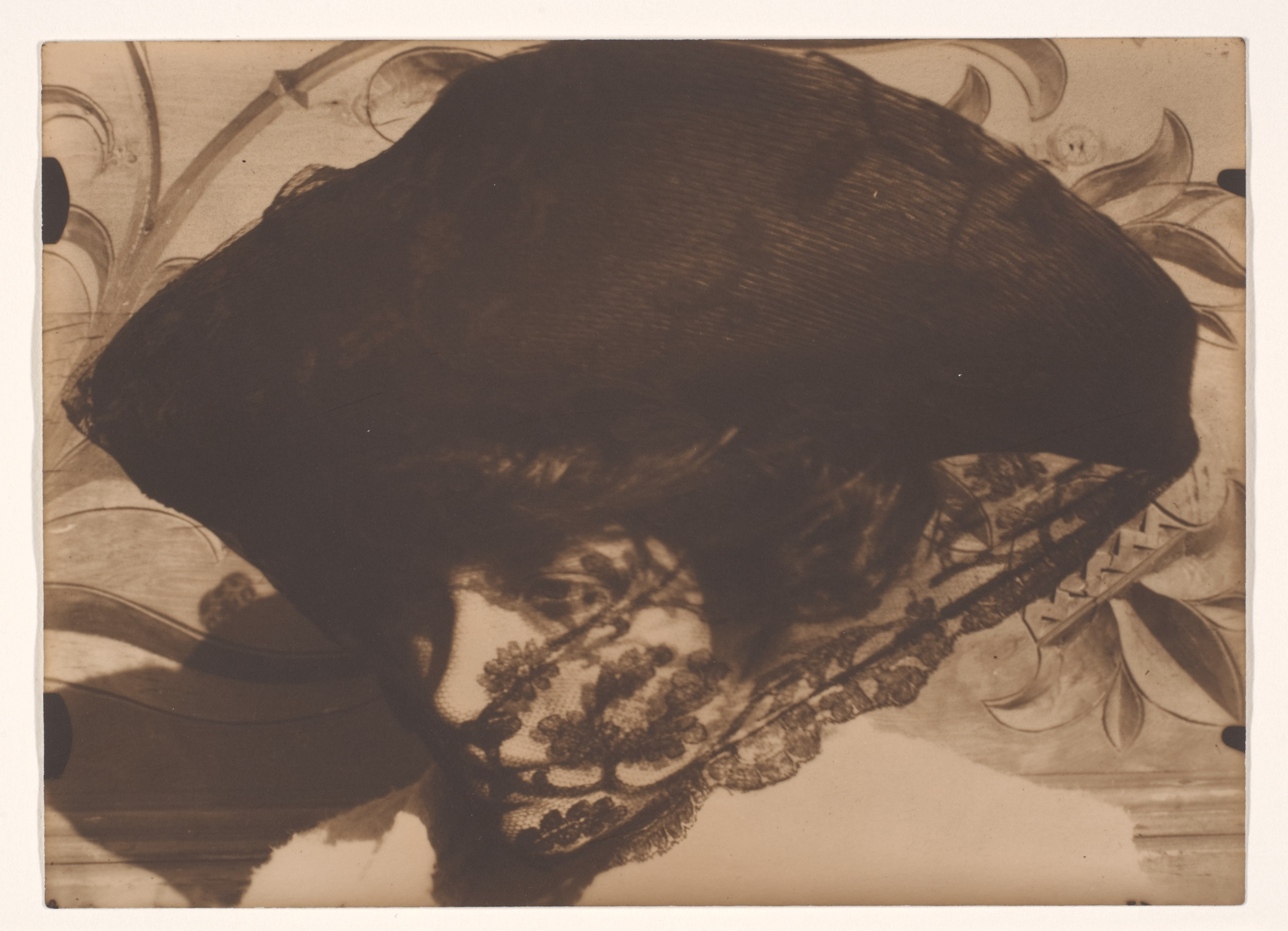
Jadwiga Janczewska, Zakopane
1913

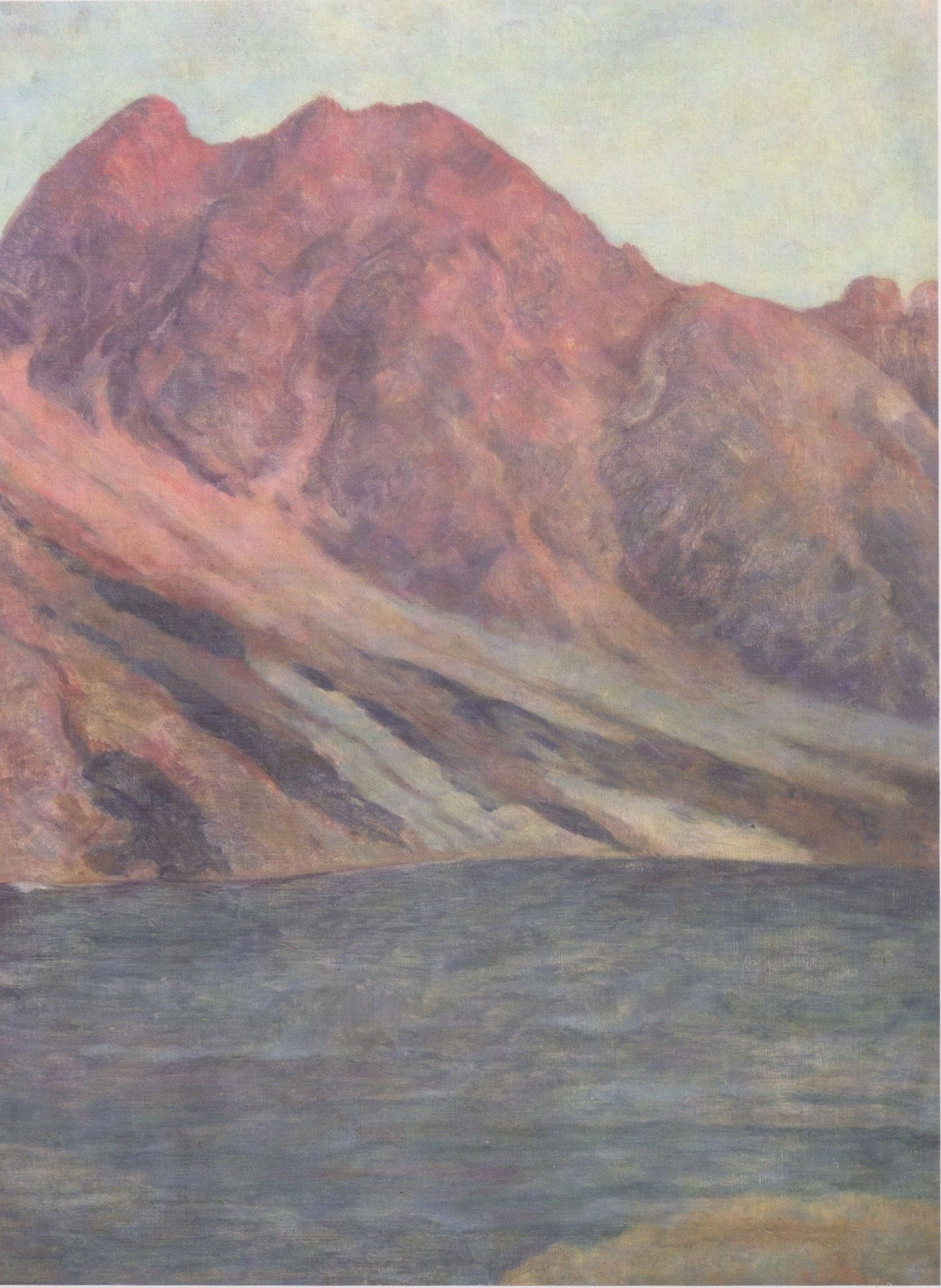
Black Lake
1907, Tatra Museum in Zakopane

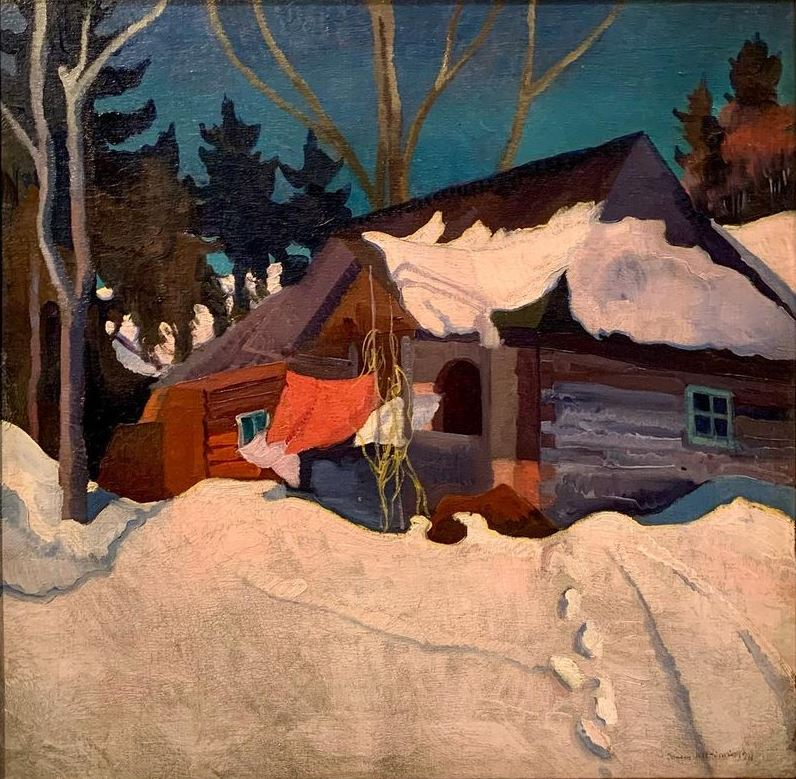
Winter Landscape at Zakopane
after 1930, Museum of Fine Arts, Szépművészeti, Budapest

Bronisława Wieniawa-Długoszowska
1918

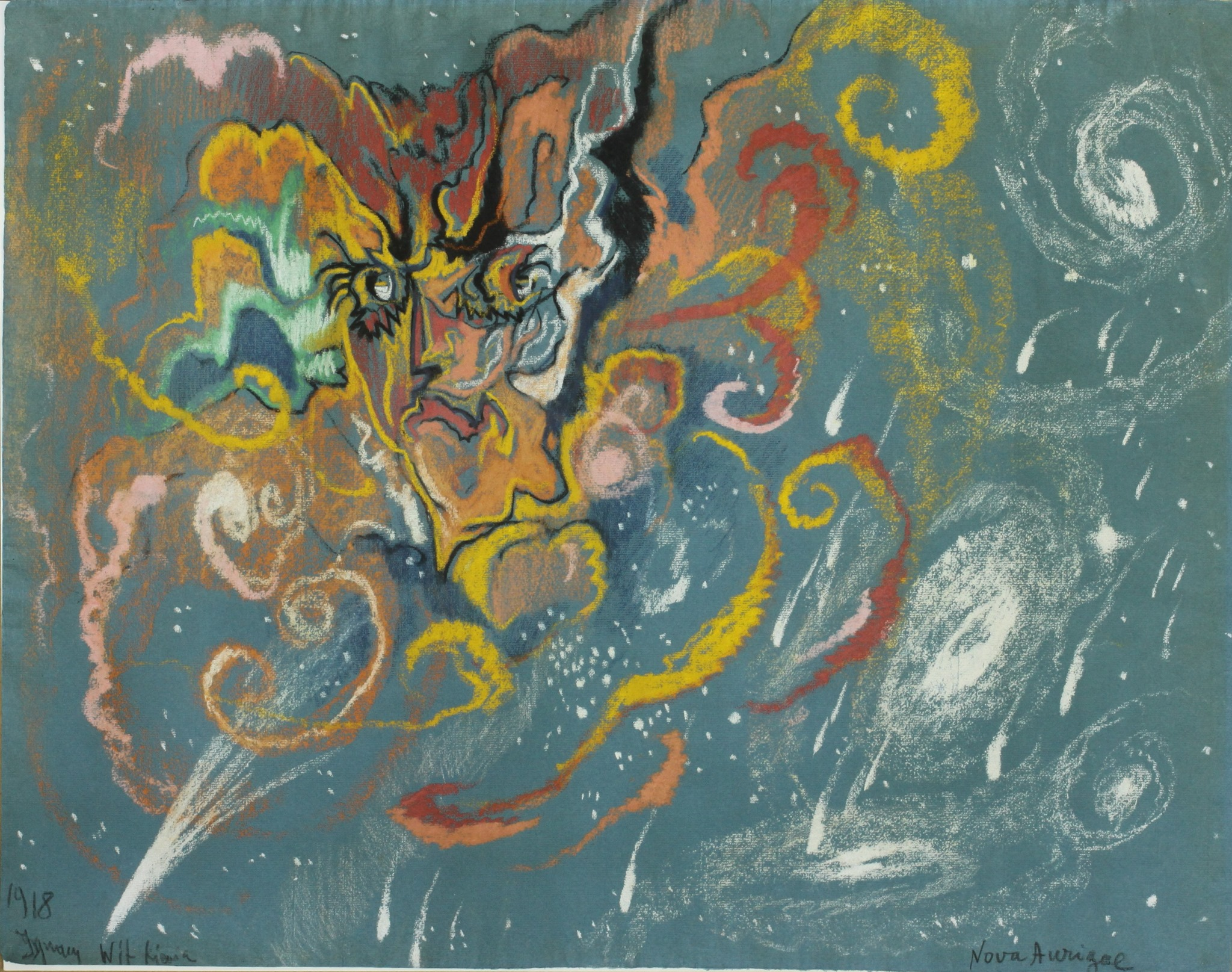
Nova Aurigae
1918, Adam Mickiewicz Museum of Literature, Warsaw

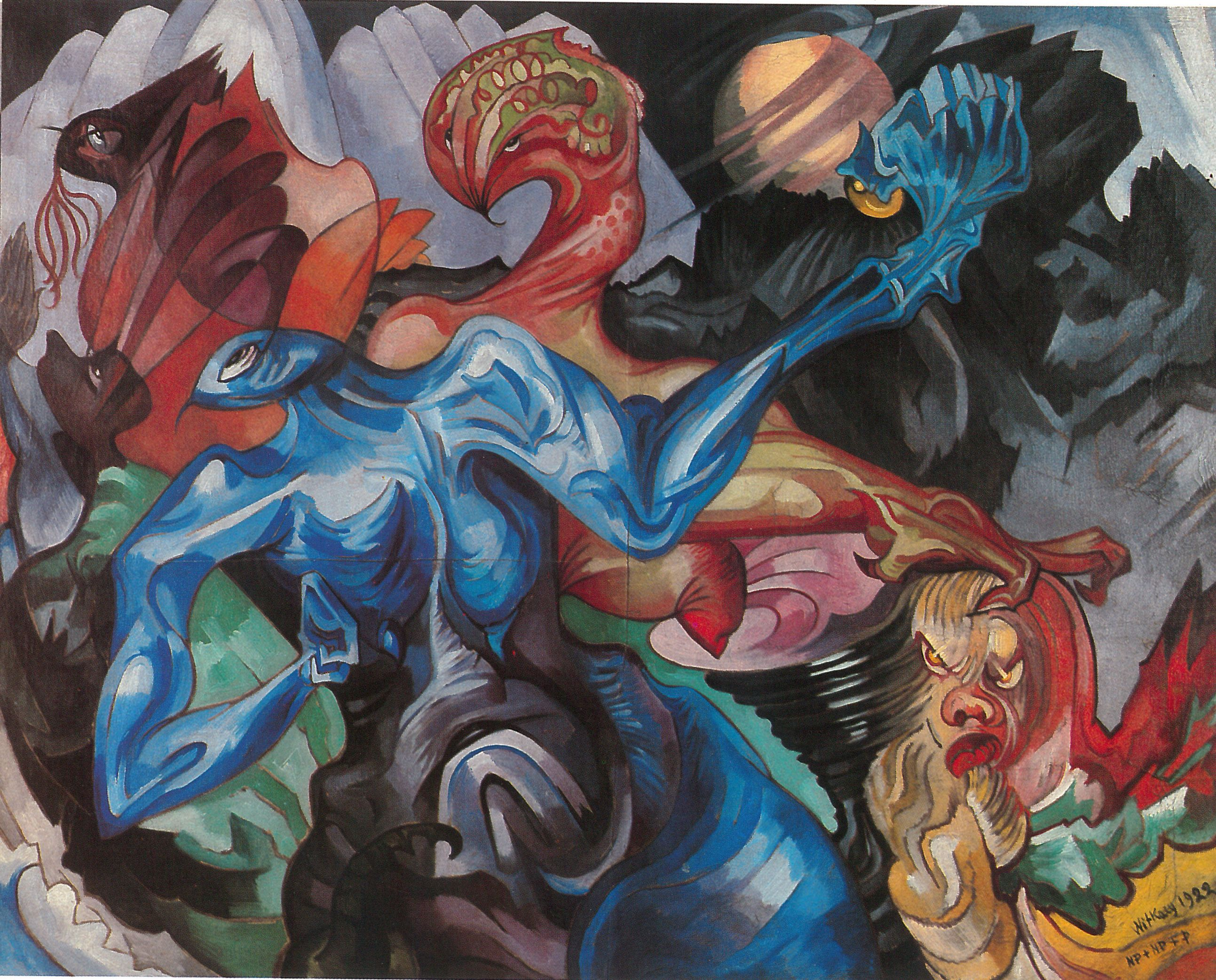
Composition
1922, National Museum, Kraków

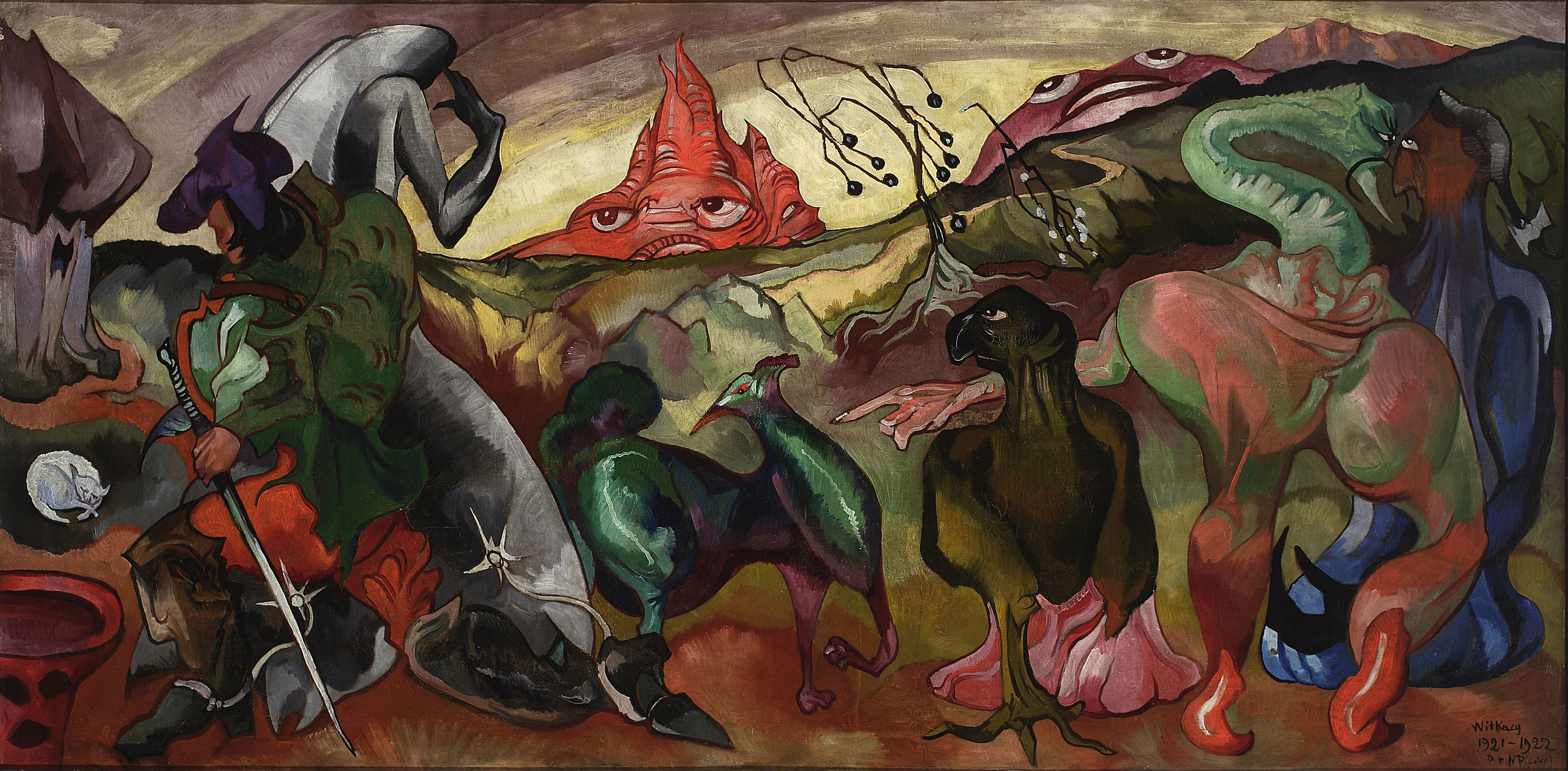
Fantasy – Fairy-tale
1922, National Museum, Warsaw

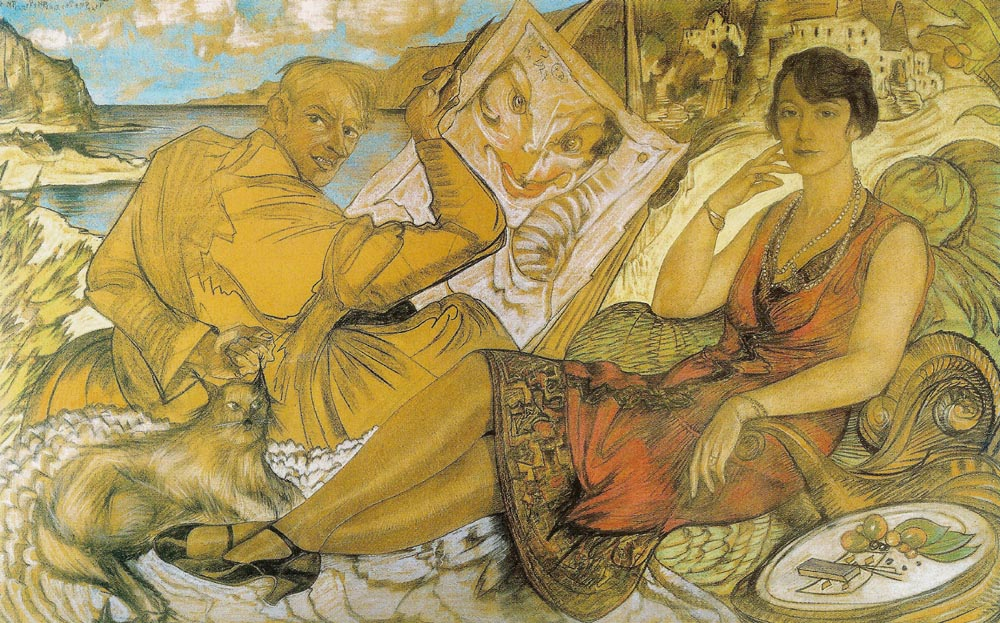
Self-portrait with Mrs. Maryla Grosmanowa
1927, National Museum, Warsaw

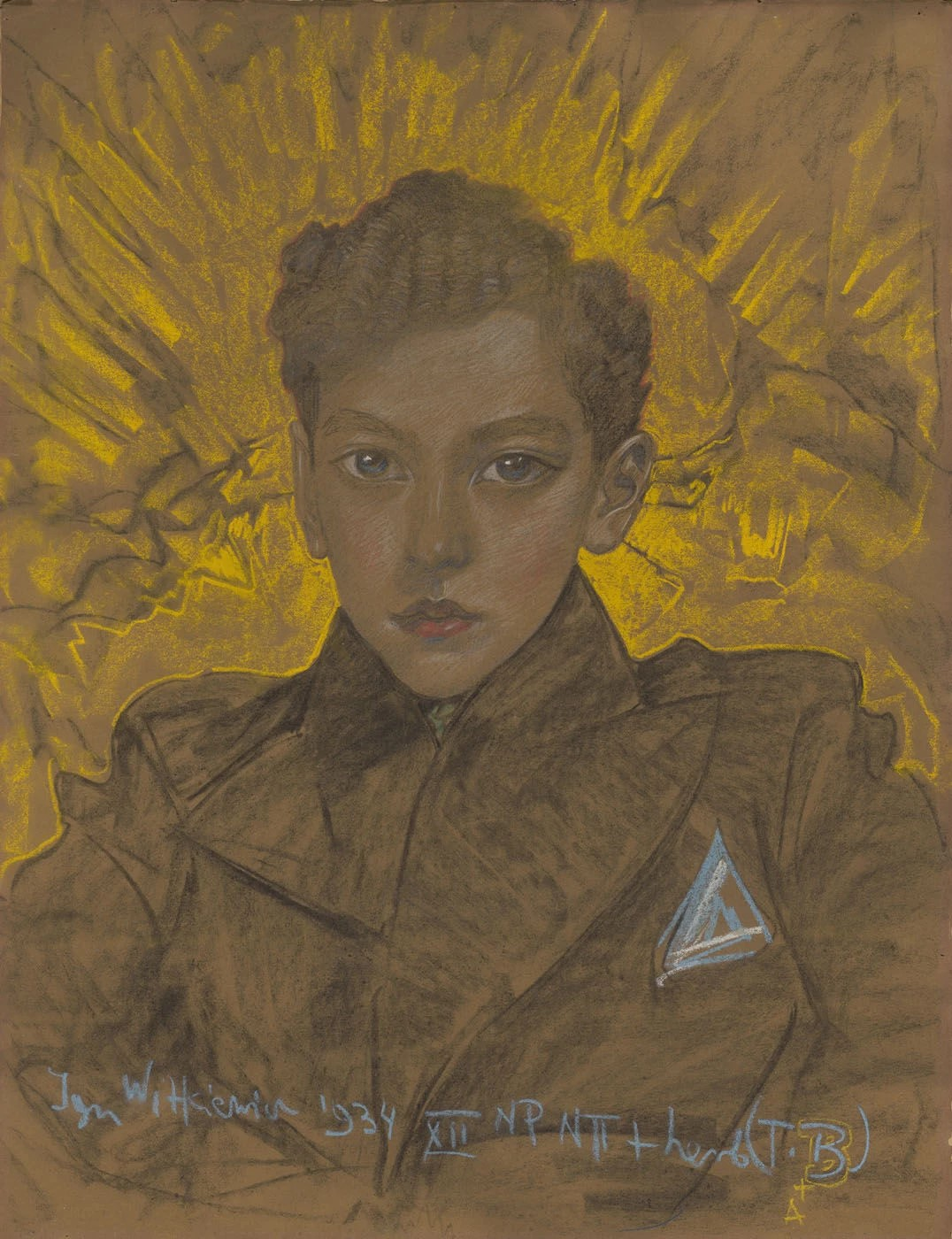
Portrait of a boy
1934, Silesian Museum (Katowice)

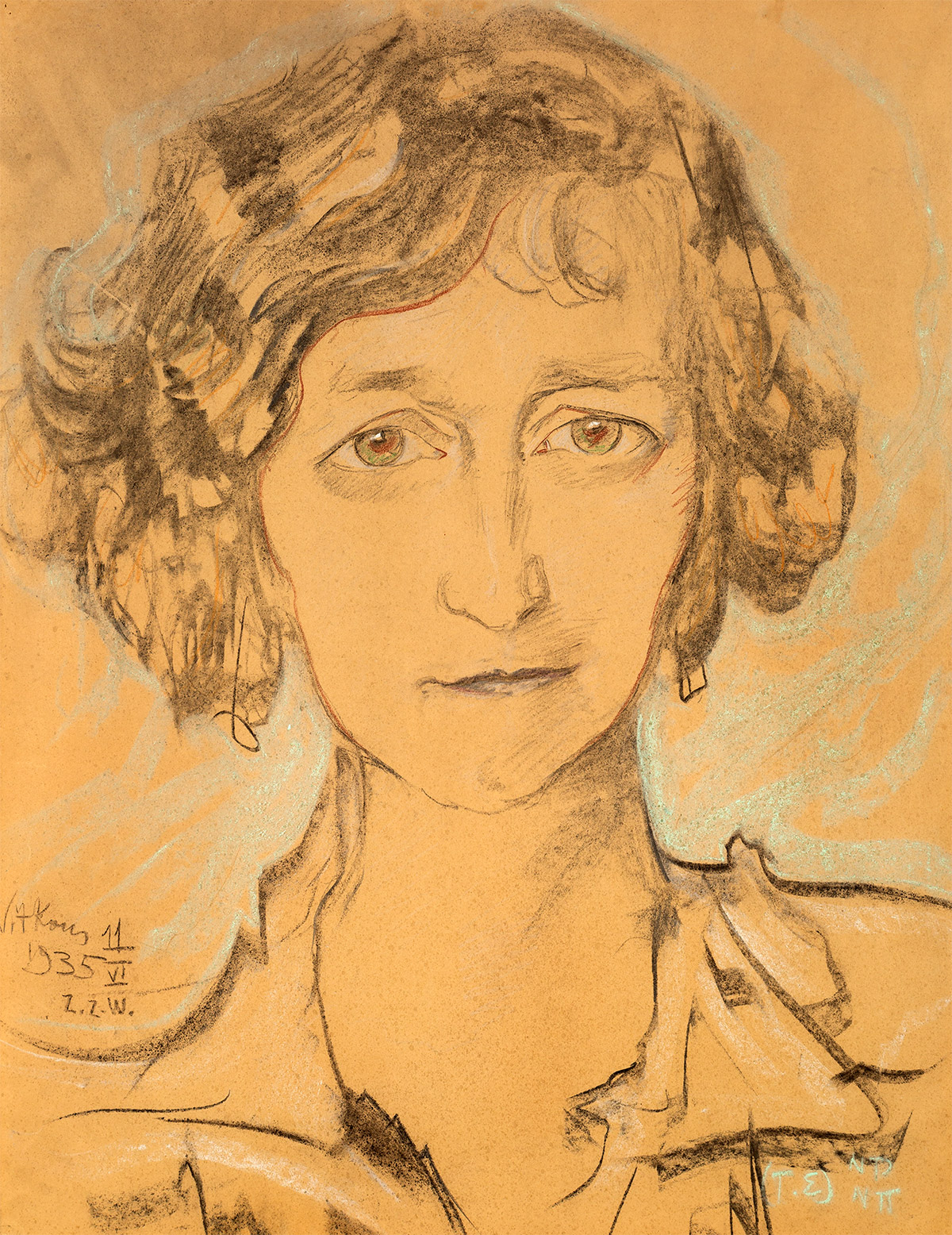
Zofia Romer
1935

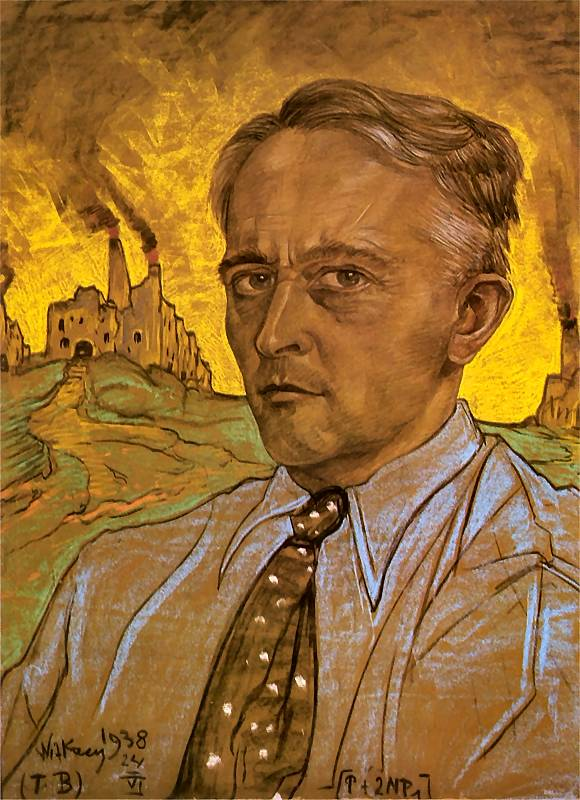
Self-portrait
1938, Silesian Museum (Katowice)

== Performances of work ==
- The Crazy Locomotive (Szalona lokomotywa) received its New York premier at the Chelsea Theatre in 1977, under the direction of Des McAnuff. The Obie Award-winning production starred Dwight Schultz, Bob DeFrank and Glenn Close in leading roles.

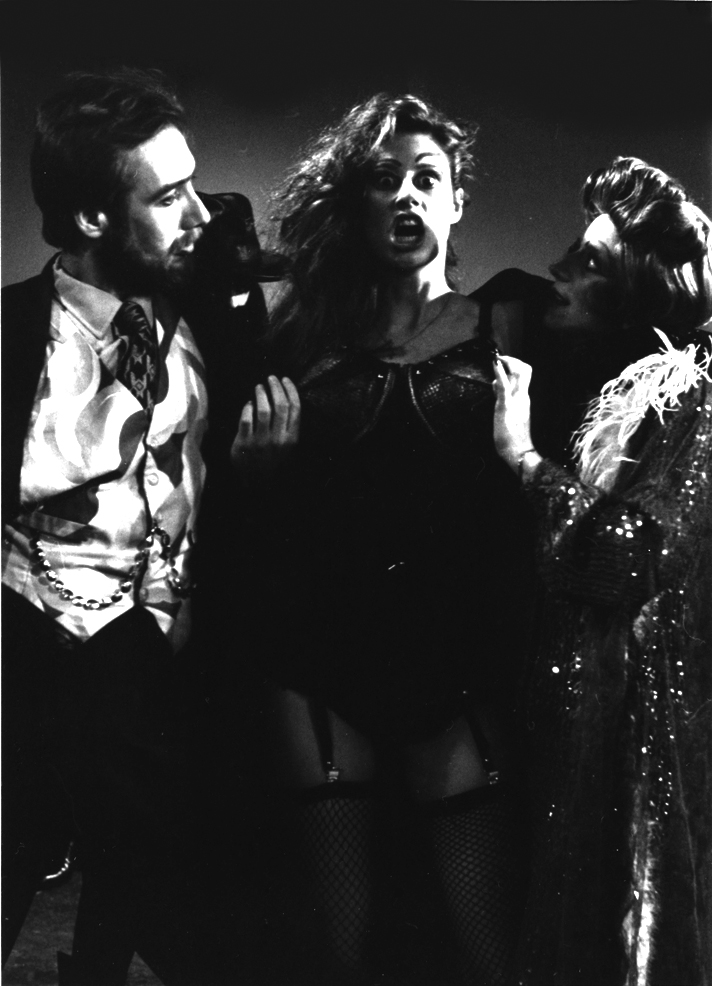
James Fleming, Lee Taylor-Allan and Linda Chambers in Brad Mays' production of Witkacy's The Water Hen, Theatre Off Park, 1983

- Two New York premiers of Witkacy plays: The Madman and the Nun (Wariat i zakonnica) in 1979 under the direction of Paul Berman and The Water Hen (Kurka Wodna) directed by Brad Mays were staged by the Theatre Off-Park, in 1983. Broadway producer / Theatre Off-Park managing director Patricia Flynn Peate produced both plays, which were well received by critics and audiences alike. Future New York Times theatre critic Mark Matousek, then writing for the theatrical journal Other Stages, praised The Water Hen for "masterful comic direction," and the piece was videotaped for permanent inclusion in the Lincoln Center's Billy Rose Theatre Collection.
- The British premiere of "They" "(Oni)" was presented at the Polish Theatre Hammersmith, London by POSK, directed by Paul Brightwell in 1984
- The New York premiere of The Shoemakers (Szewcy) was presented by the Jean Cocteau Repertory under the direction of Włodzimierz Herman in 1987.
- The Madman and the Nun was presented in 1989 by The Cosmic Bicycle Theatre at the Summer Music from Greensborough, a Classical Music Festival in Greensborough, Vermont, and in Boston, at The Charlestown Working Theatre. Directed by Jonathan Edward Cross [a.k.a. Jonny ClockWorks]. The production used Actors alongside Life-sized Puppets. Two of the original Puppet Figures are in the collection of the Witkacy Teatre in Zarkopane' Poland.
- The New York premiere of Witkacy's Tumor Brainiowicz presented by La MaMa ETC was performed by The Theatre of a Two-Headed Calf (named after the Witkacy play Metaphysics of a Two-Headed Calf), under the direction of Brooke O'Harra. This production was followed by Witkacy's The Mother in 2003, also under O'Harra's direction and also a New York premier. The production featured puppets and video.
- In 2019 Witkacy/Two-Headed Calf, a collaboration between CalArts Center for New Performance and STUDIO teatrgaleria, Warsaw, was directed by Natalia Korczakowska

== See also ==
- History of philosophy in Poland
- Culture of Kraków
- List of Poles
- Mononymous persons
