= Tadeusz Katelbach =

Polish journalist (1897–1977)

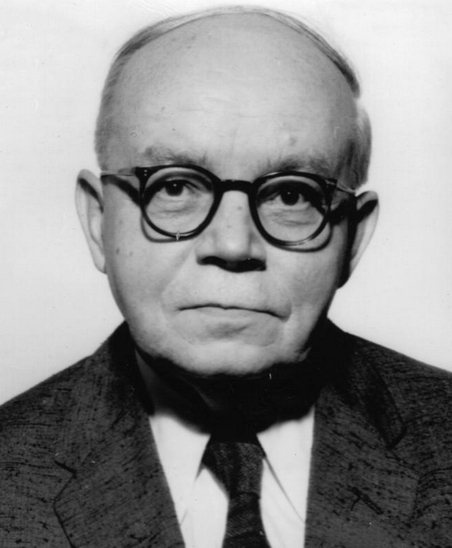
Tadeusz Katelbach

Tadeusz Katelbach (1897–1977) was a Polish politician, diplomat, journalist, publicist, senator in the Second Polish Republic, and activist of American Polonia.

== Early years ==
Born on February 24, 1897, in Warsaw, which at that time belonged to Russian-controlled Congress Poland, Katelbach attended Gorski High School in Warsaw. In 1910, he joined secret Polish organization Association of Progressive Independent Youth (Zwiazek Mlodziezy Postepowo-Niepodleglosciowej), and in 1913, he entered the paramilitary Riflemen's Association. In August 1914, after the outbreak of World War I, Katelbach joined Polish Military Organisation.

In November 1915, after German Army had captured Warsaw (see Great Retreat (Russian)), Katelbach began studying law at Warsaw University. While still a member of Polish Military Organisation, he also joined Association of the Polish Youth "Zet", and was one of leaders of a student strike in 1917.

In late 1918 and early 1919, Katelbach fought in the Polish–Ukrainian War in Lwów. In August 1919, together with other activists of Polish Military Organisation, he organized the Sejny Uprising, aimed at local Lithuanian administration. During this rebellion, Katelbach became a close associate of Second Directorate of Polish General Staff (see History of Polish intelligence services), which was responsible for military intelligence and counterintelligence. As a member of Association of Kresy Guards, he came to Wilno after Żeligowski's Mutiny, and became editor in chief of the Gazeta Wilenska newspaper.

== Second Polish Republic ==
In 1922, Katelbach was sent on a short mission to the Free City of Danzig, and in January 1923, shortly after his wedding with Zenaida née Semplinska, he left for Berlin. Officially, Katelbach was a reporter of several Polish papers, but the real purpose of his mission was to provide a link between the government in Warsaw, and newly created Union of Poles in Germany. After a few months, Katelbach returned to Warsaw and work in a bank for over a year.

In November 1925, he was sent to Geneva. Again, Katelbach was presented as a journalist, but in fact he was a resident spy. In May 1926, shortly before the May Coup (Poland), he was recalled to Poland, and joined pro-Sanacja organization Union for Improvement of the Republic. In January 1927, Katelbach was again sent to Berlin, tasked with centralization of Polish national organizations in Weimar Republic. He remained there until August 2, 1933, when he was sent to Kaunas, where Katelbach was regarded as unofficial Polish envoy to Lithuania. In 1937, after returning to Poland, he was awarded Officer's Cross of the Order of Polonia Restituta.

In 1937 - 38, Katelbach together with his brother Stefan became actively involved in Polish filming industry. He managed film department at Polish Telegraphic Agency. In November 1938, after joining pro-government Camp of National Unity, he was elected to the Polish Senate from the District of Lublin.

== World War Two ==
On September 12, 1939, Minister of Propaganda Michał Grażyński ordered Katelbach to form information and press office of his ministry at Budapest. Two days later, at a local office building in Zaleszczyki, Katelbach met with oppositional, anti-Sanacja politicians: Stanisław Stroński, Henryk Strasburger, Aleksander Ładoś, August Zaleski and Tadeusz Tomaszewski. A few months later, all became involved in Władysław Sikorski's Government in Exile, located in France.

Katelbach left Poland on September 14, and while in Romania, he immediately became involved in the activities of a political group associated with Ambassador Roger Raczyński, Alfred Poninski and Polish military attache to Romania, Colonel Tadeusz Zakrzewski. It was partly due to their activities that members of legal Polish government, together with Prime Minister Felicjan Sławoj Składkowski were interned by the Romanians in the town of Slanic. On September 21, Katelbach sent a letter to Skladkowski, urging him to resign from the post, and on the next day he left Romania, to reach Paris on October 6, 1939.

Enjoying the support of Stanisław Stroński, who was deputy Prime Minister of Władysław Sikorski's government-in-exile, Katelbach was offered a job at the Ministry of Information and Documentation. After the Fall of France, on June 23, 1940, he left for Portugal, via Spain, and joined the Committee of Aid for Polish Refugees in Lisbon. On July 14, 1940, he came to London, and was immediately named chairman of German Department at the Office of Documentation (part of Stanislaw Stronski Ministry of Information). Katelbach remained in this post since July 1941 until July 1945, when Great Britain ceased to recognize Polish government in Exile.

== Postwar period and death ==
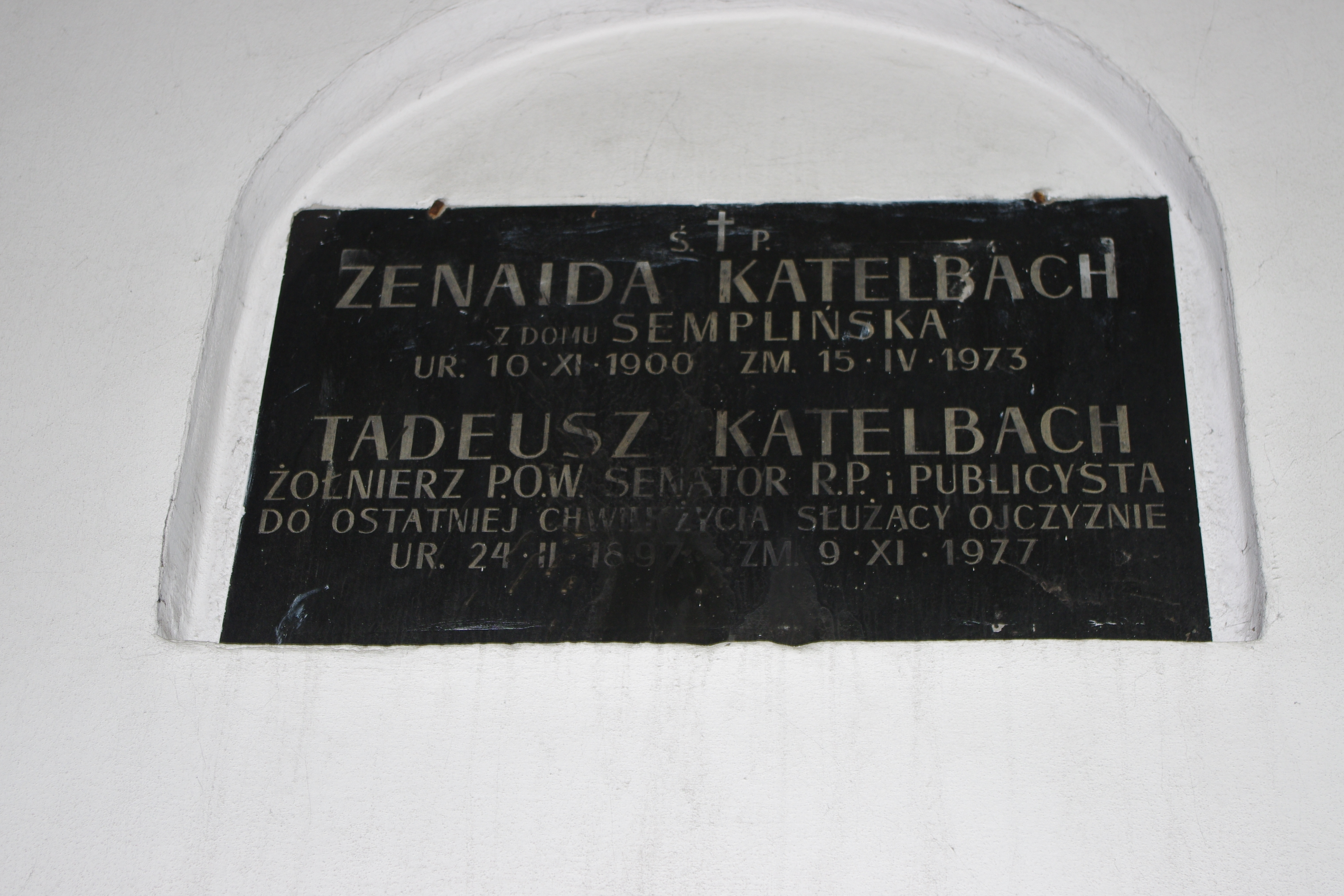
Grave of Tadeusz Katelbach in catacombs section of the Powązki Cemetery, Warsaw

After the war, Katelbach decided to stay in London, where he lived until 1955, as an active member of Polish emigree circles. In June 1955 he left for Munich, where Jan Nowak-Jeziorański offered him a job at Polish Section of Radio Free Europe. Recommended by Kazimierz Sosnkowski and Tadeusz Bielecki, Katelbach remained a full-time employee of the radio until his retirement in July 1965.

In December 1965, together with wife, Katelbach left Munich and went to Seattle, where their daughter Nina Polan lived. In May 1966, they moved to New York City.

Suffering from diabetes, Tadeusz Katelbach died from myocardial infarction on November 9, 1977, in New York City, while awaiting heart surgery. He was buried alongside his wife, Zenaida, and their daughter, in catacombs section of the Powązki Cemetery in Warsaw.

== The Year of Bad Prophecies ==
Tadeusz Katelbach wrote several books, including his 1943 London diary "The Year of Bad Prophecies" ("Rok zlych wrozb"). In the book, he presents a vivid portrait of members of Polish Government in Exile, and criticizes Prime Minister Władysław Sikorski for his decisions. Katelbach writes: "The year 1943 brought us bad events. Political leadership of the Polish Government in London was unable to cope with the difficult tasks. The westward march of the Soviet armies, flooding Polish lands, was a forecast of complete subjugation of Poland. The stance of Moscow leaves no illusions (...) After the disastrous Sikorski–Mayski agreement of 1941, Sikorski caused the dissolution of the National Council of Poland, so that there is no discussion of the agreement (...) The Allies are making it obvious that they are leaving us alone with Moscow. And Moscow has already decided the question of our Eastern borders. The realists know it, even though Stalin for propaganda reasons assures that Russia does not plan to seize non-Russian lands (...) The Soviets spend 200 000 pounds monthly for their propaganda, which is visible everywhere in England. At a movie theatre, during a Soviet film about Stalingrad, a Semitic-looking young man in front of me was hysterically clapping his hands upon seeing the Soviet dictator."

== Sources ==
- Sławomir Cenckiewicz Tadeusz Katelbach. Biografia polityczna (1897-1977), Warszawa 2005, Wyd. Towarzystwo Przyjaciół Instytutów Józefa Piłsudskiego Zagranicą, Wydawnictwo LTW.
